= 1966–67 South-West Indian Ocean cyclone season =

Cyclone season in the Southwest Indian Ocean

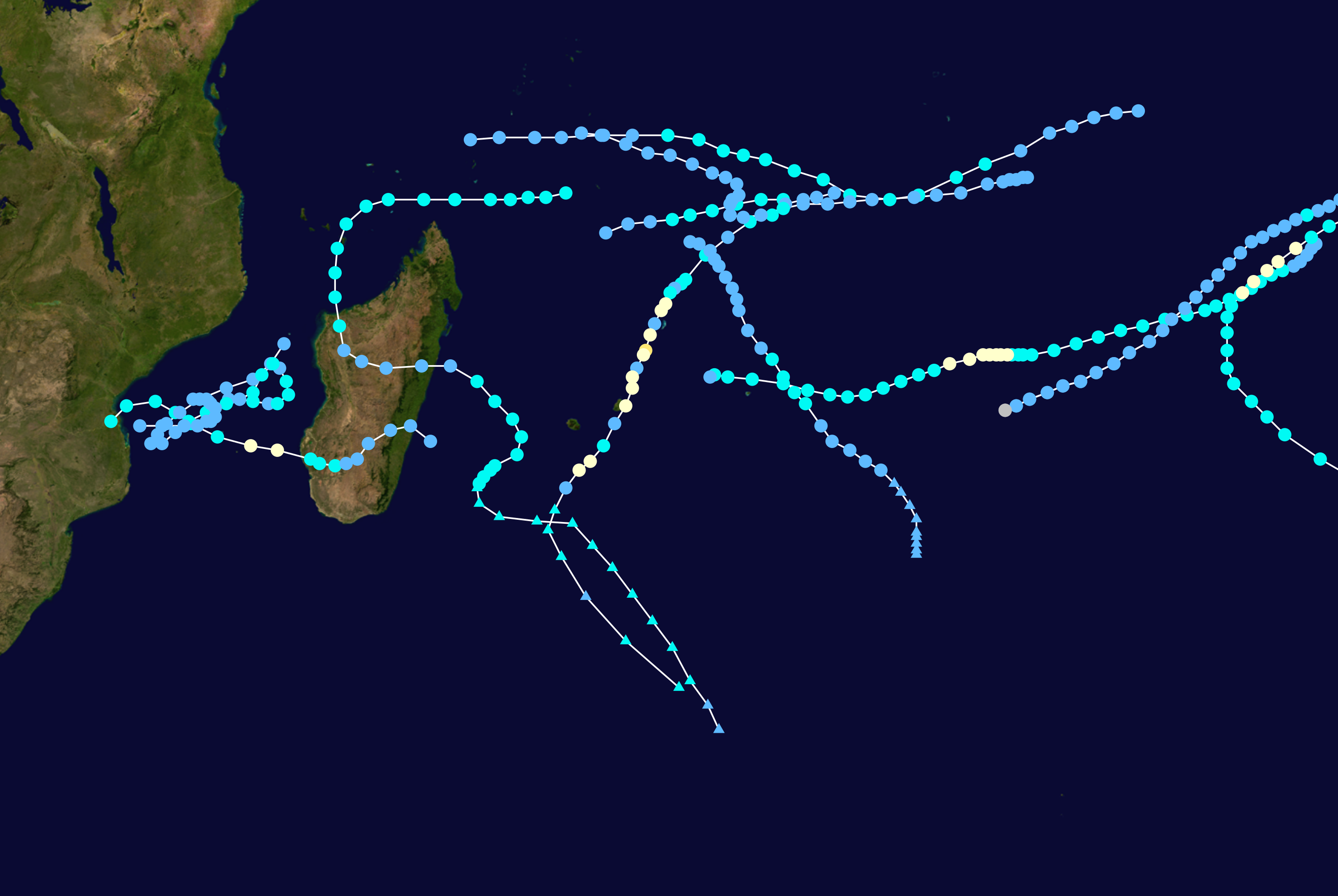
- Season summary map

Seasonal boundaries
- First system formed: September 29, 1966
- Last system dissipated: May 21, 1967

Strongest storm
- Name: Gilberte
  - Maximum winds: 130 km/h (80 mph) (1-minute sustained)
  - Lowest pressure: 970 hPa (mbar)

Seasonal statistics
- Total depressions: 11
- Total storms: 8
- Total fatalities: Unknown
- Total damage: Unknown

Related articles
- 1966–67 Australian region cyclone season; 1966–67 South Pacific cyclone season

The 1966–67 South-West Indian Ocean cyclone season was an average cyclone season.

== Systems ==
=== Moderate Tropical Storm Angela ===
- Moderate tropical storm (MFR)
- Tropical storm (SSHWS)
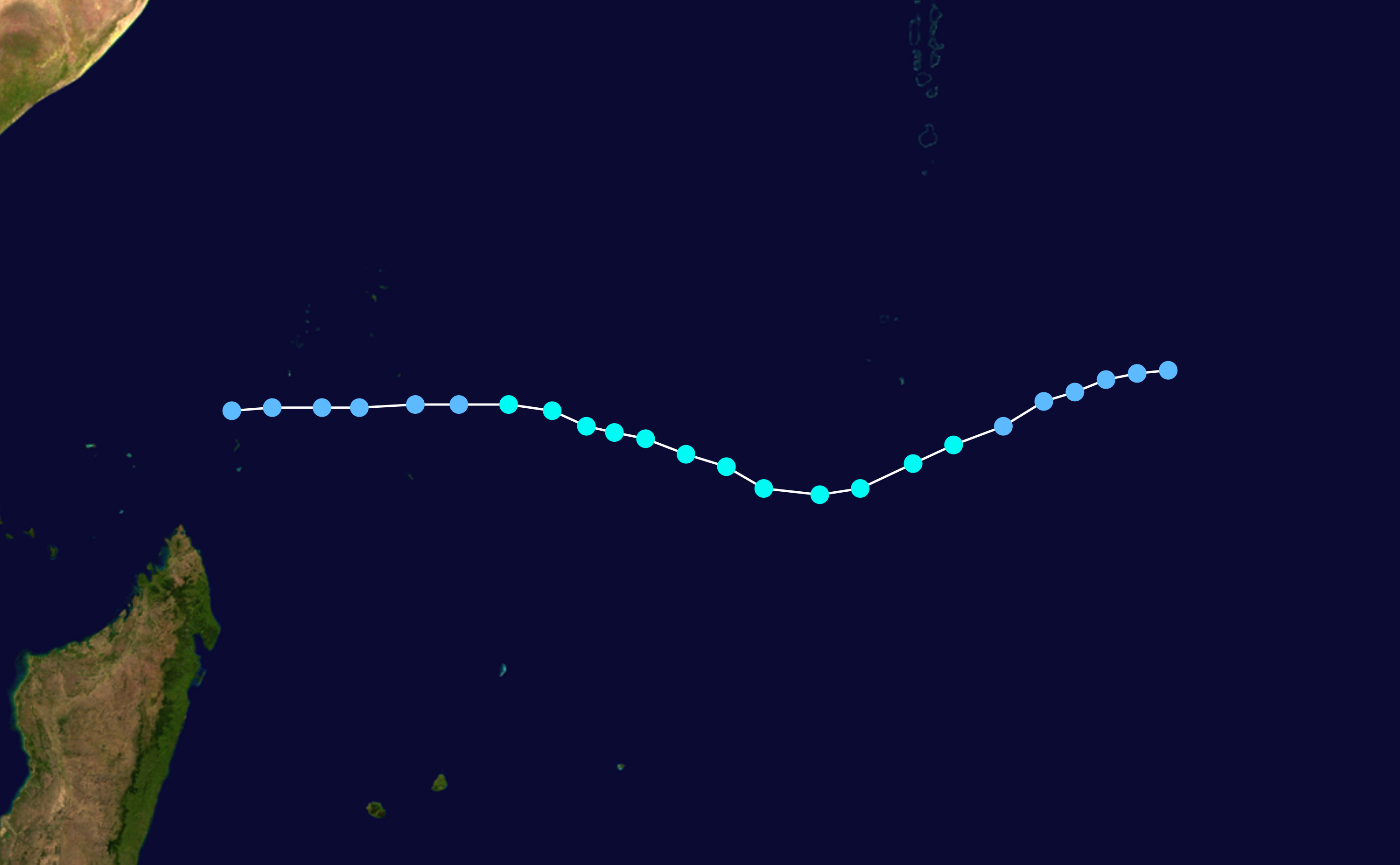
- Duration: September 29 – October 5
- Peak intensity: 65 km/h (40 mph) (10-min);

Angela existed from September 29 to October 5.

=== Moderate Tropical Storm Bella ===
- Moderate tropical storm (MFR)
- Tropical storm (SSHWS)
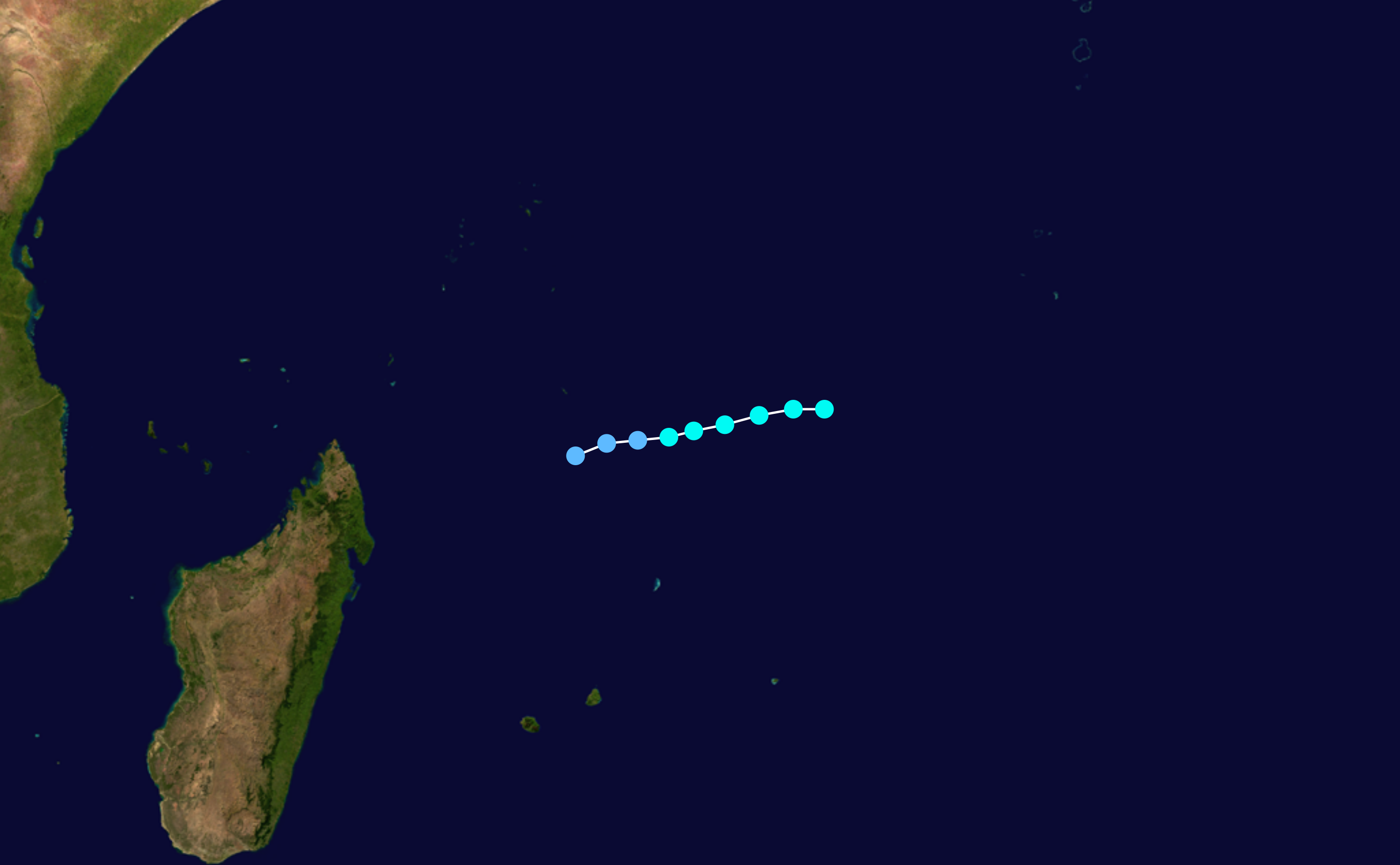
- Duration: December 3 – December 5
- Peak intensity: 65 km/h (40 mph) (10-min);

Bella existed from December 3 to December 5.

=== Severe Tropical Storm Colette ===
- Severe tropical storm (MFR)
- Tropical storm (SSHWS)
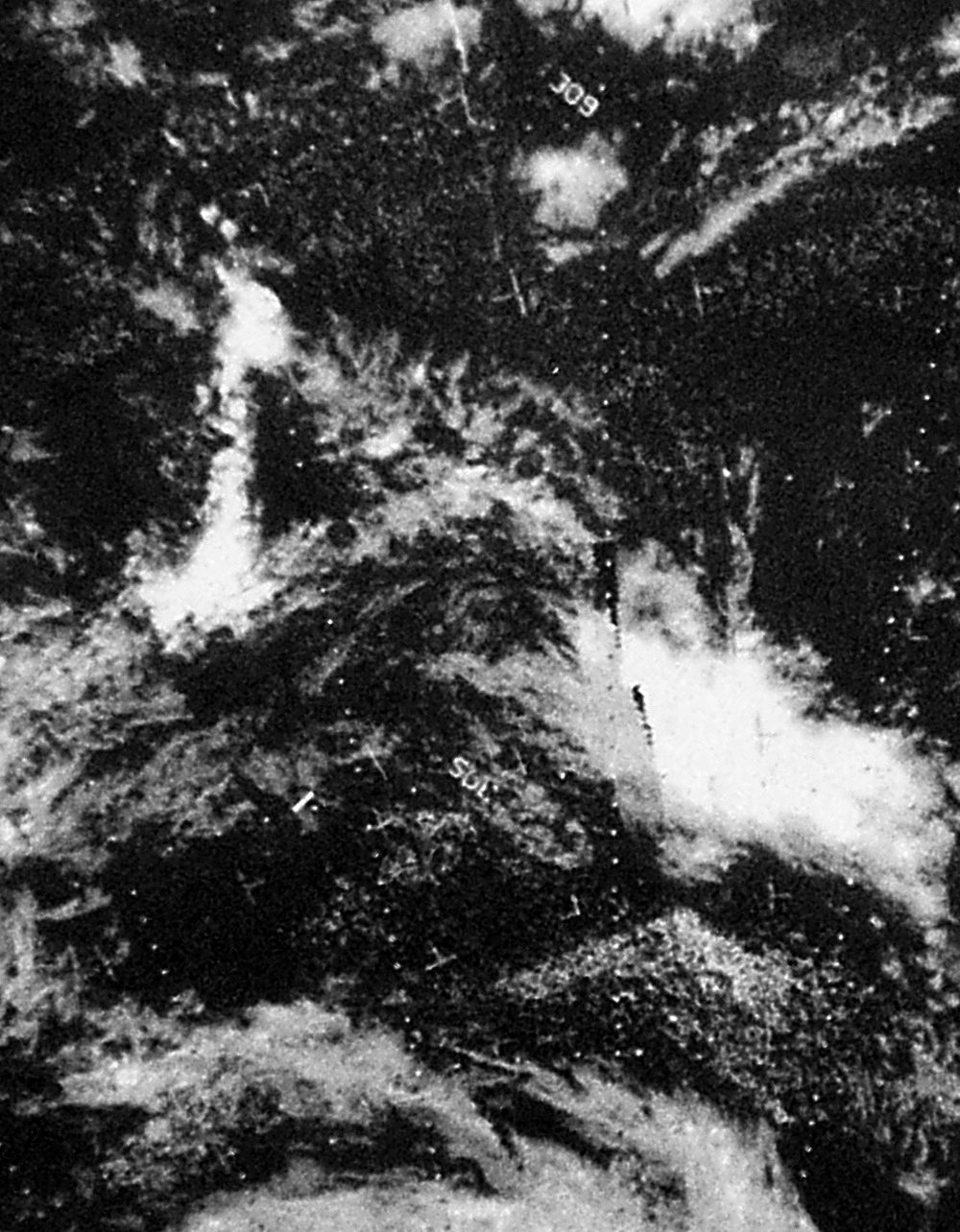
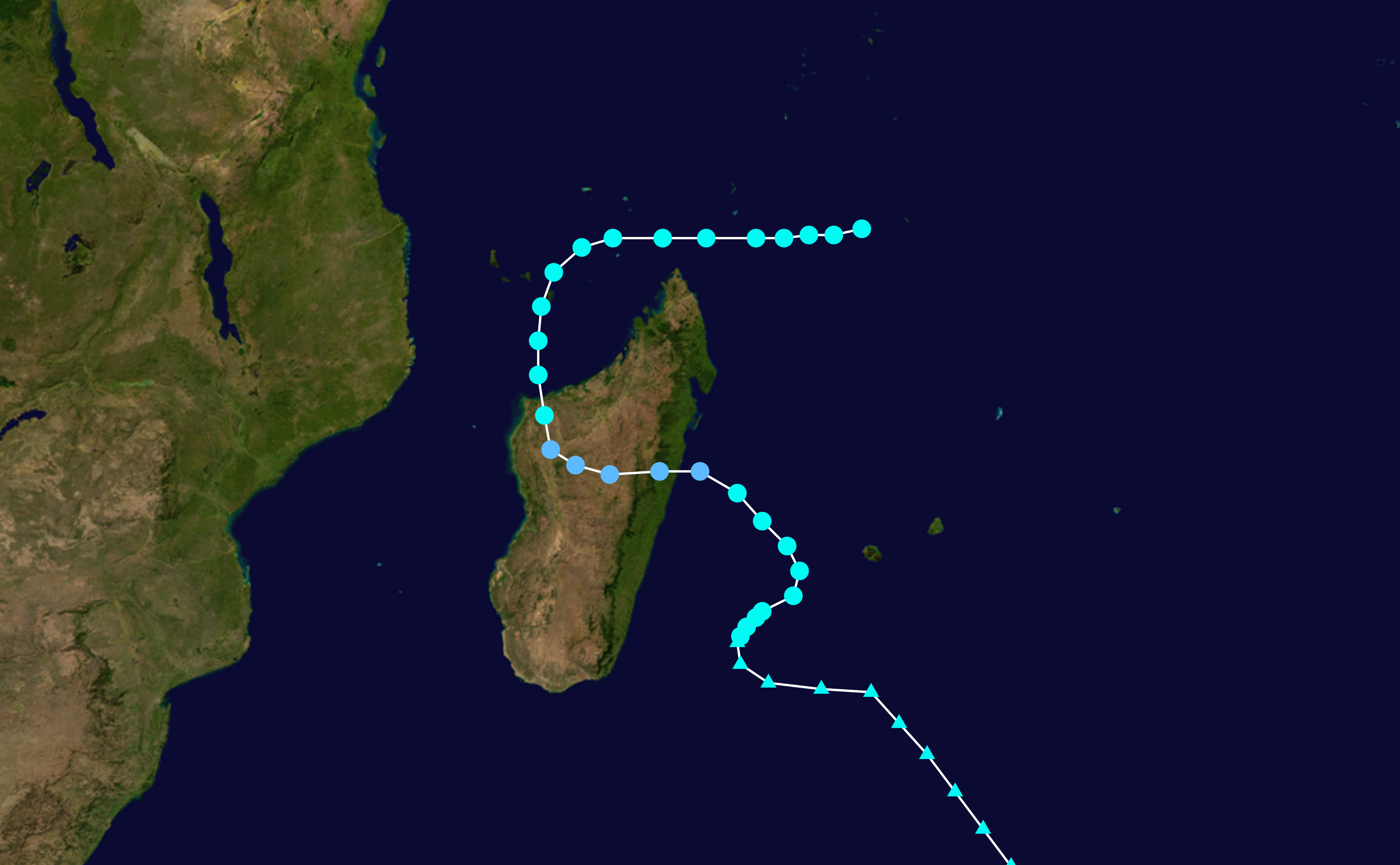
- Duration: December 11 – December 22
- Peak intensity: 100 km/h (65 mph) (10-min);

Colette existed from December 11 to December 22.

=== Tropical Cyclone Daphne ===
- Tropical cyclone (MFR)
- Category 1 tropical cyclone (SSHWS)
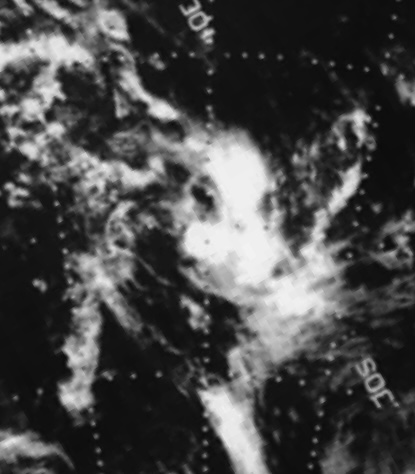
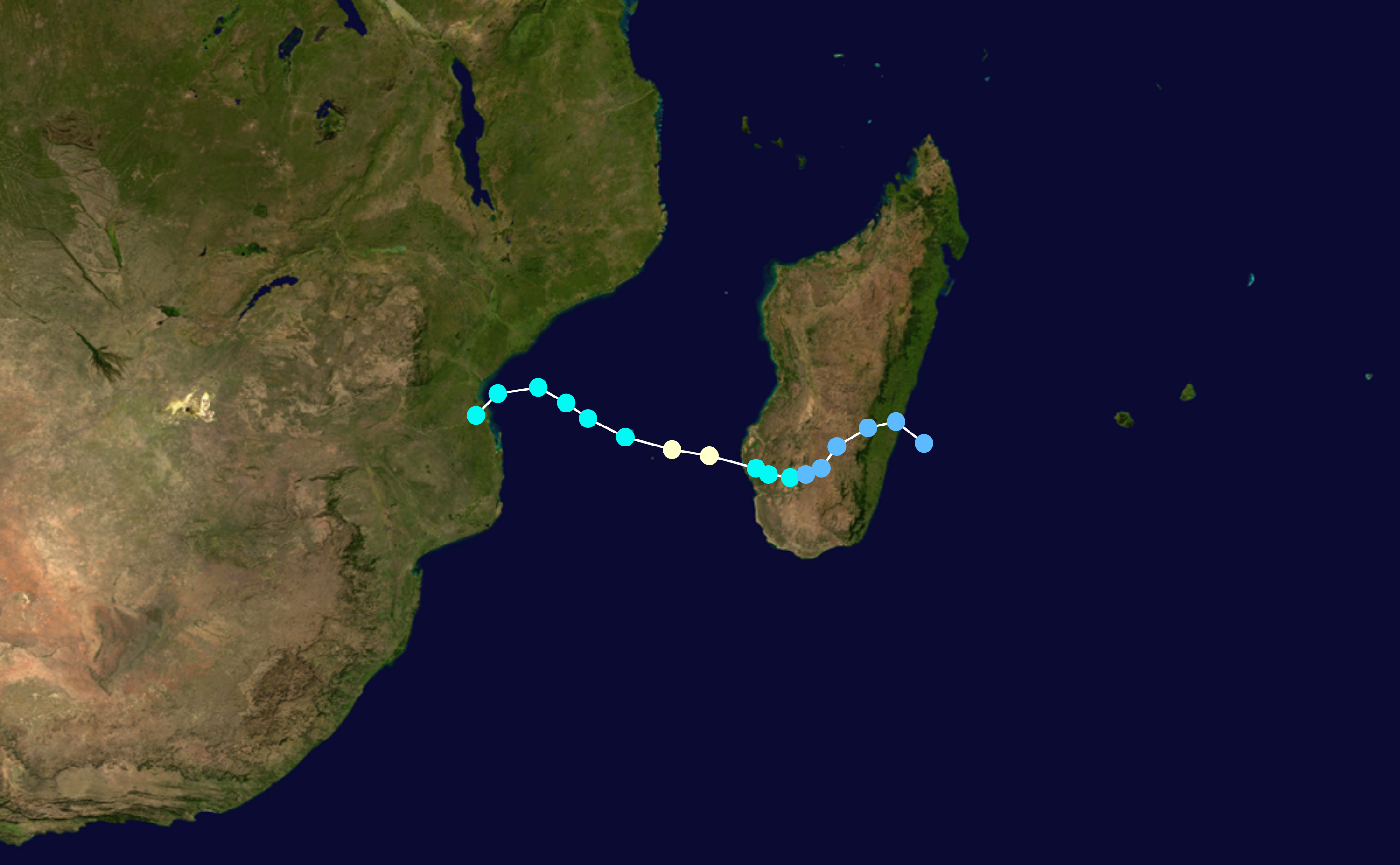
- Duration: December 22 – December 27
- Peak intensity: 120 km/h (75 mph) (10-min);

Daphne existed from December 22 to December 27.

=== Moderate Tropical Storm Clara–Elisa ===
- Moderate tropical storm (MFR)
- Category 1 tropical cyclone (SSHWS)
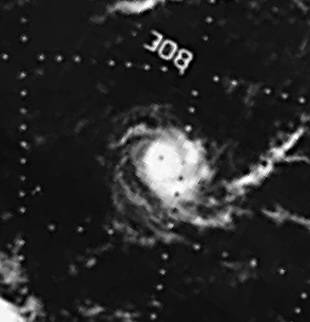
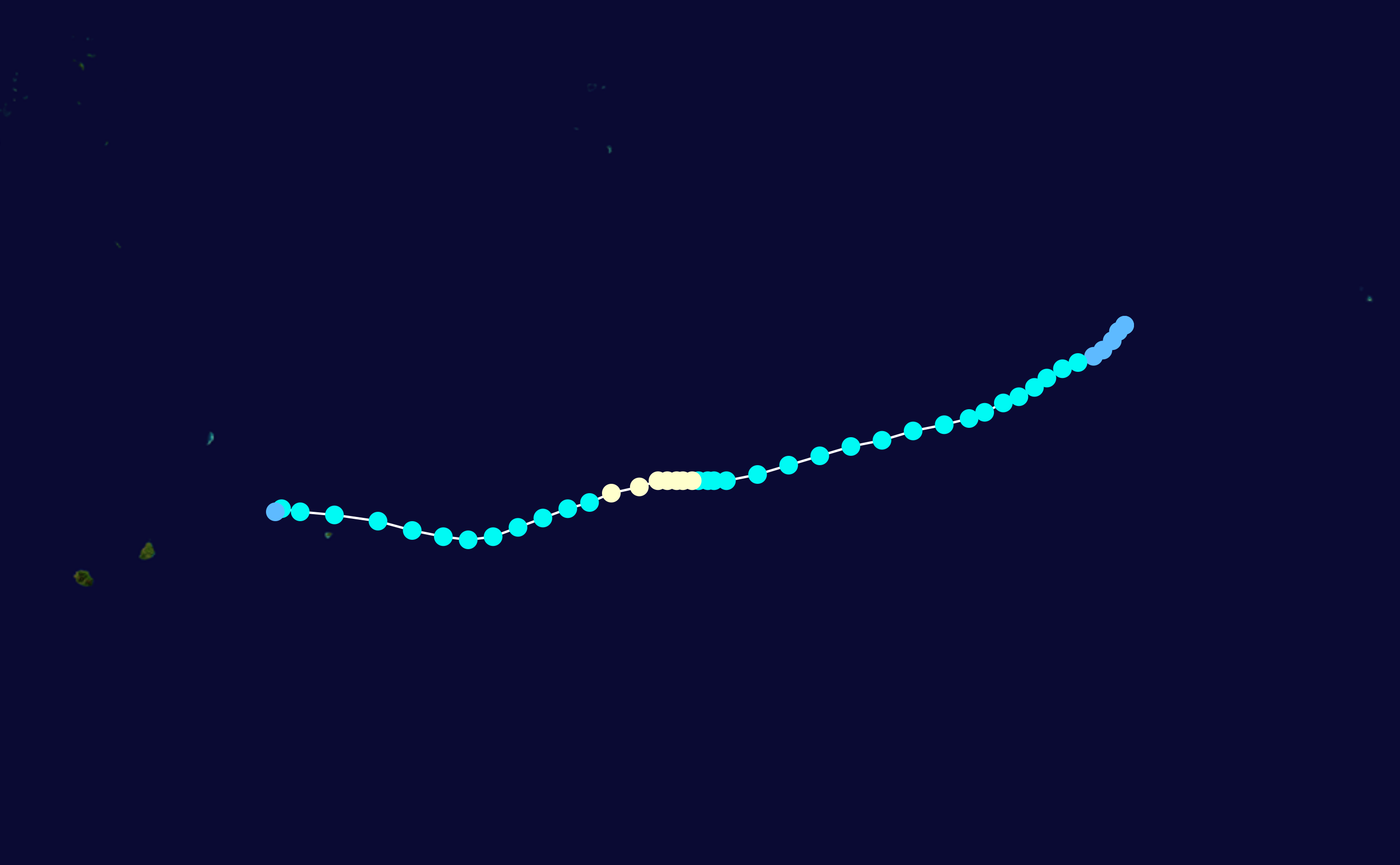
- Duration: December 24 – January 2
- Peak intensity: 65 km/h (40 mph) (10-min);

Clara-Elisa entered the basin on December 24 and was last noted on January 2.

=== Moderate Tropical Storm Florence ===
- Moderate tropical storm (MFR)
- Tropical storm (SSHWS)
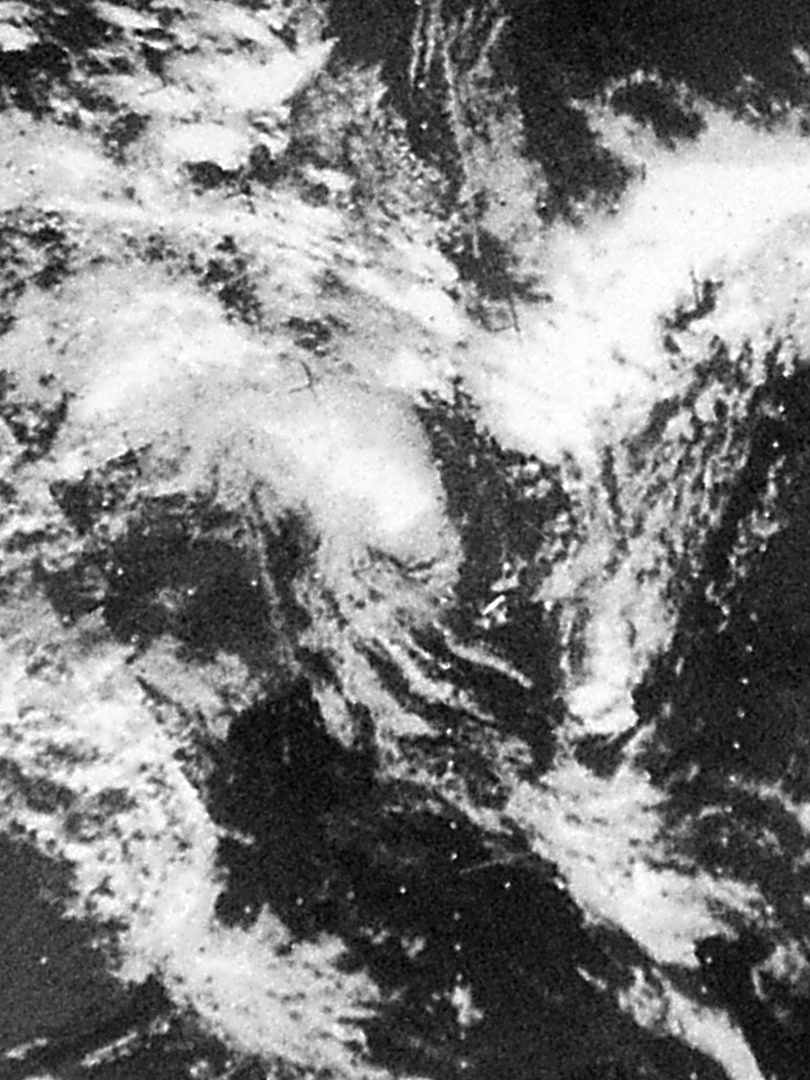
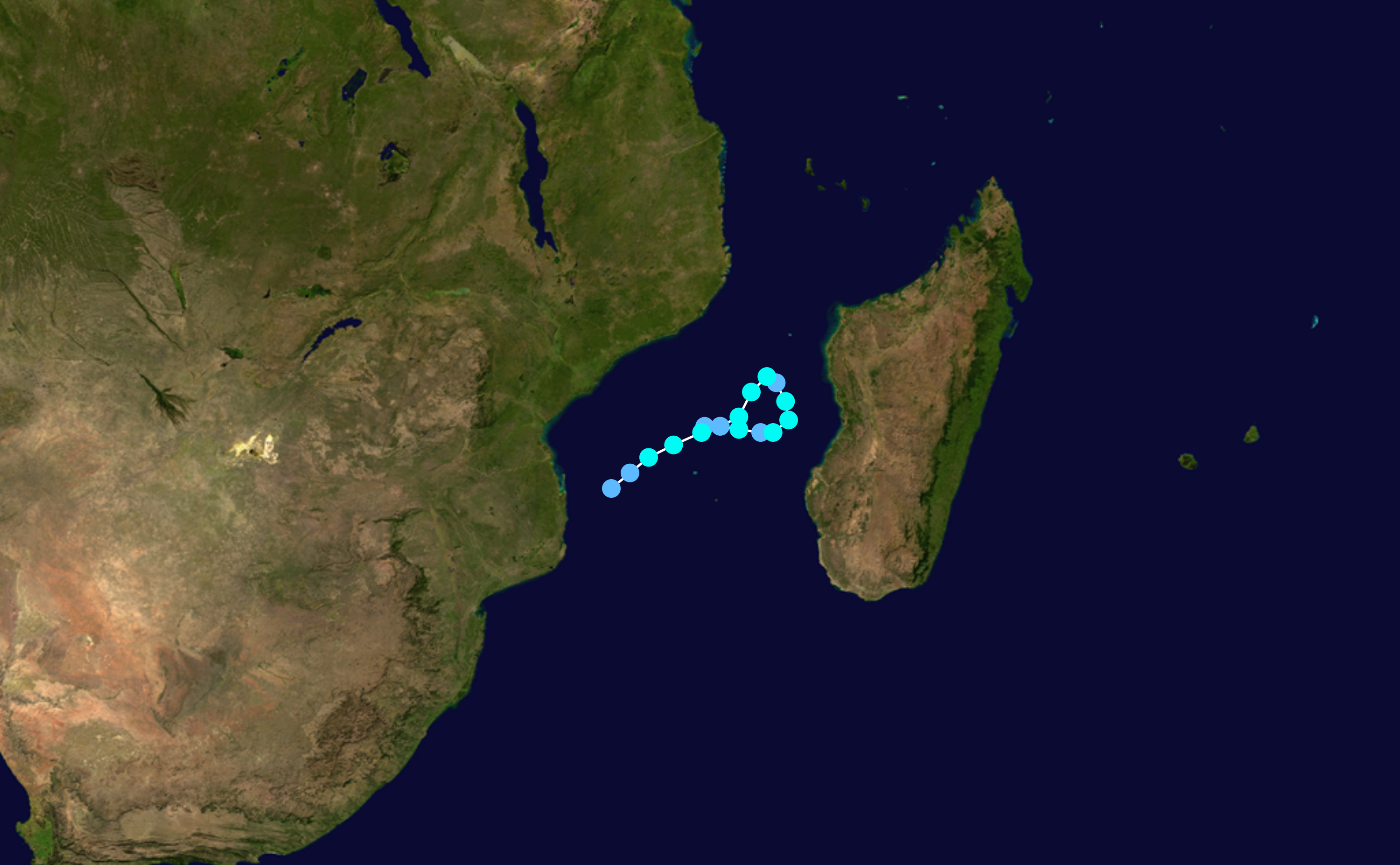
- Duration: January 3 – January 7
- Peak intensity: 65 km/h (40 mph) (10-min);

Florence existed from January 3 to January 7.

=== Tropical Cyclone Gilberte ===
- Tropical cyclone (MFR)
- Category 3 tropical cyclone (SSHWS)
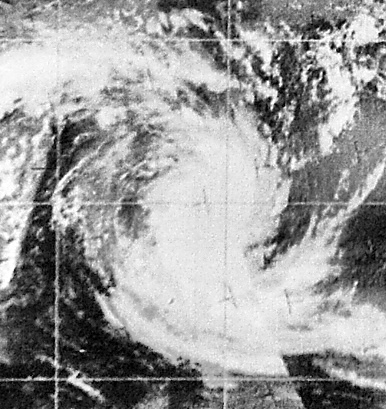
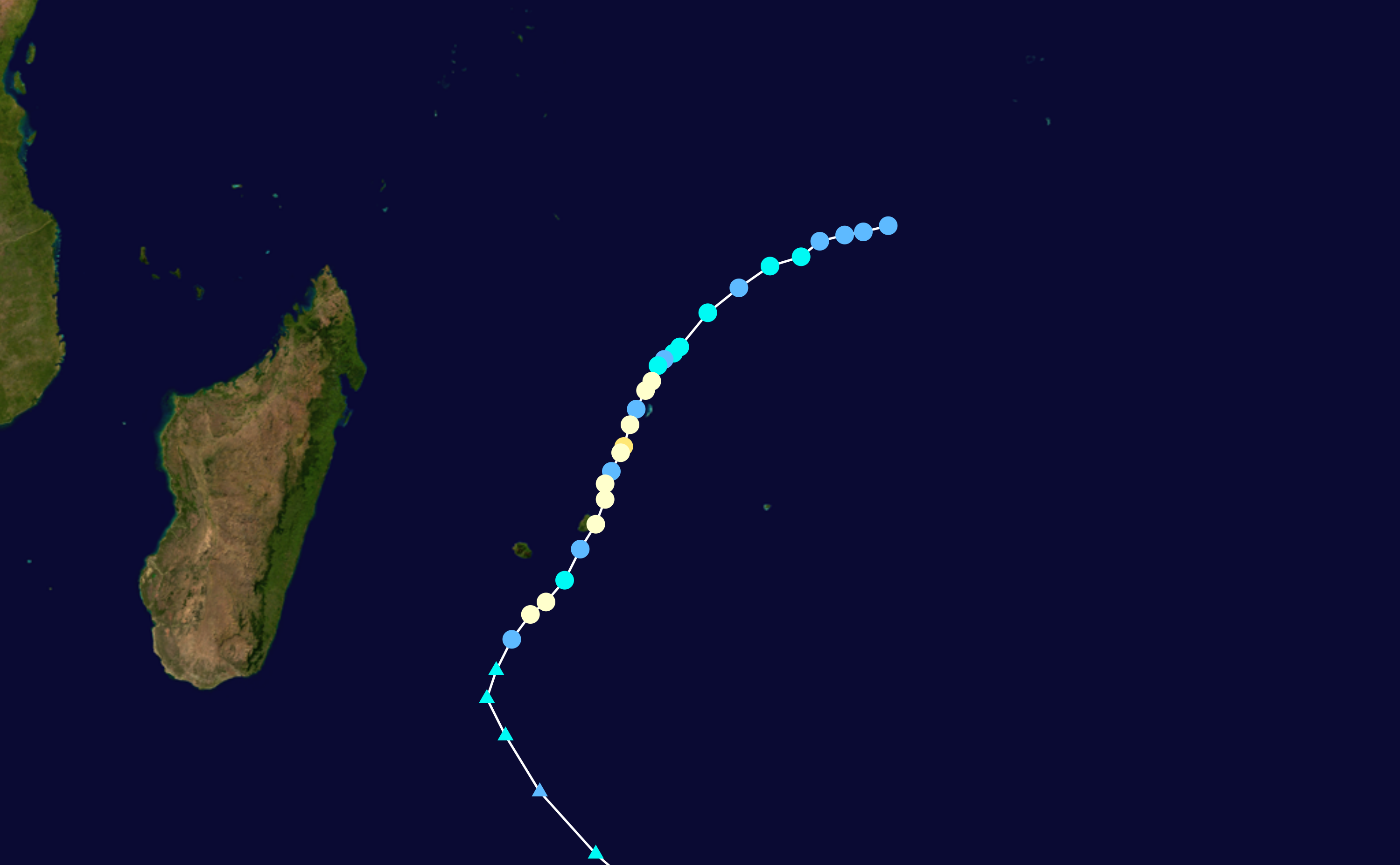
- Duration: January 8 – January 18
- Peak intensity: 140 km/h (85 mph) (10-min);

Gilberte existed from January 8 to January 18.

=== Tropical Depression Huguette ===
- Tropical depression (MFR)
- Tropical storm (SSHWS)
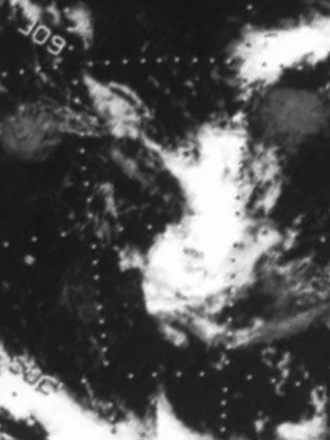
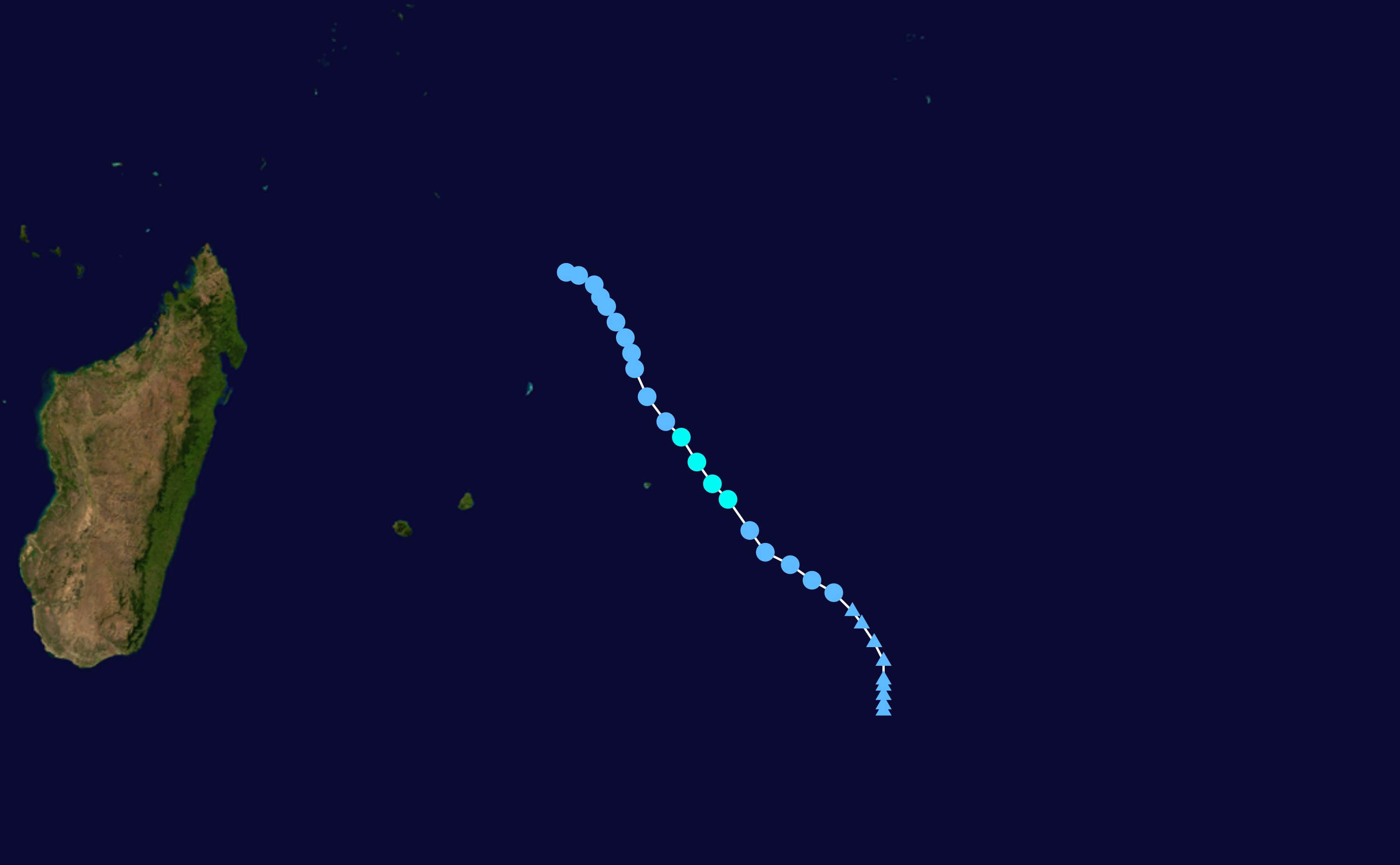
- Duration: February 7 – February 17
- Peak intensity: 55 km/h (35 mph) (10-min);

Huguette existed from February 7 to February 17.

=== Tropical Disturbance Irma ===
- Tropical disturbance (MFR)
- Tropical storm (SSHWS)
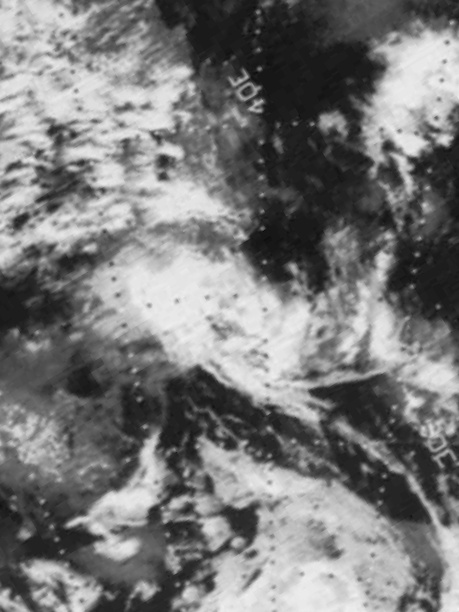
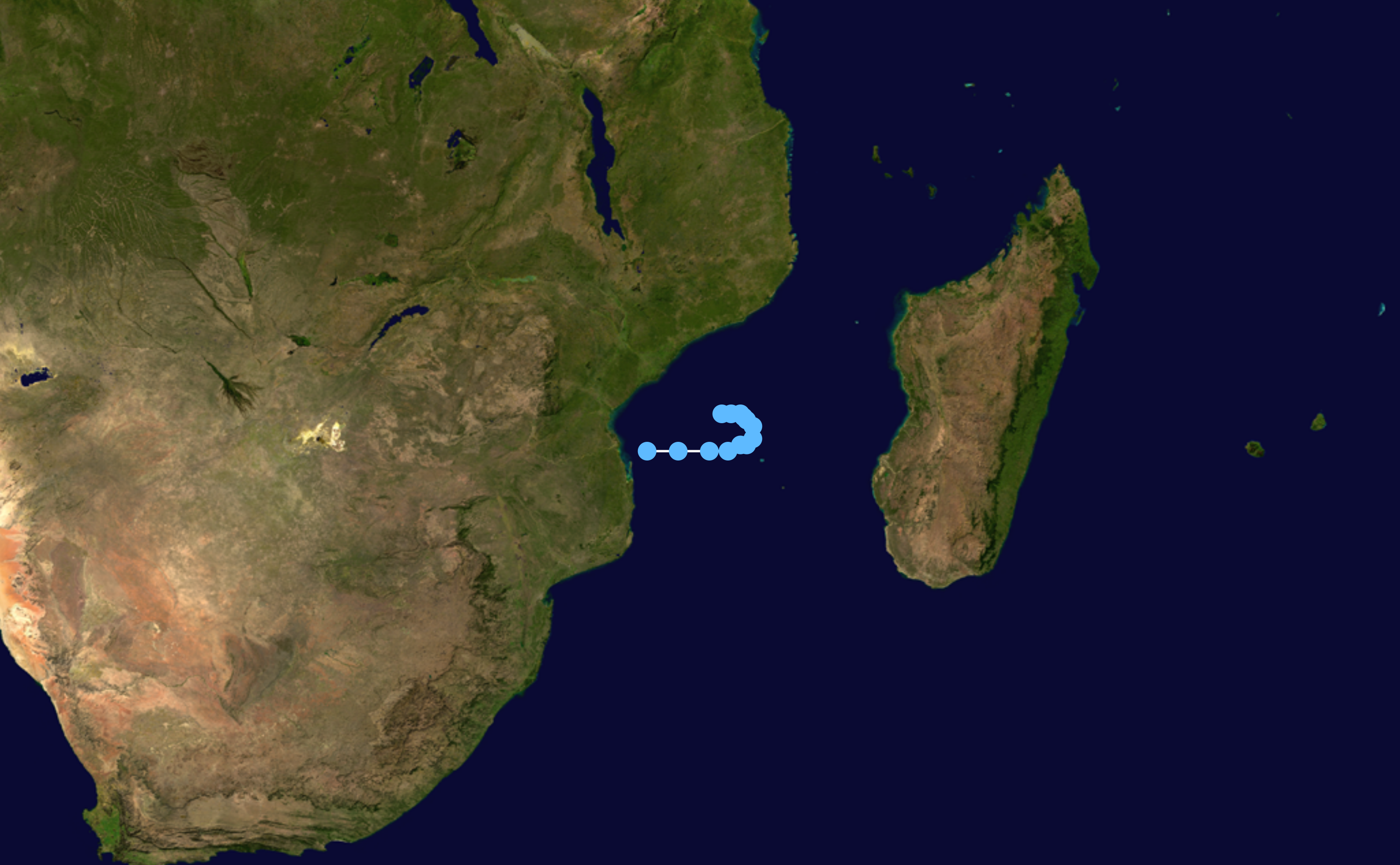
- Duration: February 21 – February 24
- Peak intensity: 45 km/h (30 mph) (10-min);

Irma existed from February 21 to February 24.

=== Tropical Cyclone Laura–Jackie ===
- Tropical cyclone (MFR)
- Category 1 tropical cyclone (SSHWS)
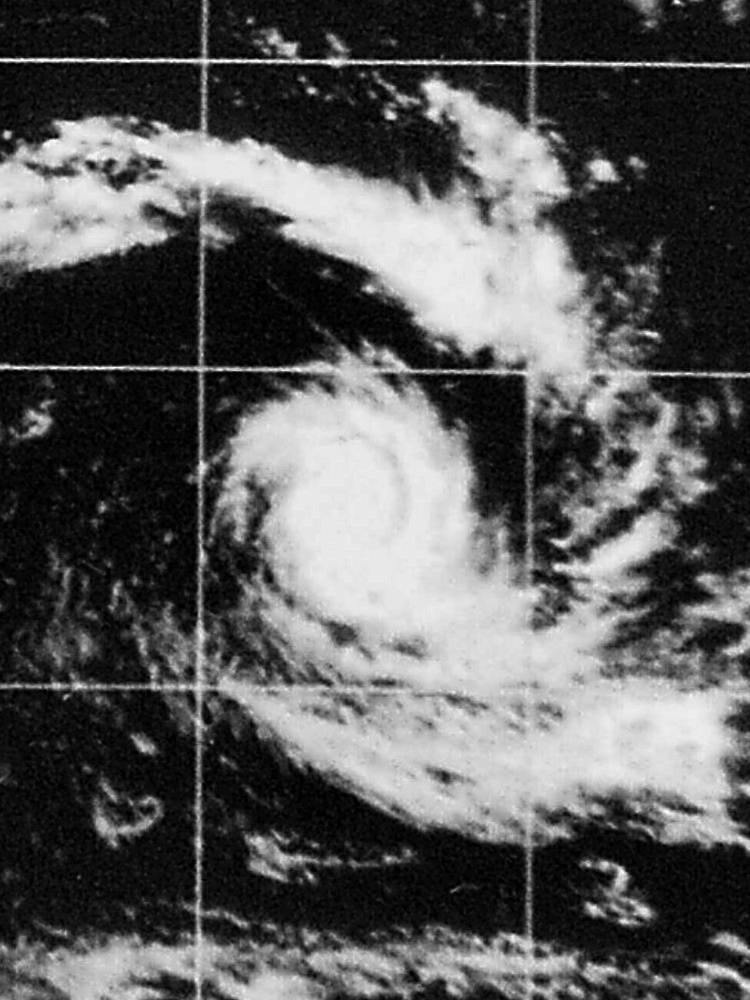
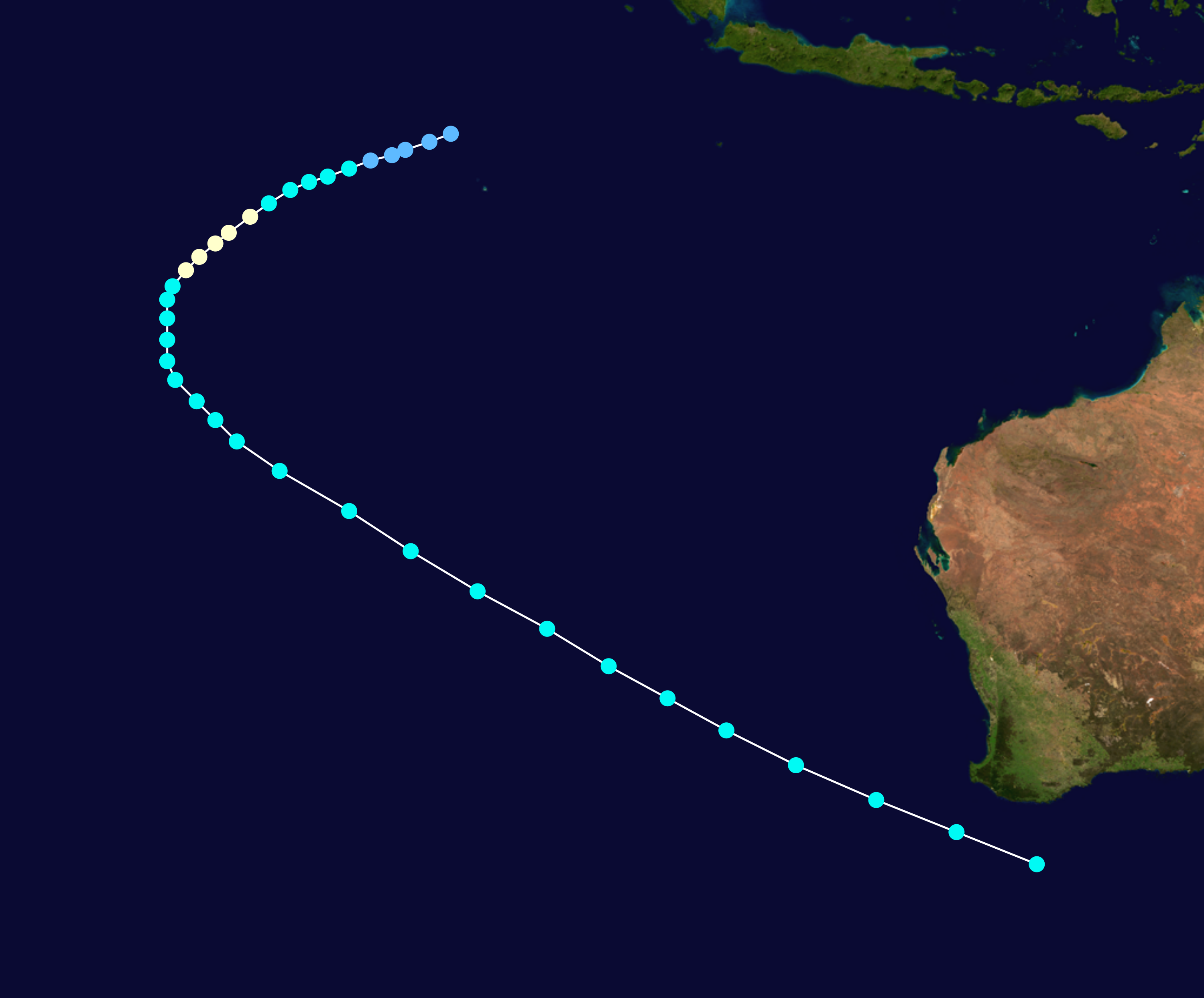
- Duration: April 7 – April 12 (exited basin)
- Peak intensity: 120 km/h (75 mph) (10-min); 970 hPa (mbar)

Laura formed on April 7. It exited the basin on April 12 into the Australian region, where it received the name Jackie.

=== Tropical Disturbance Kathy ===
- Tropical disturbance (MFR)
- Tropical storm (SSHWS)
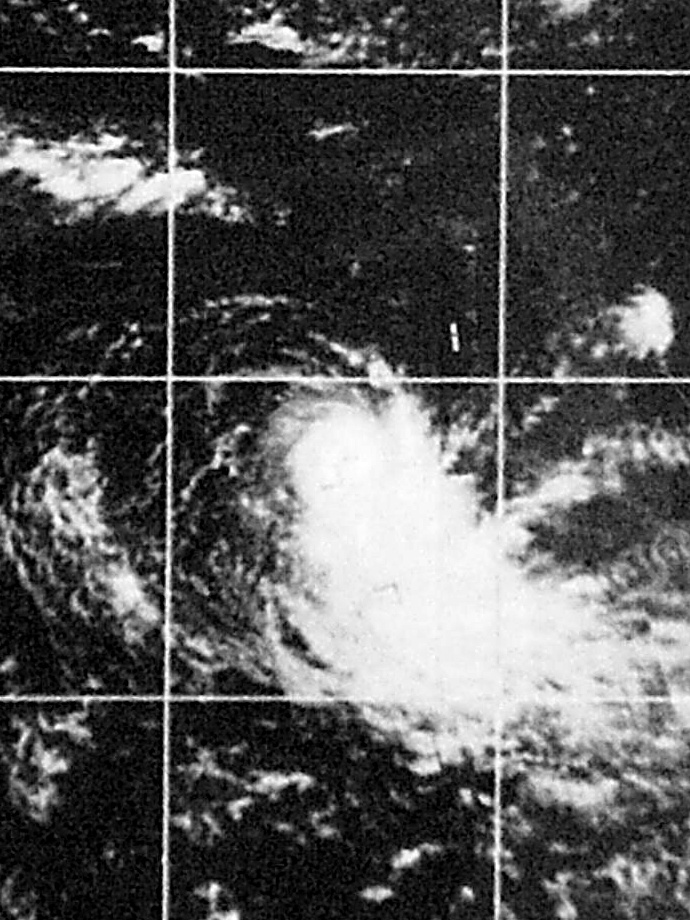
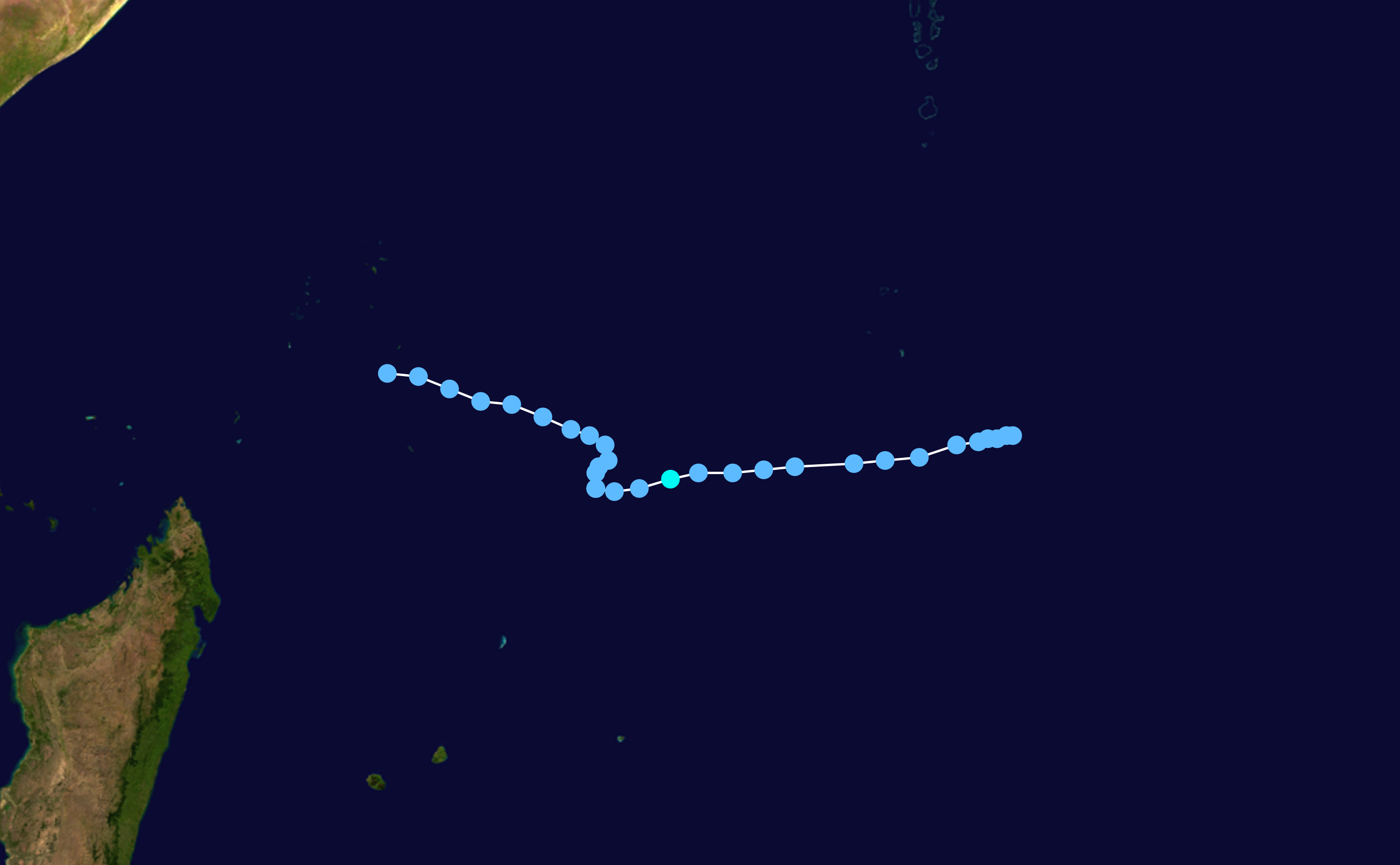
- Duration: May 12 – May 21
- Peak intensity: 45 km/h (30 mph) (10-min);

Kathy existed from May 12 to May 21.

== See also ==
- Atlantic hurricane seasons: 1966, 1967
- Eastern Pacific hurricane seasons: 1966, 1967
- Western Pacific typhoon seasons: 1966, 1967
- North Indian Ocean cyclone seasons: 1966, 1967
