= 1966 North Indian Ocean cyclone season =

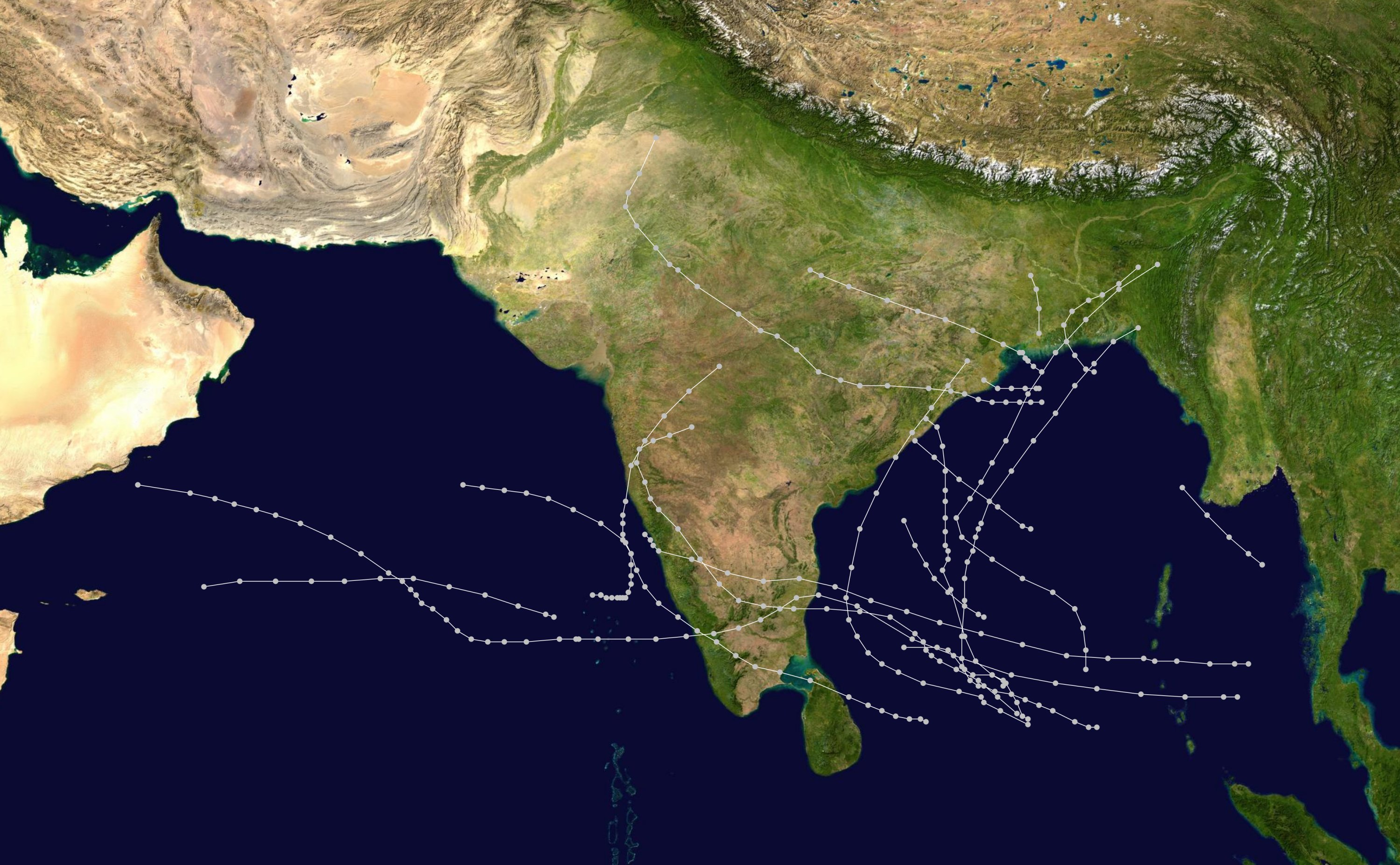
- Season summary map

Seasonal boundaries
- First system formed: April 28, 1966
- Last system dissipated: January 4, 1967

Seasonal statistics
- Depressions: 19
- Cyclonic storms: 8
- Severe cyclonic storms: 6
- Total fatalities: Unknown
- Total damage: Unknown

Related articles
- 1966 Atlantic hurricane season; 1966 Pacific hurricane season; 1966 Pacific typhoon season

The 1966 North Indian Ocean cyclone season had no bounds, but cyclones tend to form between April and December, with peaks in May and November. The season has no official bounds but cyclones tend to form between April and December. These dates conventionally delimit the period of each year when most tropical cyclones form in the northern Indian Ocean. There are two main seas in the North Indian Ocean—the Bay of Bengal to the east of the Indian subcontinent and the Arabian Sea to the west of India. The official Regional Specialized Meteorological Centre in this basin is the India Meteorological Department (IMD), while the Joint Typhoon Warning Center releases unofficial advisories. An average of four to six storms form in the North Indian Ocean every season with peaks in May and November. Cyclones occurring between the meridians 45°E and 100°E are included in the season by the IMD.

== Systems ==
=== Cyclone One (01B) ===
- Category 1 tropical cyclone (SSHWS)
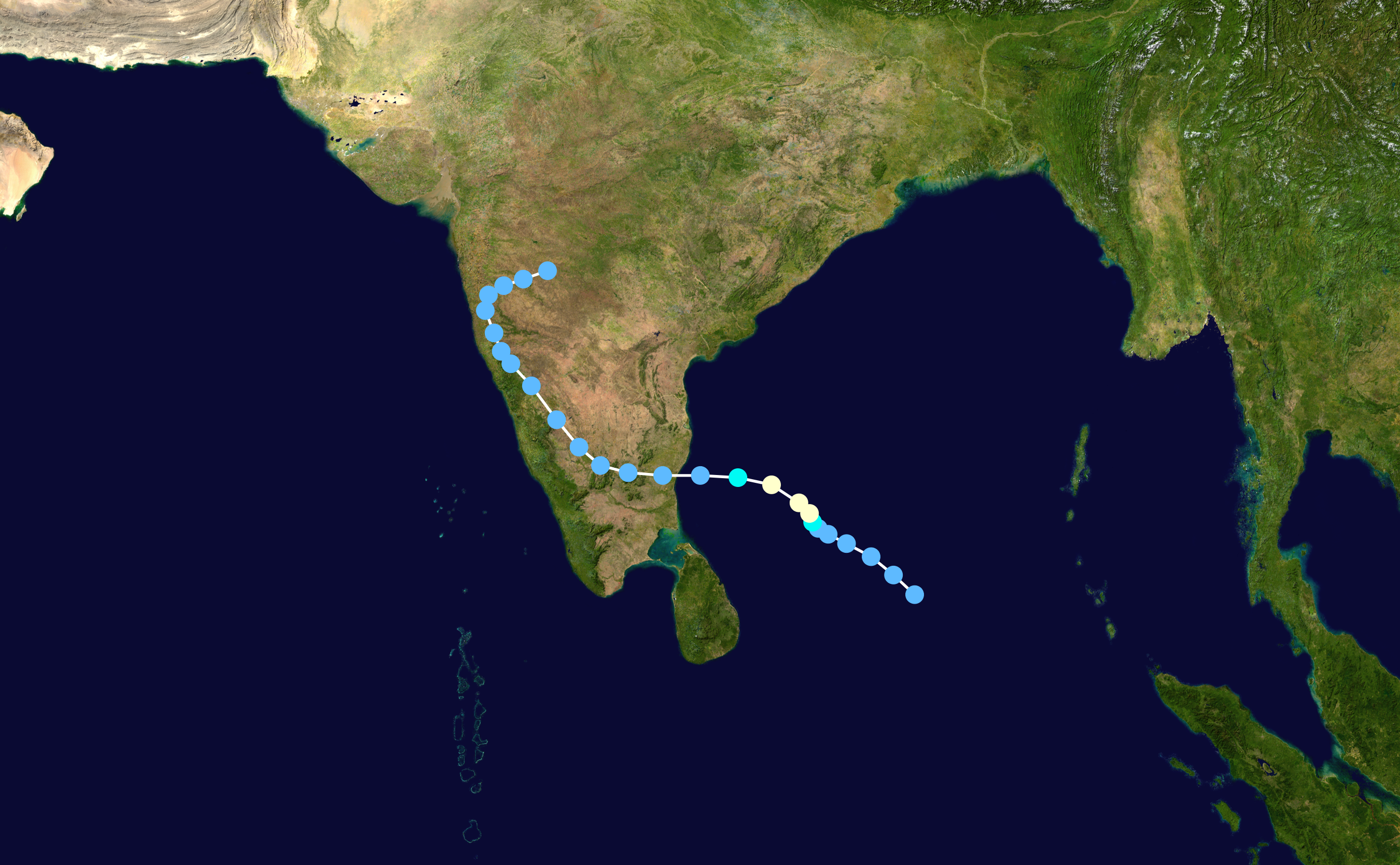
- Duration: April 28 – May 4
- Peak intensity: 120 km/h (75 mph) (1-min);

=== Depression Two (02B) ===
- Tropical depression (SSHWS)
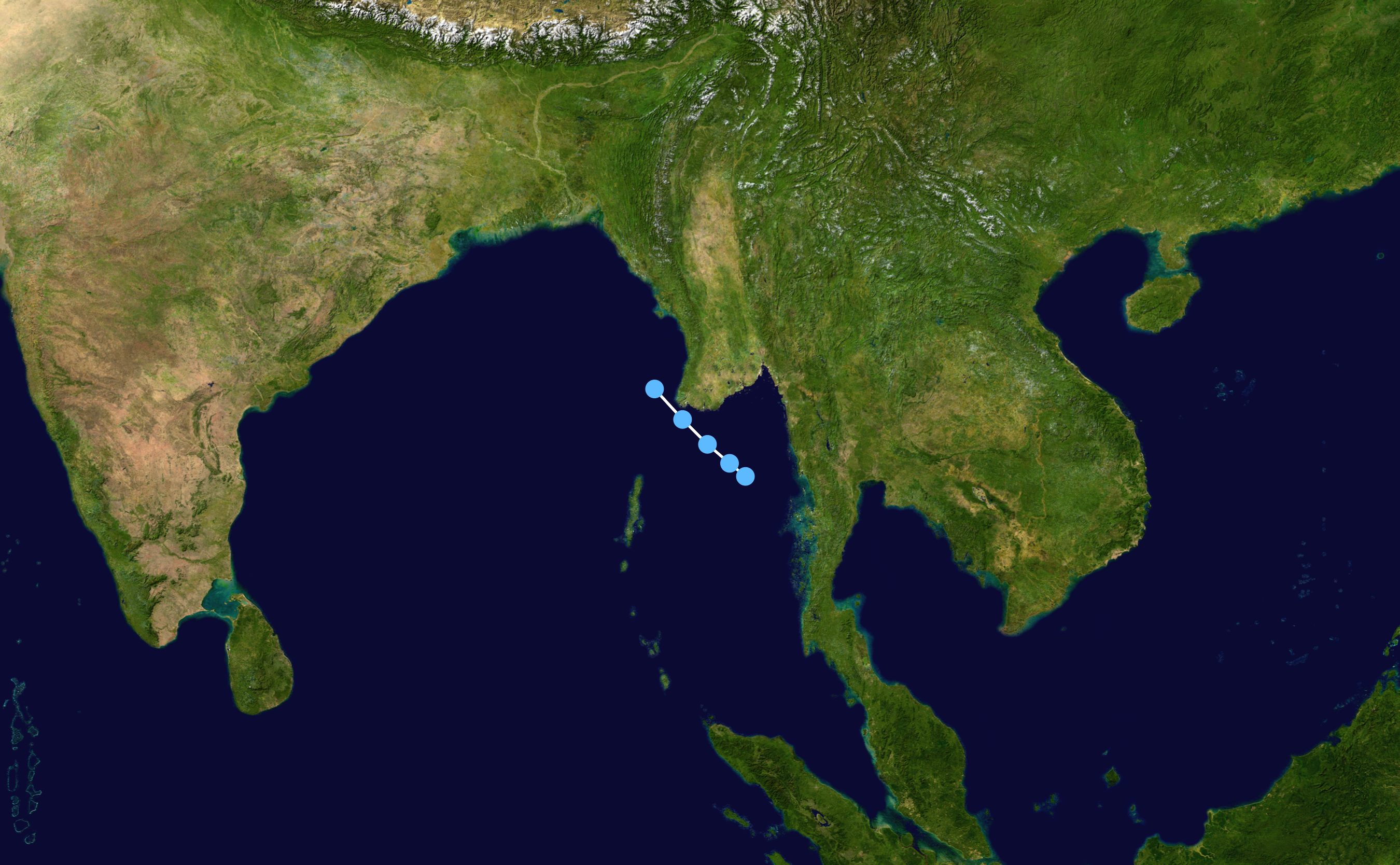
- Duration: May 16 – May 18
- Peak intensity: 45 km/h (30 mph) (1-min);

=== Depression Three (03B) ===
- Tropical depression (SSHWS)
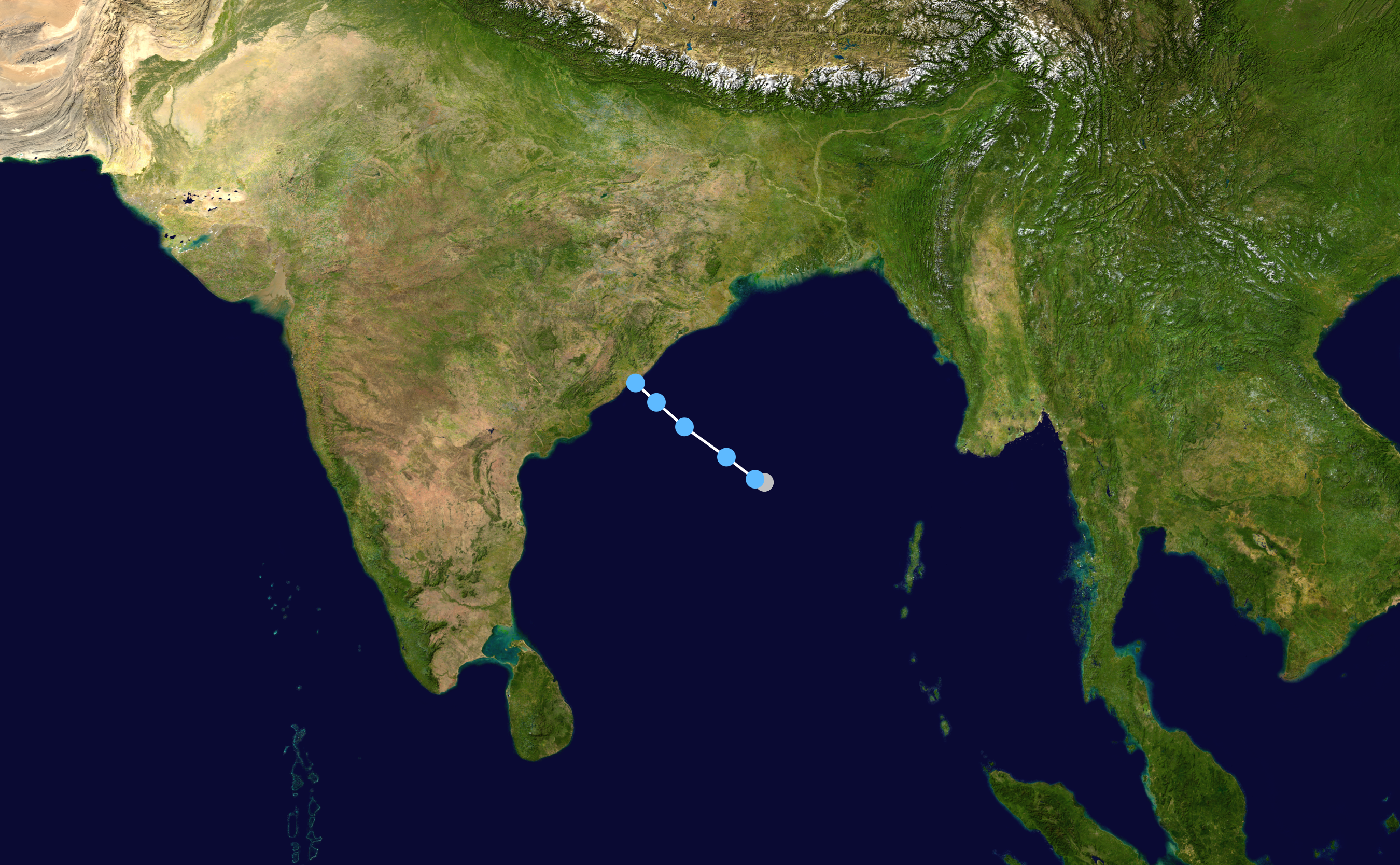
- Duration: June 2 – June 3
- Peak intensity: 45 km/h (30 mph) (1-min);

=== Depression Four (04B) ===
- Tropical depression (SSHWS)
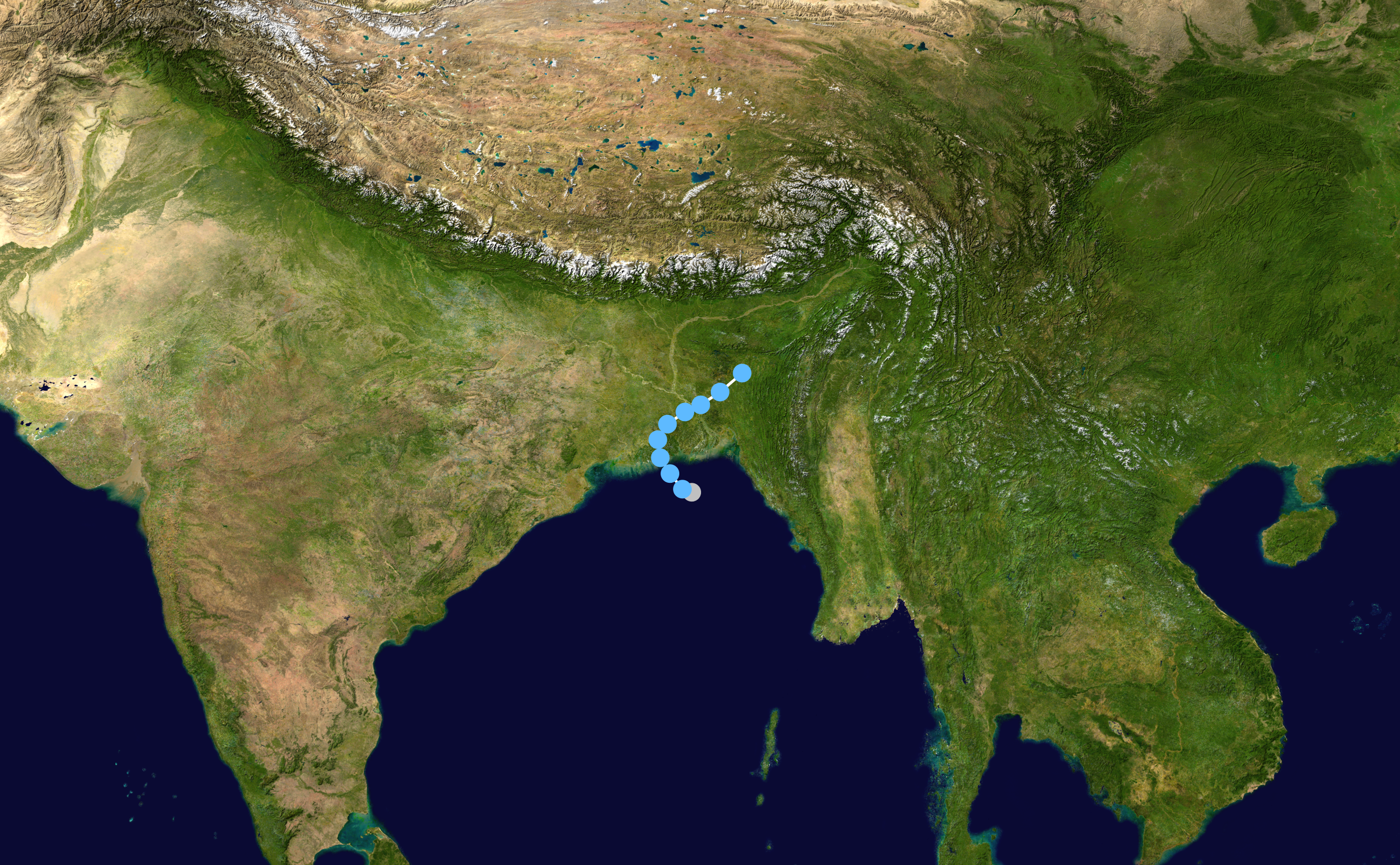
- Duration: June 15 – June 18
- Peak intensity: 45 km/h (30 mph) (1-min);

=== Depression Five (05B) ===
- Tropical depression (SSHWS)
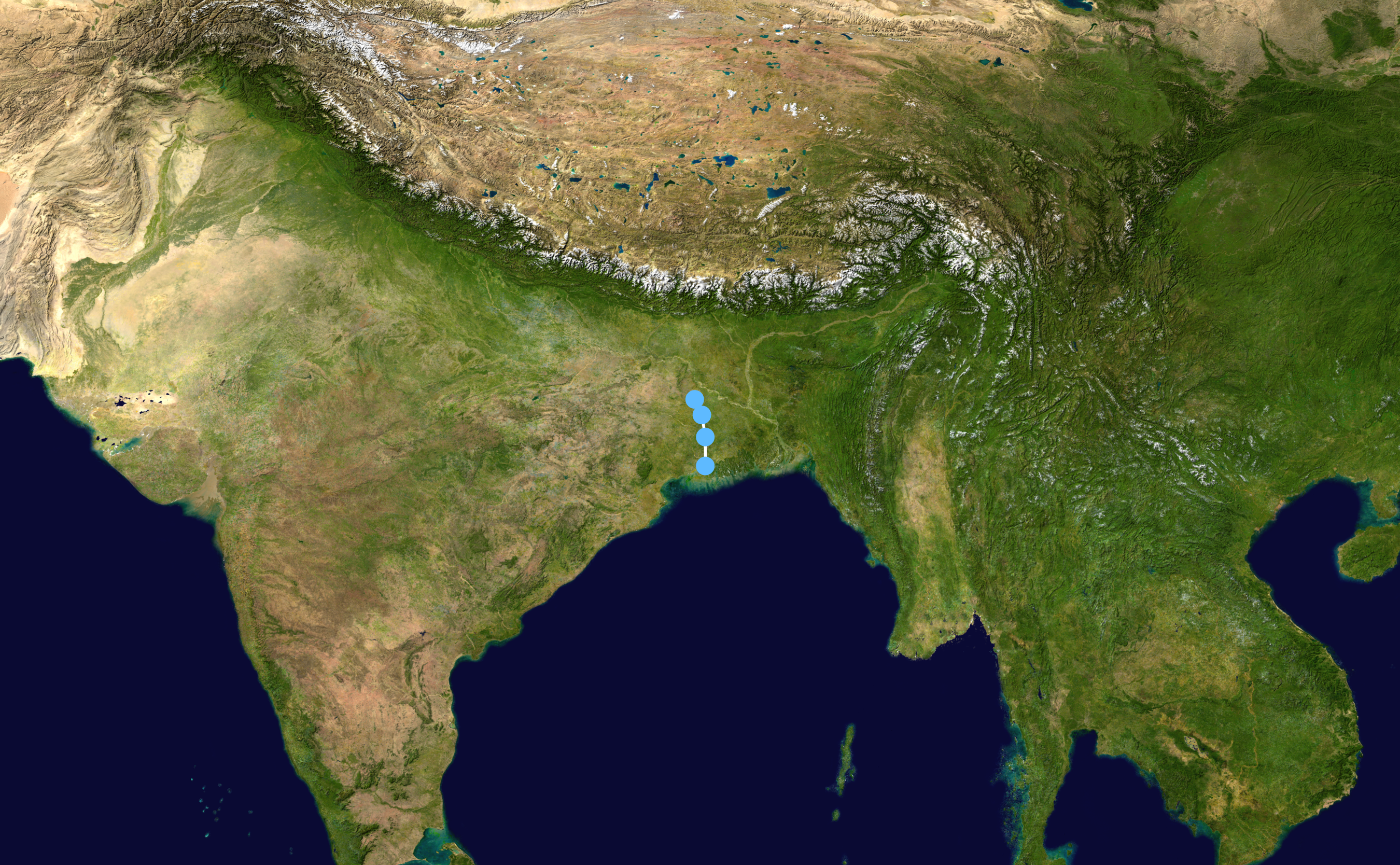
- Duration: June 28 – June 29
- Peak intensity: 45 km/h (30 mph) (1-min);

=== Depression Six (06B) ===
- Tropical depression (SSHWS)
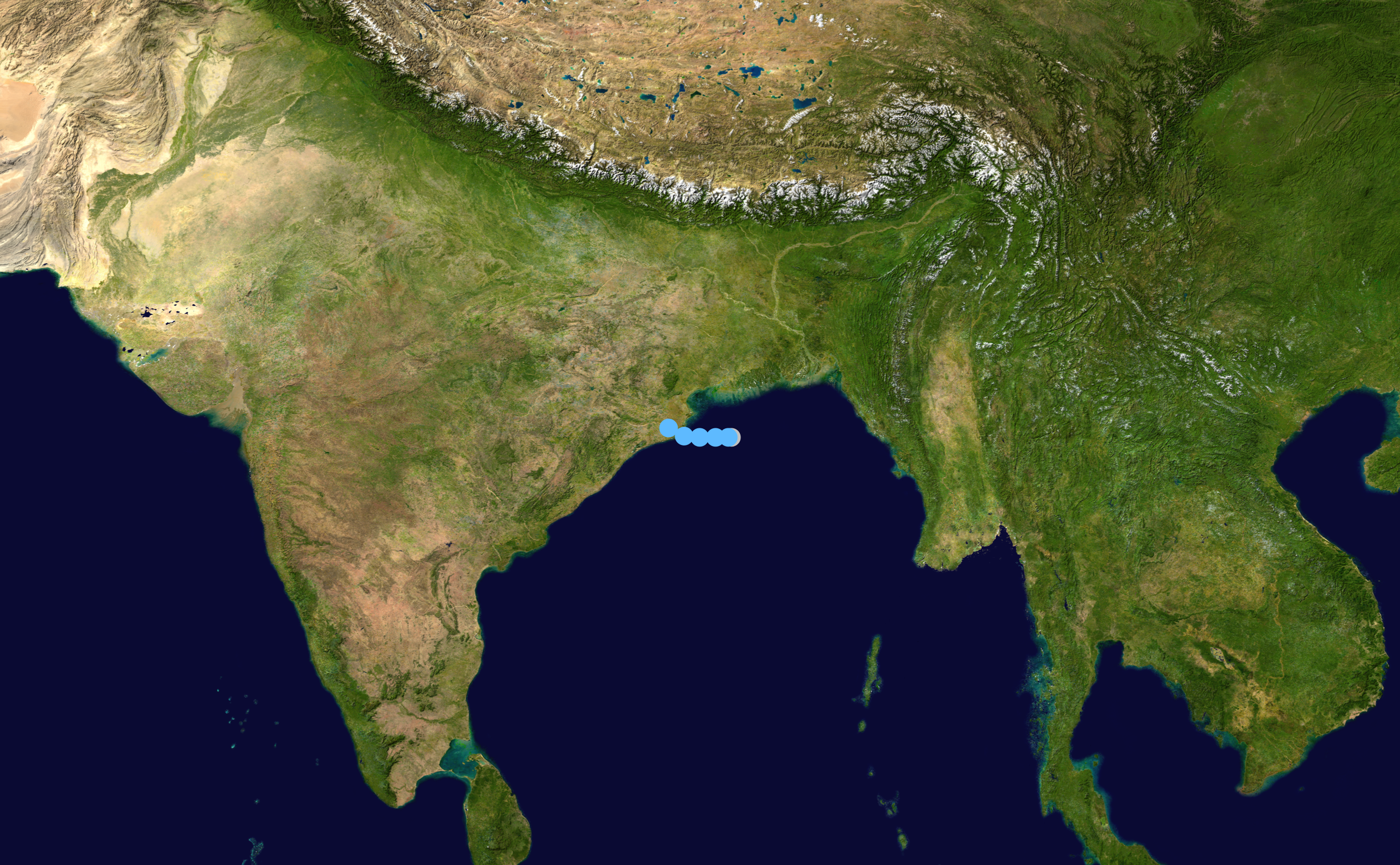
- Duration: July 16 – July 18
- Peak intensity: 45 km/h (30 mph) (1-min);

=== Depression Seven (07B) ===
- Tropical depression (SSHWS)
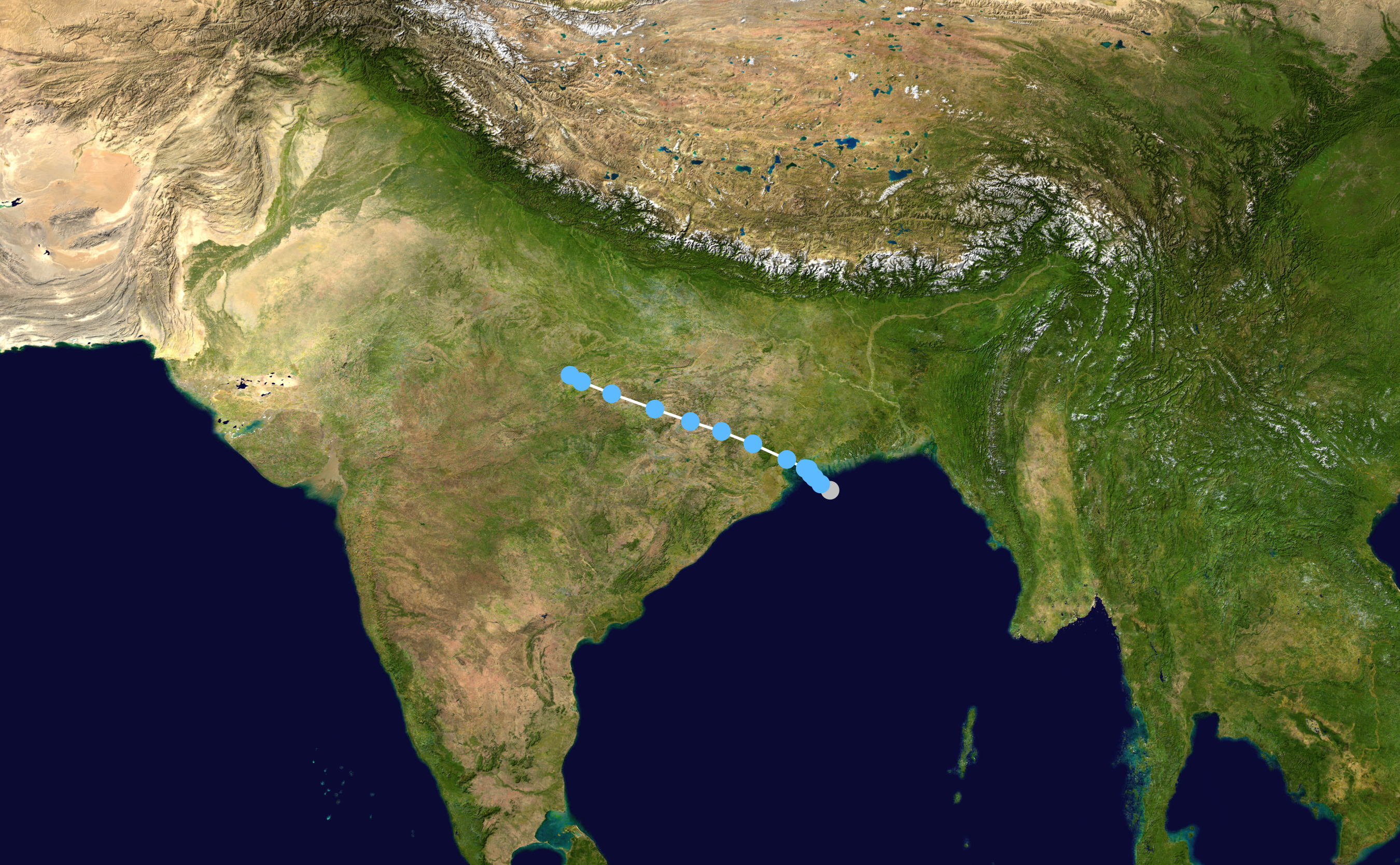
- Duration: July 27 – July 31
- Peak intensity: 45 km/h (30 mph) (1-min);

=== Depression Eight (08B) ===
- Tropical depression (SSHWS)
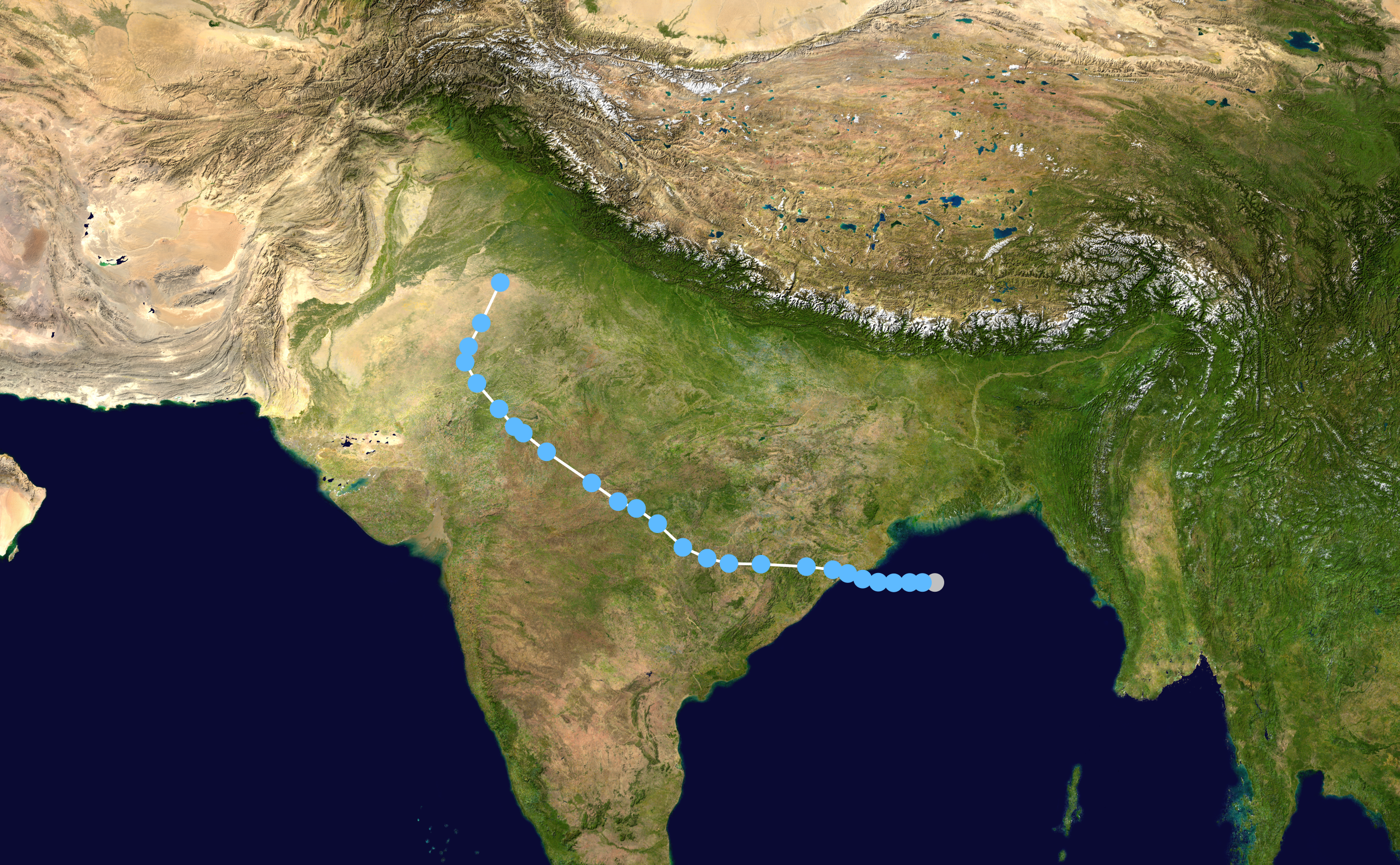
- Duration: September 2 – September 8
- Peak intensity: 45 km/h (30 mph) (1-min);

=== Cyclone Nine (09B) ===
- Category 1 tropical cyclone (SSHWS)
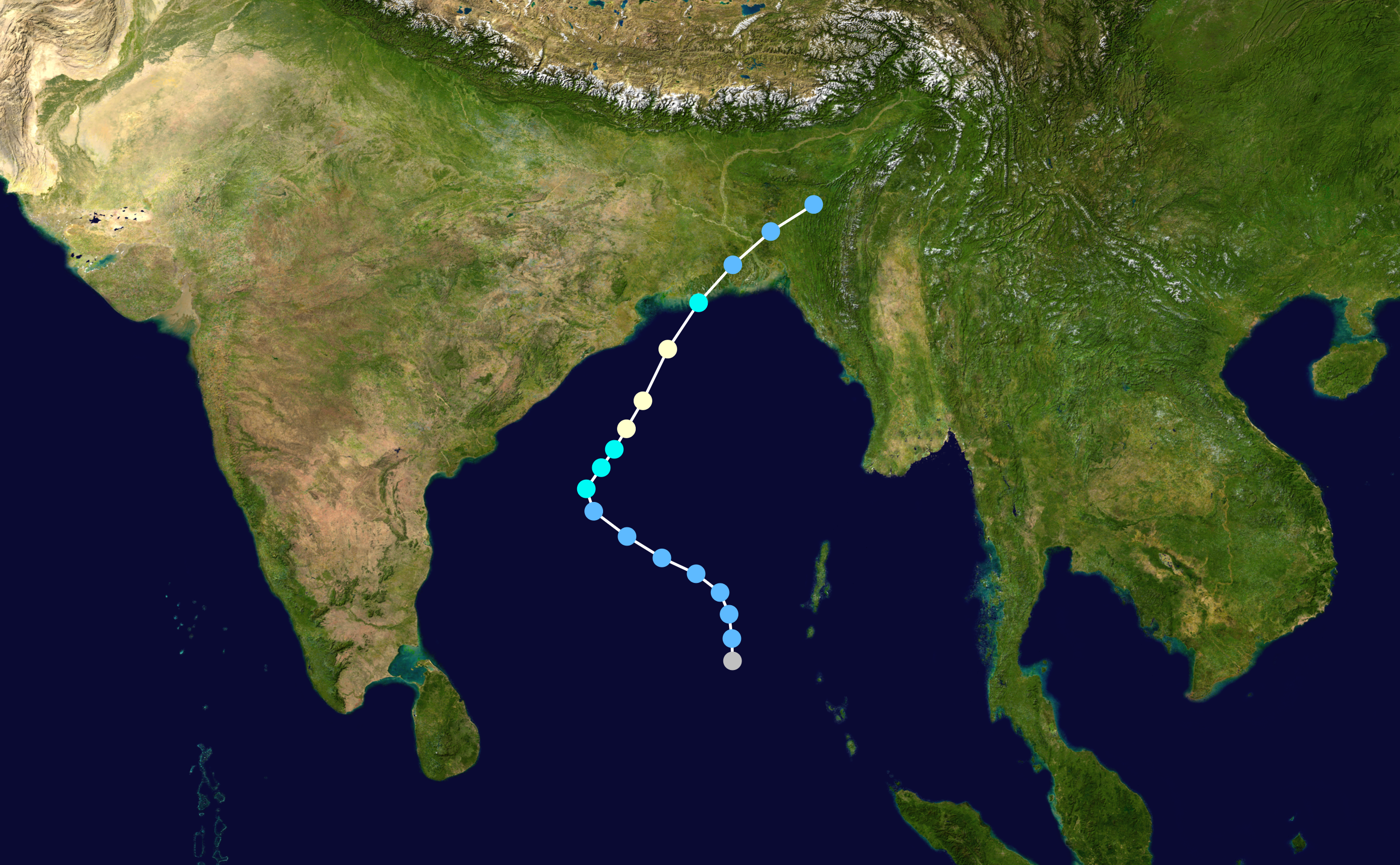
- Duration: September 27 – October 1
- Peak intensity: 120 km/h (75 mph) (1-min);

=== Tropical Storm Ten (10A) ===
- Tropical storm (SSHWS)
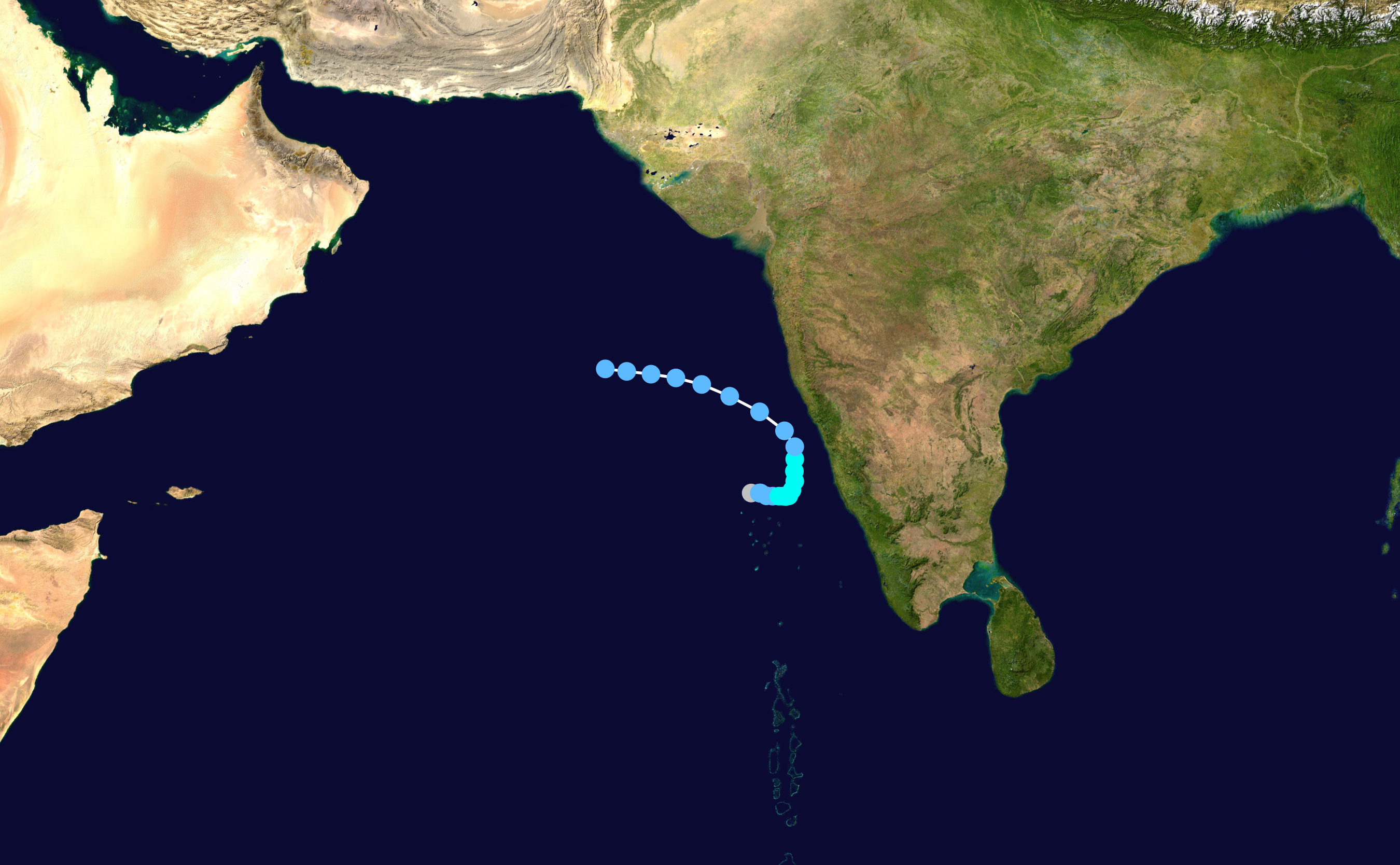
- Duration: September 28 – October 5
- Peak intensity: 65 km/h (40 mph) (1-min);

=== Depression Eleven (11B) ===
- Tropical depression (SSHWS)
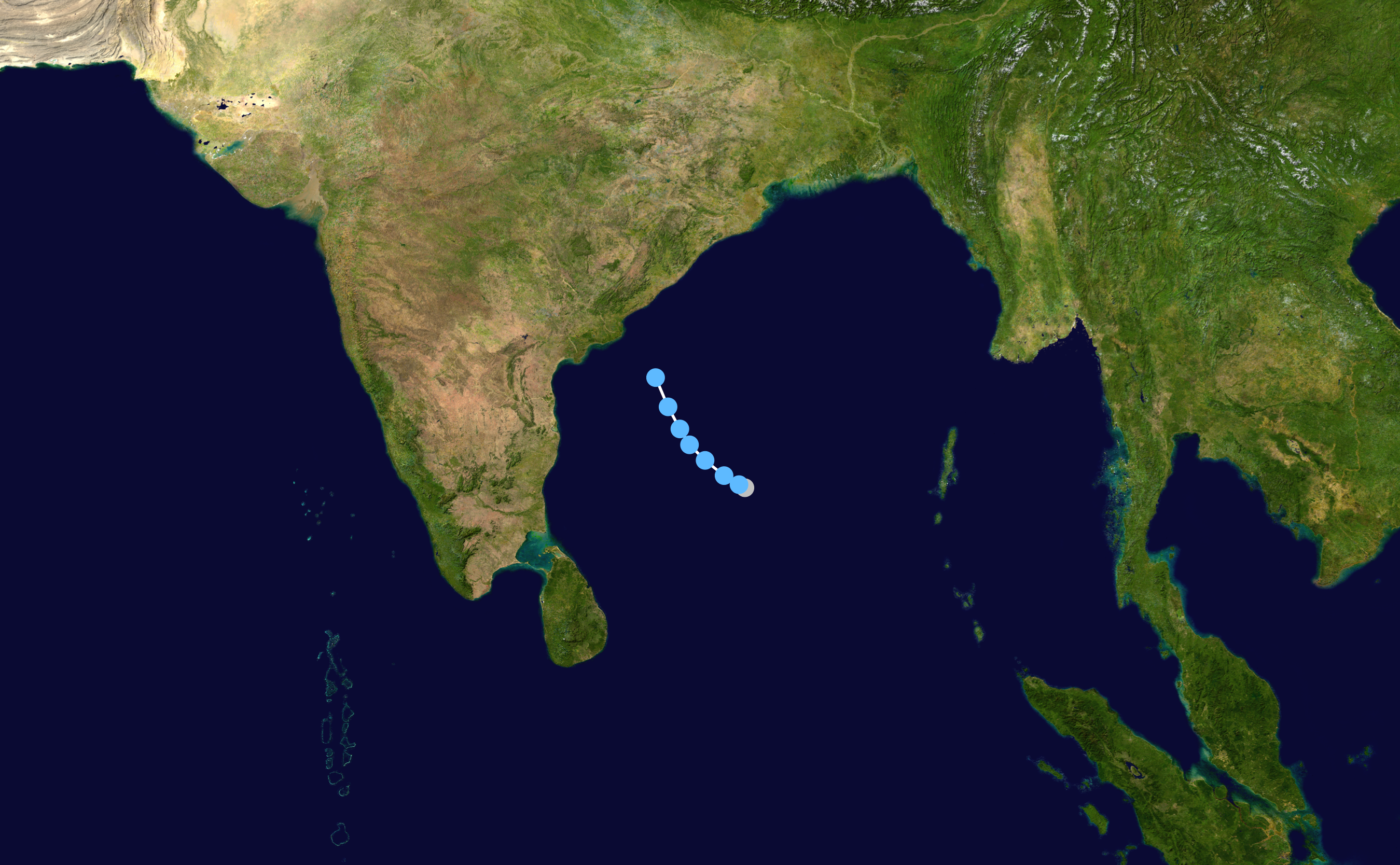
- Duration: October 10 – October 12
- Peak intensity: 45 km/h (30 mph) (1-min);

=== Depression Twelve (12A) ===
- Tropical depression (SSHWS)
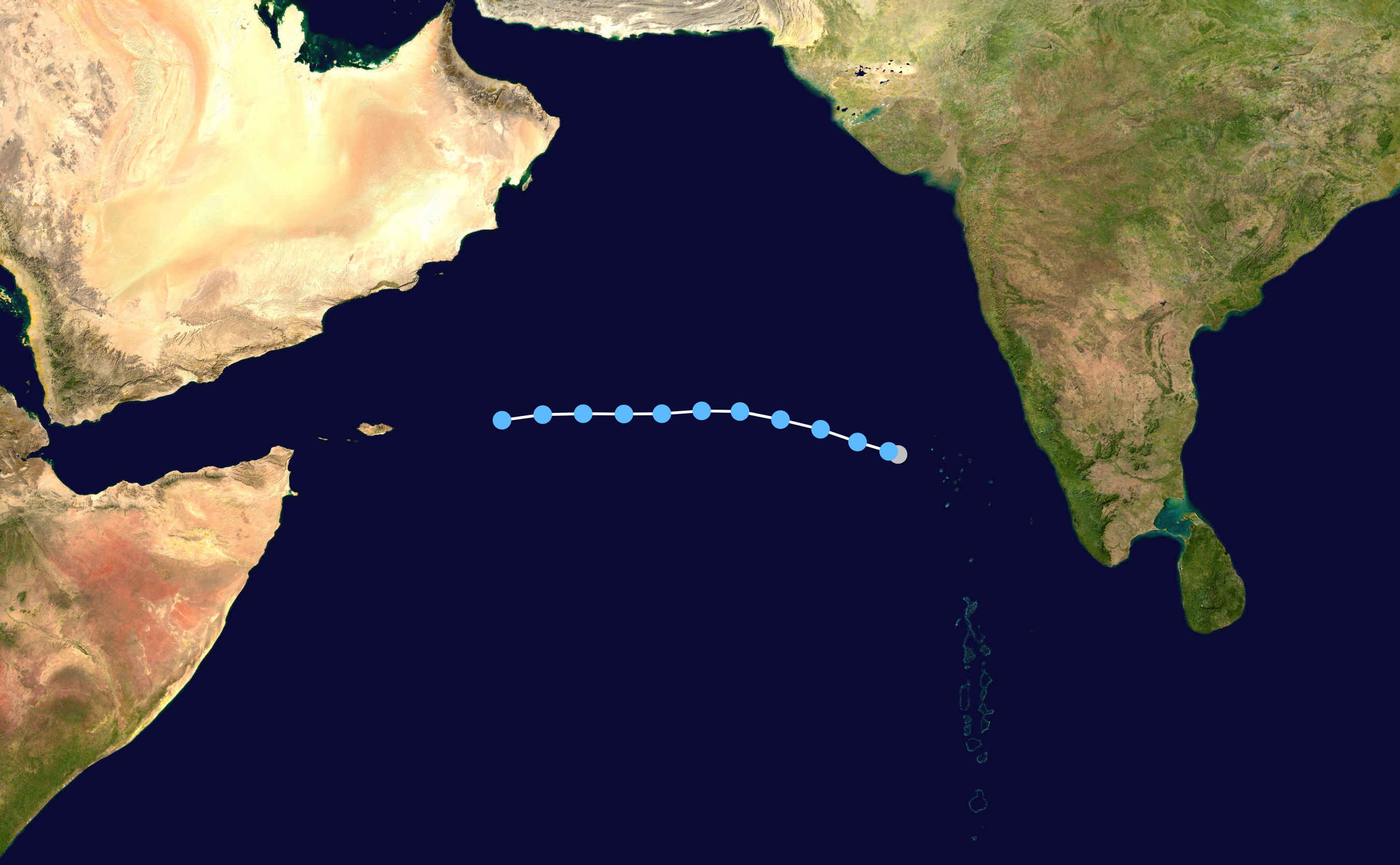
- Duration: October 21 – October 24
- Peak intensity: 45 km/h (30 mph) (1-min);

=== Cyclone Thirteen (13B) ===
- Category 1 tropical cyclone (SSHWS)
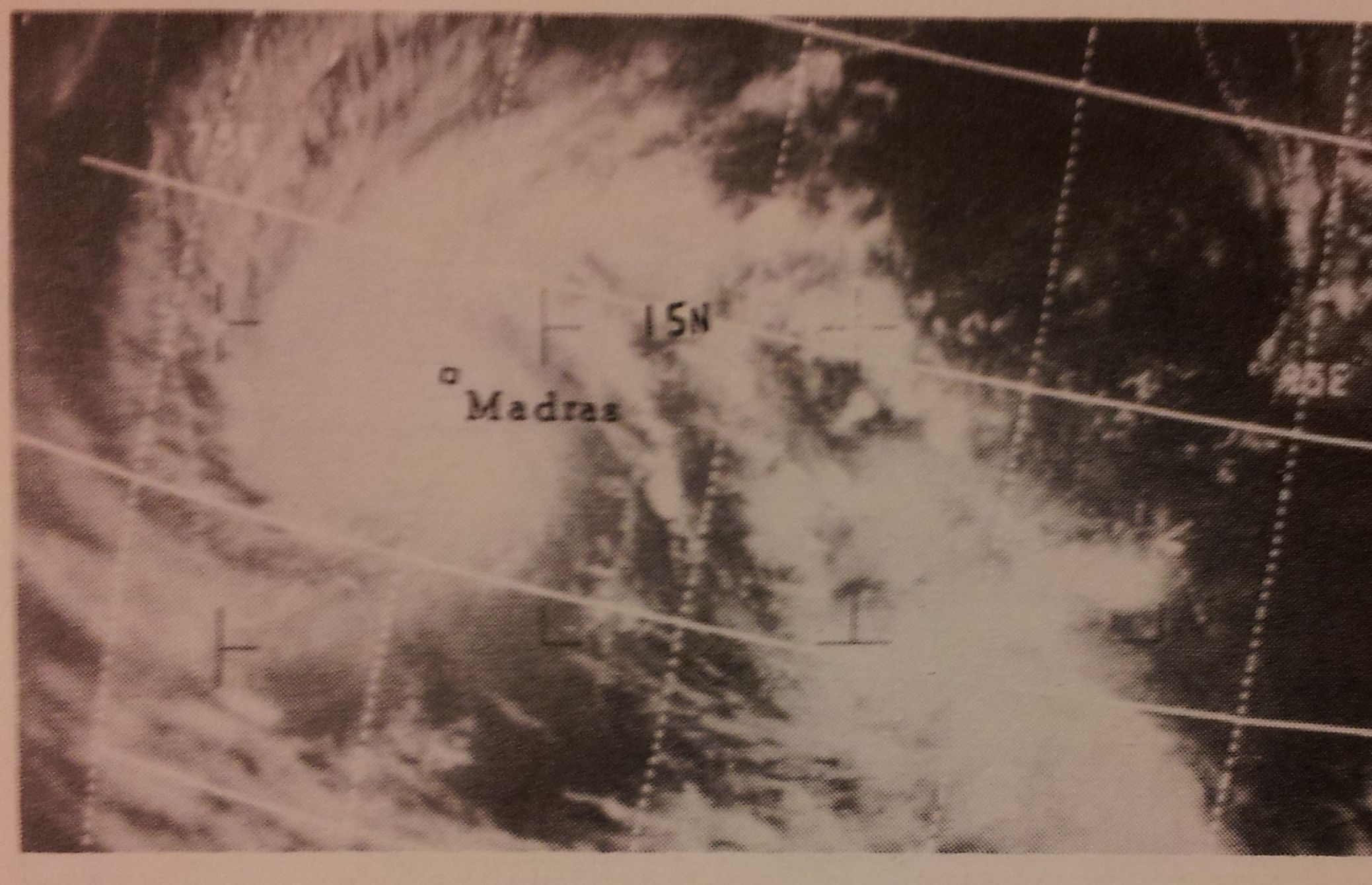
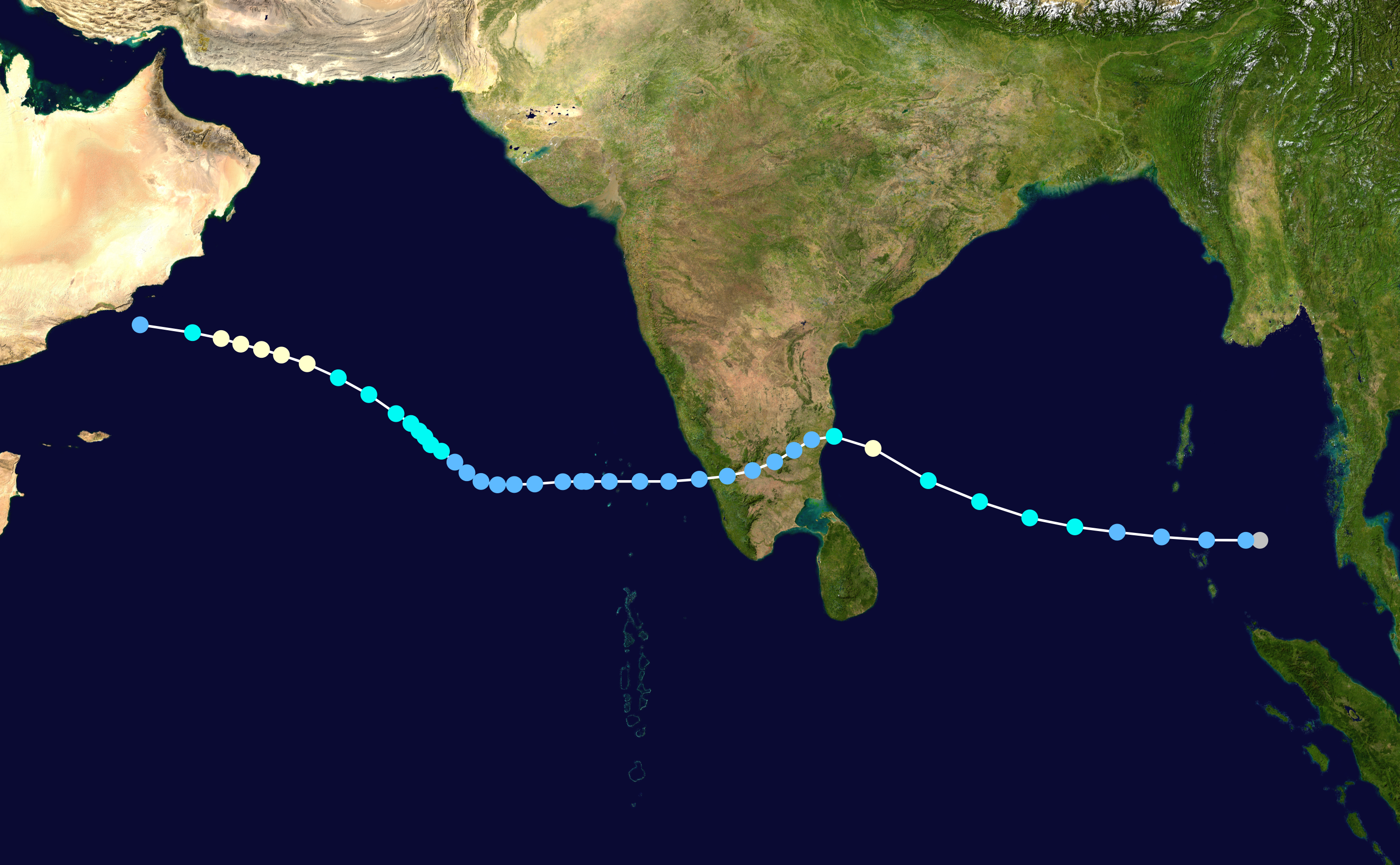
- Duration: October 31 – November 11
- Peak intensity: 120 km/h (75 mph) (1-min);

A cyclone struck Madras, India on November 3, killing over 50 people and leaving 800,000 people homeless.

=== Cyclone Fourteen (14B) ===
- Category 1 tropical cyclone (SSHWS)
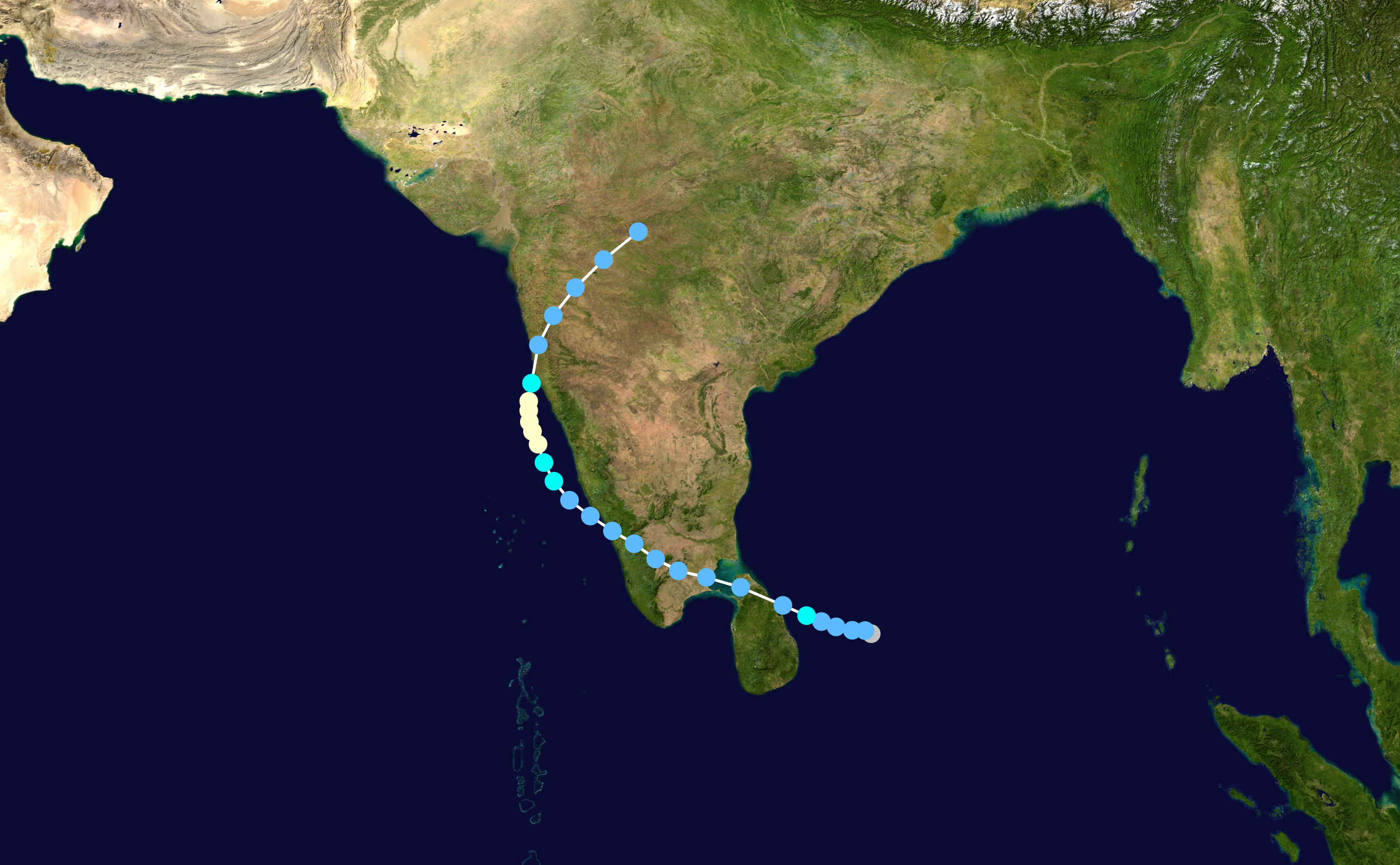
- Duration: November 7 – November 14
- Peak intensity: 120 km/h (75 mph) (1-min);

=== Cyclone Fifteen (15B) ===
- Category 1 tropical cyclone (SSHWS)
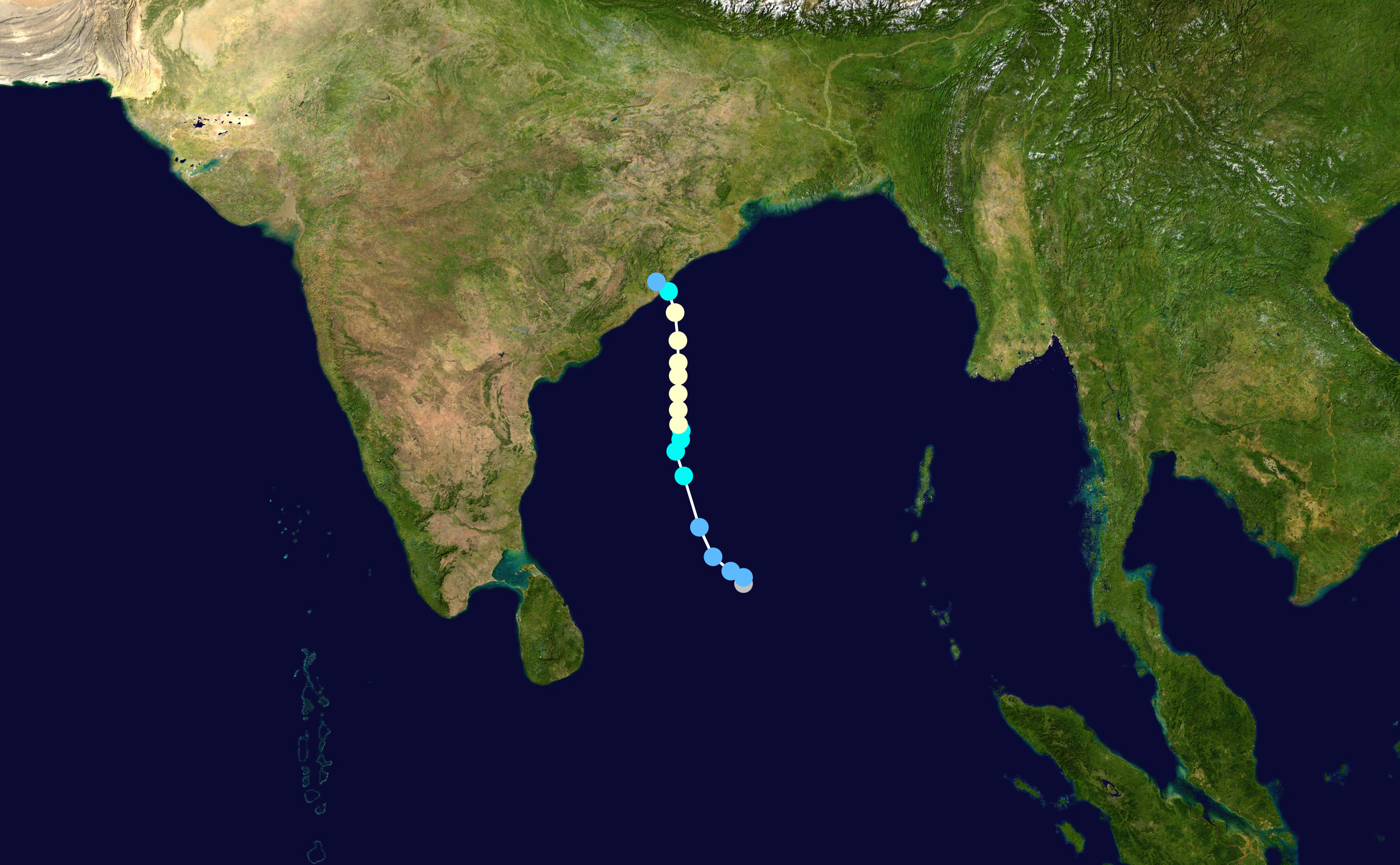
- Duration: November 17 – November 22
- Peak intensity: 120 km/h (75 mph) (1-min);

=== Cyclone Sixteen (16B) ===
- Category 1 tropical cyclone (SSHWS)
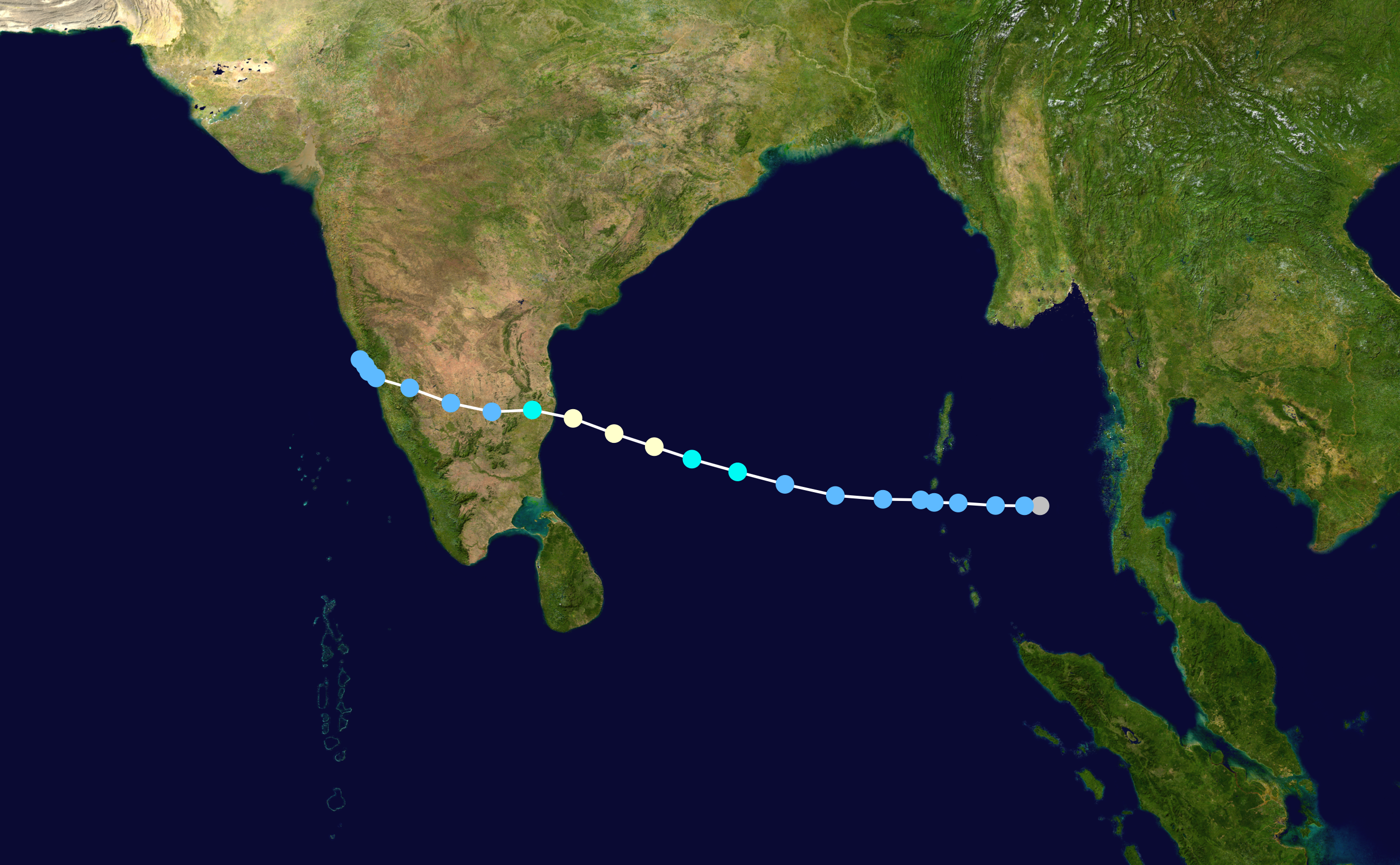
- Duration: November 24 – November 30
- Peak intensity: 120 km/h (75 mph) (1-min);

=== Tropical Storm Seventeen (17B) ===
- Tropical storm (SSHWS)
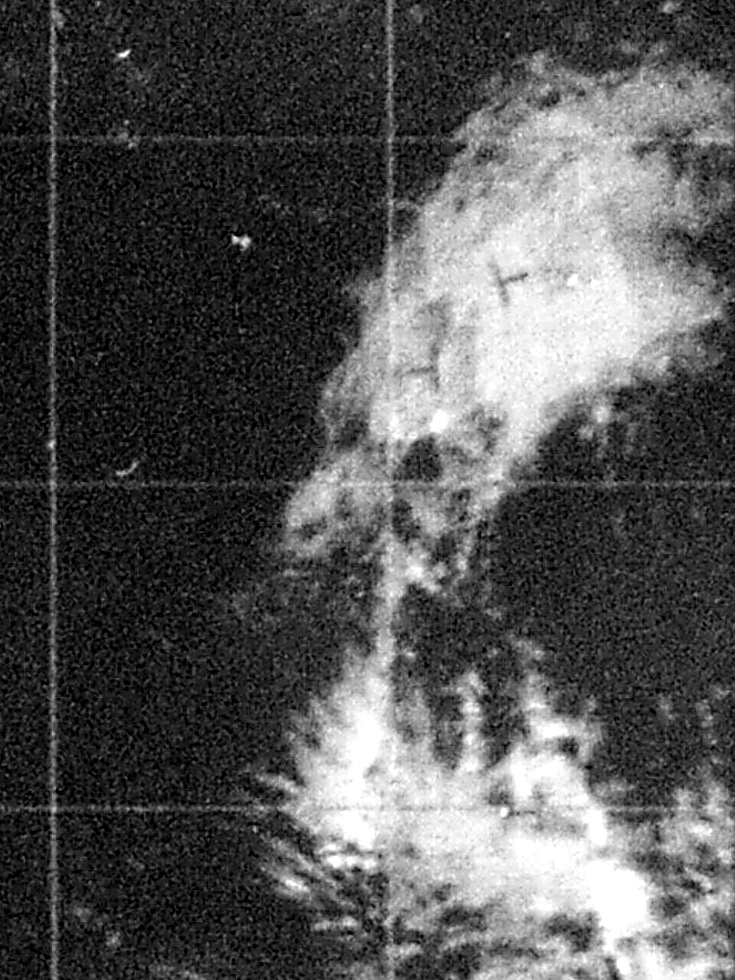
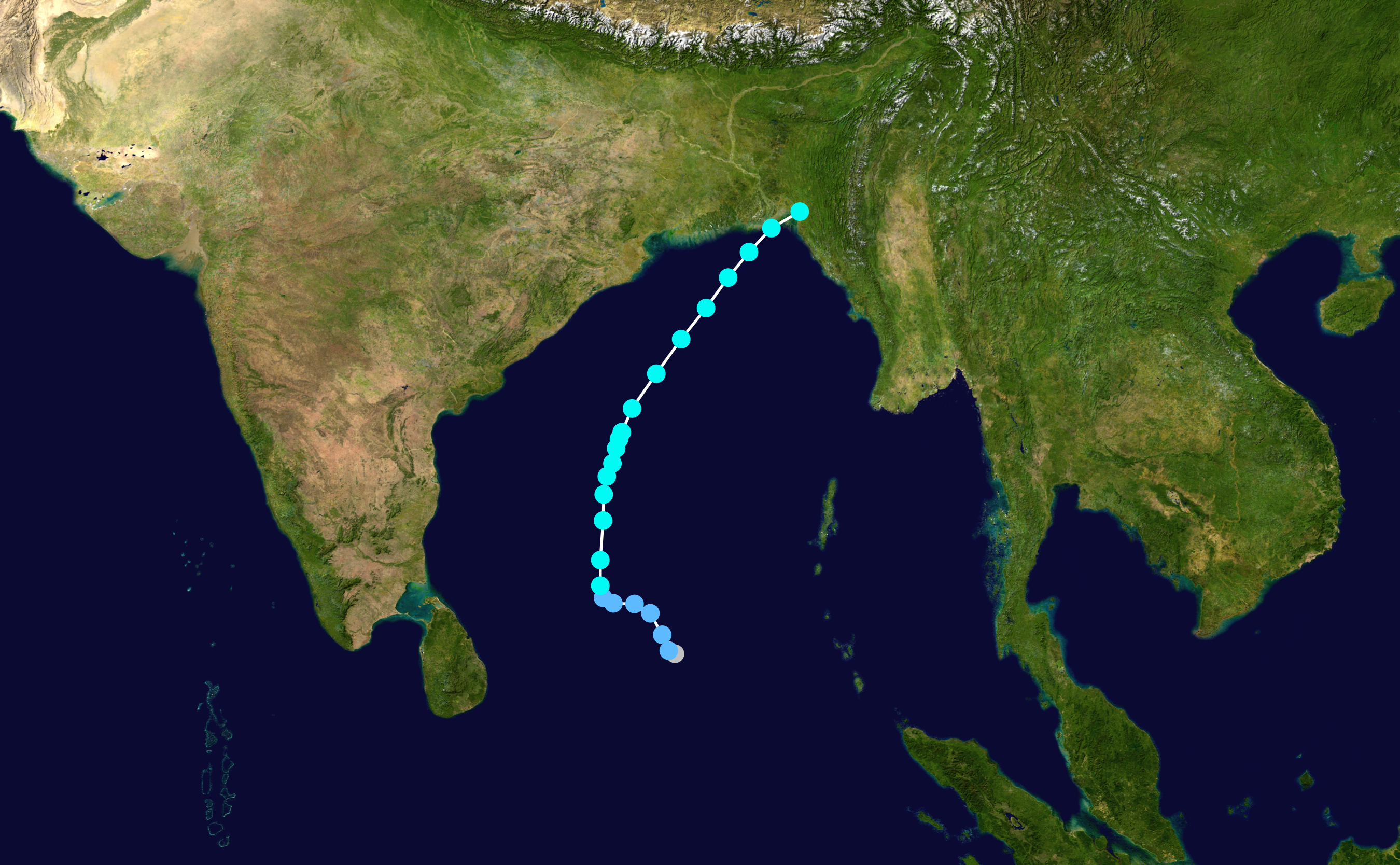
- Duration: December 7 – December 13
- Peak intensity: 65 km/h (40 mph) (1-min);

=== Tropical Depression Eighteen (18B) ===
- Tropical depression (SSHWS)
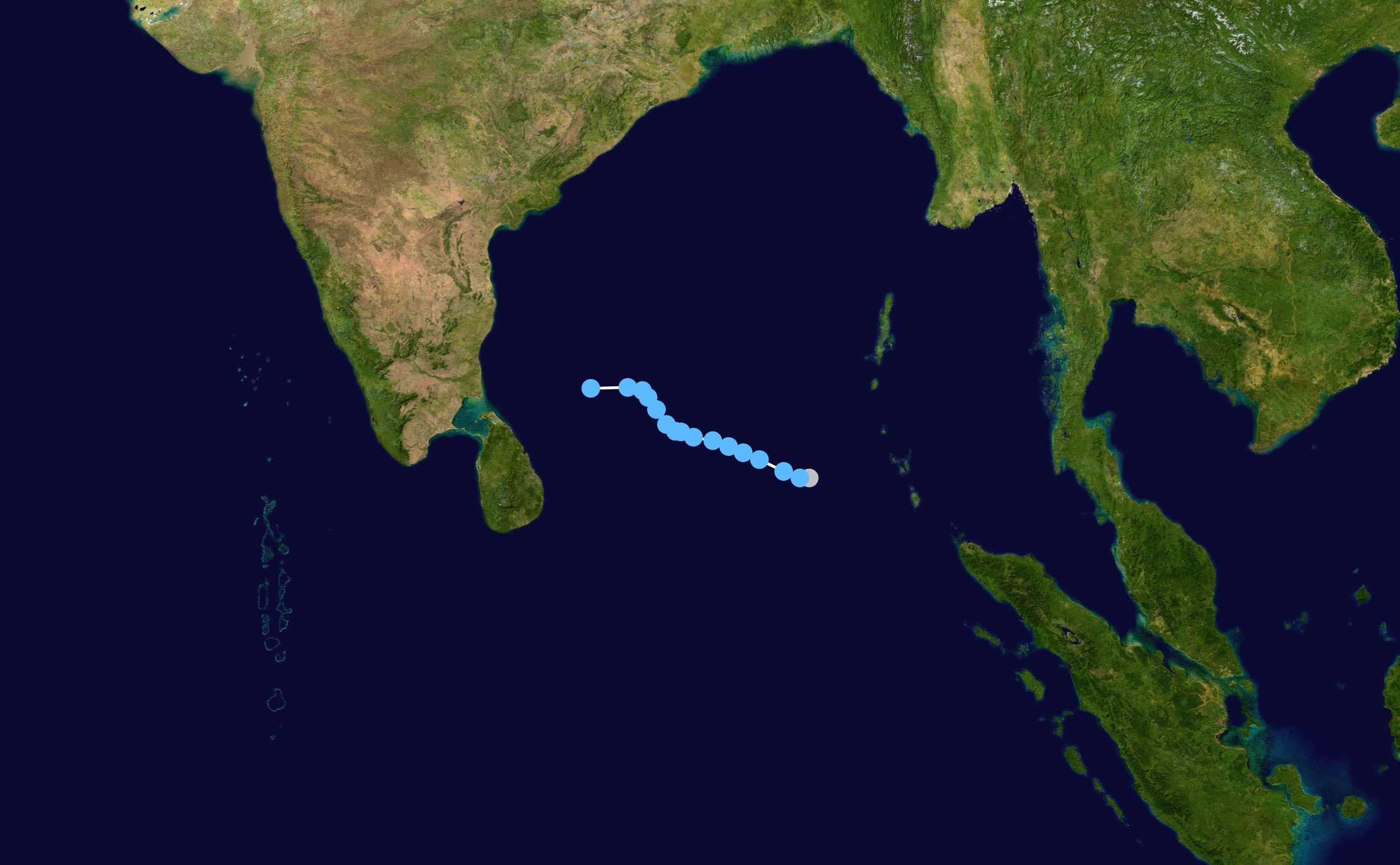
- Duration: December 15 – December 19
- Peak intensity: 45 km/h (30 mph) (1-min);

=== Cyclone Nineteen (19B) ===
- Category 1 tropical cyclone (SSHWS)
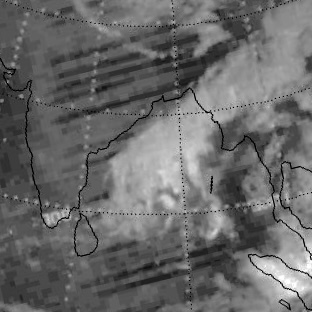
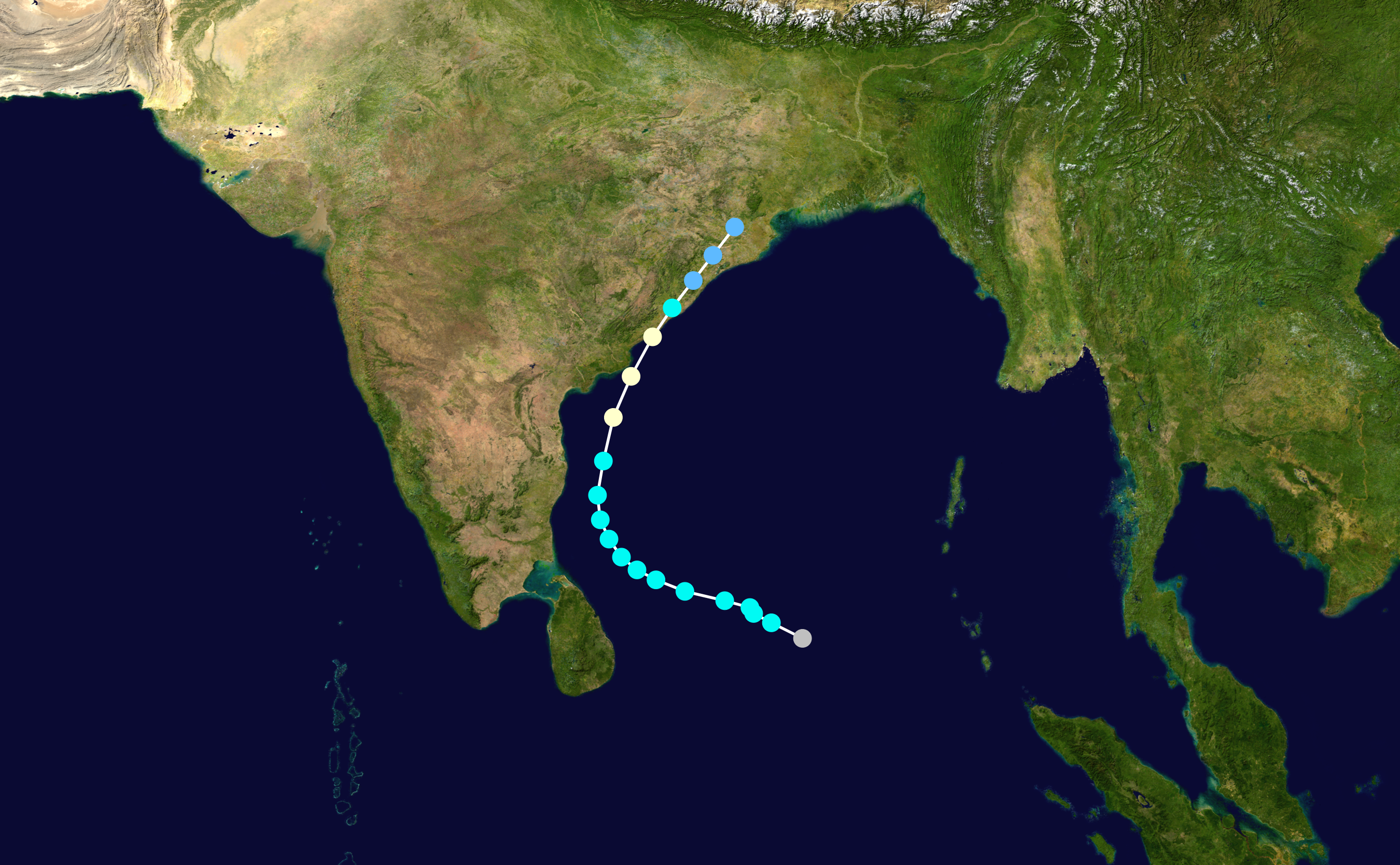
- Duration: December 30, 1966 – January 4, 1967
- Peak intensity: 120 km/h (75 mph) (1-min);

== See also ==
- North Indian Ocean tropical cyclone
- List of tropical cyclone records
- 1966 Atlantic hurricane season
- 1966 Pacific hurricane season
- 1966 Pacific typhoon season
- Australian region cyclone seasons: 1965–66 1966–67
- South Pacific cyclone seasons: 1965–66 1966–67
- South-West Indian Ocean cyclone seasons: 1965–66 1966–67
