= 1960s Australian region cyclone seasons =

Seasonal boundaries
- First system formed: 15 July 1960
- Last system dissipated: 4 May 1970

Seasonal statistics
- Total disturbances: 145
- Total fatalities: Unknown
- Total damage: Unknown

Related article
- 1960s South Pacific cyclone seasons

The following is a list of all reported tropical cyclones within the Australian region between 90°E and 160°E in the 1960s. During the decade, tropical cyclones were named by the New Caledonia Meteorological Service, while the Australian Bureau of Meteorology started to name them during the 1963–64 season.

== Systems ==
=== 1960–61 ===
- 15–21 July 1960 – A tropical cyclone existed over the Indian Ocean.
- 29–30 November 1960 – A tropical cyclone existed over the Indian Ocean.
- 15–24 December 1960 – A tropical cyclone existed over the Arafura Sea and moved towards north-western Australia.
- 29 December 1960 – 3 January 1961 – A tropical cyclone existed over the Indian Ocean.
- 2–6 January 1961 – A tropical cyclone existed over the Coral Sea and impacted the Cape York Peninsula.
- 7–14 January 1961 – Tropical Cyclone Barberine.
- 8–11 January 1961 – A tropical cyclone existed near the Cocos Islands.
- 15–27 January 1961 – A tropical cyclone existed over the Arafura Sea and moved towards north-western Australia.
- 26 January – 4 February 1961 – A tropical cyclone existed over the Coral Sea.
- 3–11 February 1961 – Tropical Cyclone Catherine.
- 8–13 February 1961 – A tropical cyclone existed over the Timor Sea and moved towards north-western Australia.
- 12–17 February 1961 – A tropical cyclone existed near the Cocos Islands.
- 20 February – 3 March 1961 – A tropical cyclone existed over the Timor Sea and moved towards the Indian Ocean.
- 20 February – 3 March 1961 – A tropical cyclone existed over the Arafura Sea and moved towards north-western Australia.
- 21 February – 2 March 1961 – A tropical cyclone existed near Christmas Island and the Cocos Islands.
- 2–8 March 1961 – A tropical cyclone moved across the Gulf of Carpentaria and the Cape York Peninsula, before impacting the Solomon Islands.
- 15–21 March 1961 - Tropical Cyclone Isis.

=== 1961–62 ===
- 29 November – 8 December 1961 – A tropical cyclone existed over the Solomon Sea and moved towards New Caledonia.
- 22–25 December 1961 – A tropical cyclone existed over the Coral Sea near Queensland, Australia.
- 7–14 January 1962 – A tropical cyclone impacted Western Australia and made landfall on the Kimberley.
- 20–31 January 1962 – A tropical cyclone existed off the coast of Northwestern Australia.
- 27 January – 12 February 1962 – A tropical cyclone existed in the Timor Sea and made landfall on the Kimberley before moving out into the Indian Ocean.
- 9–22 February 1962 – A tropical cyclone existed over the Kimberley, before moving out into the Indian Ocean.
- 16–19 February 1962 – A tropical cyclone existed over the Gulf of Carpentaria.
- 2–6 March 1962 – A tropical cyclone existed near the Cocos Islands.

=== 1962–63 ===
- 6–16 October 1962 – A tropical cyclone existed over the Indian Ocean and went on to impact Madagascar.
- 16–29 December 1962 – A tropical cyclone existed over the Indian Ocean.
- 24–27 December 1962 – A tropical cyclone existed over the Coral Sea to the east of Willis Island.
- 31 December 1962 – 1 January 1963 – A tropical cyclone impacted Double Island Point in Queensland.
- 1–11 January 1963 – A tropical cyclone existed over the Indian Ocean.
- 1 January 1963 – Tropical Cyclone Annie.
- 7–15 January 1963 – A tropical cyclone existed in the Timor Sea and moved towards north-western Australia.
- 9–17 January 1963 – A tropical cyclone existed over the Indian Ocean and went on to impact Madagascar.
- 13–14 January 1963 – A tropical cyclone existed over the Coral Sea.
- 19–30 January 1963 – A tropical cyclone existed in the Timor Sea and moved towards north-western Australia.
- 20–23 January 1963 – A tropical cyclone existed over the Coral Sea.
- 21–24 January 1963 – A tropical cyclone existed over the Indian Ocean.
- 25–27 January 1963 – A tropical cyclone existed over the Coral Sea.
- 29 January – 4 February 1963 – A tropical cyclone existed over the Indian Ocean.
- 29 January – 2 February 1963 – A tropical cyclone existed over the Coral Sea.
- 3–10 February 1963 – A tropical cyclone made landfall on Western Australia.
- 3–8 February 1963 – A tropical cyclone moved from Willis Island towards New Zealand.
- 12–17 February 1963 – A tropical cyclone existed over the Kimberley.
- 16–19 February 1963 – A tropical cyclone existed in the Timor Sea.
- 15–20 February 1963 – A tropical cyclone existed over the Coral Sea and moved towards New Zealand.
- 1–8 March 1963 – A tropical cyclone existed over the Coral Sea and impacted Vanuatu and New Caledonia.
- 14–16 March 1963 – A tropical cyclone impacted Southern Queensland.
- 22–25 March 1963 – A tropical cyclone impacted Townsville.
- 25–26 March 1963 – A tropical cyclone impacted the Gulf of Carpentaria.
- 26–30 March 1963 – A tropical cyclone moved from the Gulf of Carpentaria into central Queensland.
- 30 March – 6 April 1963 – A tropical cyclone moved from Queensland to the Kermaderic Islands.
- 10–14 April 1963 – A tropical cyclone existed over the Arnhem Land.
- 10–14 April 1963 – A tropical cyclone existed over the Arnhem Land.
- 20–26 April 1963 – A tropical cyclone existed over the Coral Sea, to the southeast of New Guinea.
- 2–9 May 1963 – A tropical cyclone existed over the Coral Sea and impacted Southern Queensland.
- 6–8 May 1963 – A tropical cyclone impacted Queensland and New South Wales.
- 7–8 May 1963 – A tropical cyclone impacted Queensland.
- 8–14 May 1963 – A tropical cyclone existed over the Coral Sea.
- 10–12 May 1963 – A tropical cyclone existed over the Coral Sea and impacted New Caledonia.
- 22–25 June 1963 – A tropical cyclone existed over the Coral Sea and impacted New Caledonia.
- 23 June – 4 July 1963 – A tropical cyclone impacted Queensland and New South Wales.
- 25–29 June 1963 – A tropical cyclone impacted Queensland and New South Wales.

=== 1963–64 ===
- 15–23 December 1963 – A tropical cyclone impacted the Solomon Islands.
- 4–11 January 1964 – Severe Tropical Cyclone Bessie.
- 11 January 1964 – Tropical Cyclone Audrey.
- 28 January – 9 February 1964 – Tropical Cyclone Dora.
- 27 January – 2 February 1964 – Tropical Cyclone Bertha.
- 2–9 February 1964 – Tropical Cyclone Dolly.
- 6–10 March 1964 – Tropical Cyclone Carmen.
- 24 March – 2 April 1964 – Tropical Cyclone Katie.
- 2–6 April 1964 – Tropical Cyclone Norma.
- 15–16 April 1964 – Tropical Cyclone Gertie.

=== 1964–65 ===
- 5–6 December 1964 – Tropical Cyclone Flora.
- 14 January 1965 – A tropical cyclone made landfall to the south of Thursday Island.
- 28–29 January 1965 – Tropical Cyclone Judy.
- 22 February – 1 March 1965 – Tropical Cyclone Marie.
- 25 February – 7 March 1965 – Tropical Cyclone Gay-Olive.
- 7–12 March 1965 – Tropical Cyclone Joan.
- 15–18 March 1965 – Tropical Cyclone Cynthia.
- 24 March – 4 April 1965 – Tropical Cyclone Ruth.

=== 1965–66 ===
- 25 December – 2 January 1965 – Tropical Cyclone Amanda.
- 16–19 January 1966 – Tropical Cyclone Joy.
- 5–10 February 1966 – Tropical Cyclone Lisa.
- 10–13 February 1966 – Tropical Cyclone Betty.
- 23 February – 2 March 1966 – Tropical Cyclone Connie.
- Dolly
- 22–24 March 1966 – Tropical Cyclone Sandra.
- 2 April 1966 – Tropical Cyclone Shirley.

=== 1966–67 ===
- 13–16 November 1966 – Tropical Cyclone Angela.
- 22–30 November 1966 – Tropical Cyclone Beryl.
- 2–5 December 1967 – A tropical cyclone existed near the Santa Cruz Islands.
- Tropical Cyclone Clara
- Tropical Cyclone Delilah
- Tropical Cyclone Edith
- 28–30 January 1967 – Tropical Cyclone Dinah.
- 18–22 February 1967 – Tropical Cyclone Barbara.
- 13–19 March 1967 – Tropical Cyclone Cynthia.
- 18 March 1967 – Tropical Cyclone Elaine.
- 16–19 March 1967 – Tropical Cyclone Glenda.

=== 1967–68 ===
- 10–16 November 1967 – Tropical Cyclone Annie.
- 6–10 December 1967 – A tropical cyclone existed off the east coast of Australia.
- 9–12 December 1967 – A tropical low existed off the east coast of Australia.
- 29 December 1967 – 9 January 1968 - Tropical Cyclone Elspeth.
- 30 December 1967 – 5 January 1968 – Tropical Cyclone Amy existed over the central Indian Ocean.
- 11–17 January 1968 – Tropical Cyclone Betsy.
- 14–24 January 1968 – Tropical Cyclone Brenda.
- 19–20 January 1968 – Tropical Cyclone Bertha.
- 19–24 January 1968 – Tropical Cyclone Doreen.
- 27–30 January 1968 – A possible tropical storm existed over the Coral Sea near Vanuatu.
- 28 January 1968 – Tropical Cyclone Dixie.
- 2–5 February 1968 – A tropical low existed in the Gulf of Carpentaria.
- 5–7 February 1968 – Tropical Cyclone Ella.
- 12–16 February 1968 – A tropical low existed in the Gulf of Carpentaria.
- 13–20 February 1968 – Tropical Cyclone Gina-Janine.
- 20–27 February 1968 – Tropical Cyclone Bonnie.
- 25–28 February 1968 – A tropical low existed off the east coast of Australia.
- 1–7 March 1968 – Tropical Cyclone Florence.
- 5–9 April 1968 – Tropical Cyclone Giselle.

=== 1968–69 ===
1968–69 Australian region cyclone season

- 23–29 November 1968 – Tropical Cyclone Adele.
- 11–15 December 1968 – Tropical Cyclone Becky.
- 16–23 December 1968 – Tropical Cyclone Amber.
- 19–25 December 1968 – Tropical Cyclone Beatie.
- 27–30 December 1968 – Tropical Cyclone Bettina.
- 27–30 December 1968 – Tropical Cyclone Cheri.
- 24–27 January 1969 – Tropical Cyclone Bridget.
- 28 January – 5 February 1969 – Tropical Cyclone Colleen.
- 4–15 February 1969 – Tropical Cyclone Enid-Fanny.
- 15–20 February 1969 – Tropical Cyclone Gladys.
- 21–24 February 1969 – Tropical Cyclone Irene.
- 26 February – 2 March 1969 – A possible tropical storm existed near the Solomon Islands.
- 1–5 March 1969 – Tropical Cyclone Audrey.
- April 1969 – Two tropical cyclones existed of the coast of Western Australia.
- 29 March – 7 April 1969 – Tropical Cyclone Leonie.
- 25 April – 4 May 1969 – Tropical Cyclone Esther.

=== 1969–70 ===
1969–70 Australian region cyclone season

- 8–9 November 1969 – Tropical Cyclone Blossom.
- 3–9 January 1970 – Tropical Cyclone Diane-Françoise.
- 3–19 January 1970 – Severe Tropical Cyclone Ada.
- 27 January – 6 February 1970 – Tropical Cyclone Glynis.
- 1–15 February 1970 – Tropical Cyclone Harriet-Iseult.
- 9–17 February – Tropical Cyclone Ingrid.
- 9–27 February – Tropical Cyclone Judy.
- 10–19 February – Tropical Cyclone Dawn.
- 10–12 February 1970 – Tropical Cyclone Florence.
- 11–21 March 1970 – Tropical Cyclone Cindy.
- 19 March – 25 March 1970 – Tropical Cyclone Kathy-Michelle.
- 14–19 April 1970 – Tropical Cyclone Isa.
- 4–9 May 1970 – Tropical Cyclone Lulu.

== See also ==
- Australian region tropical cyclone
- Atlantic hurricane seasons: 1960, 1961, 1962, 1963, 1964, 1965, 1966, 1967, 1968, 1969
- Eastern Pacific hurricane seasons: 1960, 1961, 1962, 1963, 1964, 1965, 1966, 1967, 1968, 1969
- Western Pacific typhoon seasons: 1960, 1961, 1962, 1963, 1964, 1965, 1966, 1967, 1968, 1969
- North Indian Ocean cyclone seasons: 1960, 1961, 1962, 1963, 1964, 1965, 1966, 1967, 1968, 1969
