= 1960s South Pacific cyclone seasons =

Seasonal boundaries
- First system formed: December 28, 1959
- Last system dissipated: May 4, 1969

Seasonal statistics
- Total disturbances: 120
- Total fatalities: 500+
- Total damage: Unknown

Related article
- 1960s Australian region cyclone seasons

The following is a list of all reported tropical cyclones within the South Pacific Ocean to the east of 160°E during the 1960s.

== Systems ==
=== 1959–60 ===
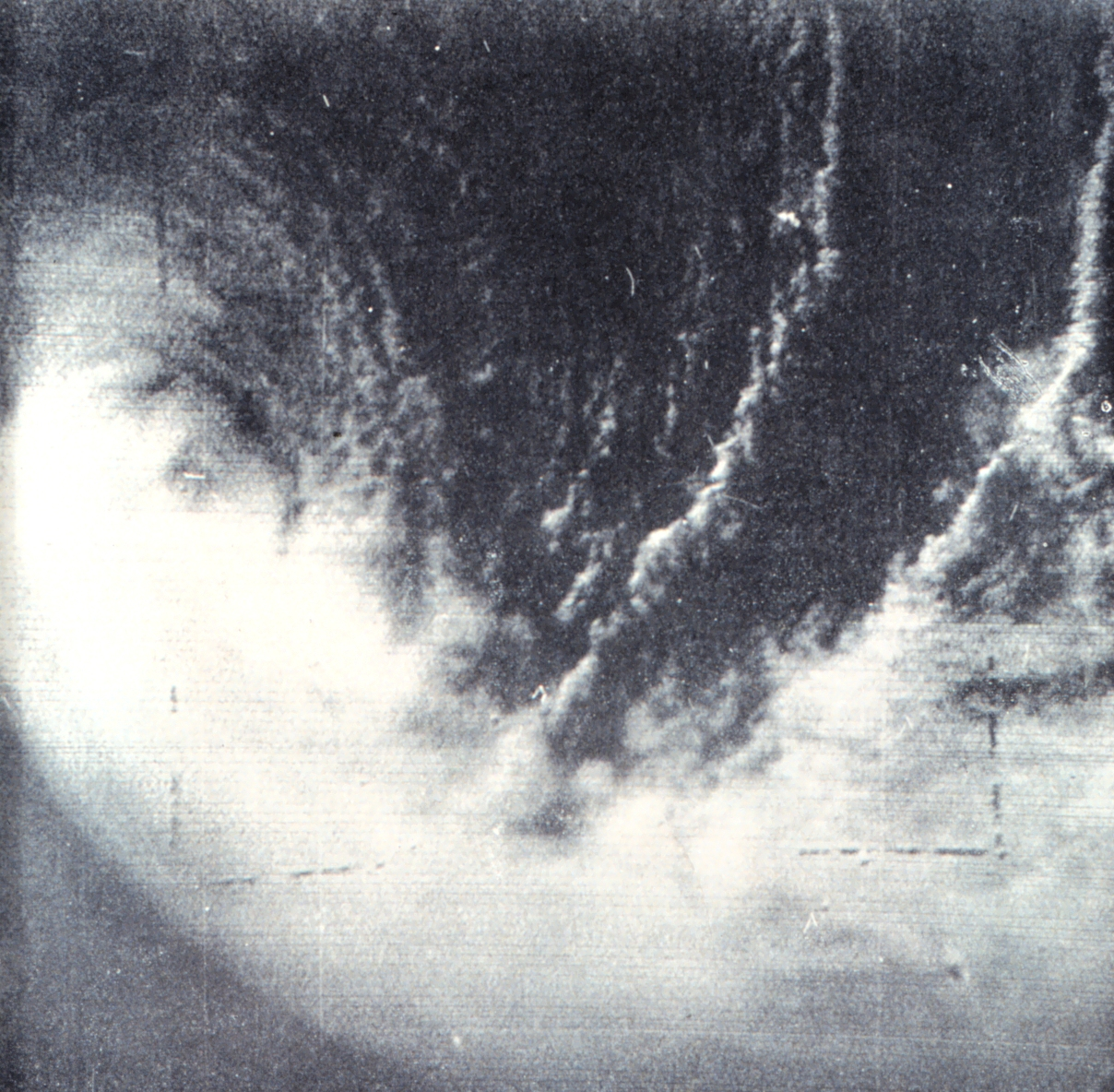
Satellite image taken of the April 10, 1960 cyclone.

- December 28, 1959 – January 4, 1960 – Tropical Cyclone Brigette.
- January 2–4, 1960 – A possible tropical cyclone named Delilah existed to the west of Fiji.
- January 15–20, 1960 – Tropical Cyclone Corine.
- January 17–19, 1960 – A tropical cyclone impacted northern and central Tonga.
- March 17–23, 1960 – Tropical Cyclone Flora.
- April 2–10, 1960 – Tropical Cyclone Gina.
- April 10, 1960 – An unnamed tropical cyclone was located north of New Zealand when it was captured by the TIROS-1 weather satellite, making it the first tropical cyclone with a photograph taken from a satellite.

=== 1960–61 ===
- January 9–14, 1961 – Tropical Cyclone Barberine existed near New Caledonia's Loyalty Islands, where it had a minor impact on the islands.
- February 3–11, 1961 – Tropical Cyclone Catherine.
- March 3–12, 1961 – A possible tropical cyclone impacted Tuvalu, Samoa and the Northern Cook Islands.
- March 12–19, 1961 – A tropical cyclone impacted the Northern Cook Islands and French Polynesia's Society Islands. It is thought that this system might have been two separate tropical cyclones rather than one.
- March 14–19, 1961 – A tropical cyclone impacted central and southern Tonga.
- March 15–21, 1961 – Tropical Cyclone Isis.

=== 1961–62 ===
- November 29 – December 8, 1961 – Tropical Cyclone Alizor developed about 435 km (270 mi) to the southwest of Honiara in the Solomon Islands. Over the next few days, the system moved south-eastwards and passed around 250 km (155 mi) to the west of Koumac in northern New Caledonia during December 2. The system subsequently continued to move south-eastwards and impacted Norfolk Island, before it was last noted during December 10, while located to the northwest of New Zealand. Alizor caused heavy rain, minor damage, river flooding and disrupted telephone communications in New Caledonia.
- February 8–13, 1962 – A tropical depression moved from Vanuatu to the south of Fiji and possibly became a tropical cyclone.
- February 13–17, 1962 – During February 13, a tropical cyclone formed to the northwest of Palmerston Island and moved eastwards towards Aitutaki, where gale-force winds were reported. The system subsequently moved southwards through the eastern Cook Islands, before it was last noted during February 17. Within the Cook Islands, the system possibly produced hurricane-force winds over the islands, where considerable damage to houses and citrus plantations was reported on Mauke and Atiu.
- February 14–17, 1962 – A tropical cyclone existed to the east of Vanuatu and moved south-eastwards without making landfall.
- February 18–19, 1962 – A tropical cyclone was located to the southwest of Palmerston Island in the Cook Islands.
- February 27 – March 2, 1962 – A tropical cyclone existed in between Vanuatu and New Caledonia's Loyalty Islands.

=== 1962–63 ===
- November 10–14, 1962 – A tropical cyclone existed near New Caledonia's Loyalty Islands and moved south-eastwards towards the Kermadic Islands.
- December 22–25, 1962 – A tropical cyclone existed to the south of Samoa and moved south-eastwards to the south of the Cook Islands where it caused gale-force winds on Palmerston Island.
- January 15–18, 1963 – A tropical cyclone moved through the islands of Vanuatu where it caused no significant damage.
- January 18–21, 1963 – A possible tropical cyclone moved from Vanuatu to the south of Fiji.
- January 29 – February 2, 1963 – A possible tropical cyclone existed in the Coral Sea to the north of New Caledonia.
- February 16–20, 1963 – A tropical cyclone moved south-westwards within the Coral Sea, however, it did not make landfall on any island nation.
- March 1–6, 1963 – A tropical cyclone existed within the Coral Sea and moved south-eastwards between Vanuatu and New Caledonia.
- March 7–18, 1963 – A tropical cyclone impacted Tonga, Niue and the Southern Cook Islands.
- April 1–6, 1963 – A tropical cyclone existed to the southeast of New Caledonia.
- April 20–26, 1963 – A tropical cyclone existed within the Coral Sea to the southeast of New Guinea.

=== 1963–64 ===
- November 15–25, 1963 – A tropical cyclone impacted Vanuatu.
- December 15–23, 1963 – A tropical cyclone was observed over the north-eastern Coral Sea, as it moved through the Santa Cruz Islands before it moved southeastwards to the west of Fiji.
- January 27 – February 2, 1964 – Tropical Cyclone Bertha.
- February 19–25, 1964 – Tropical Cyclone Edith.
- March 18–25, 1964 – One or two tropical cyclones existed to the east of Vanuatu and moved south-eastwards towards southern Fiji.
- March 20, 1964 – A possible tropical cyclone possibly moved south-eastwards from New Caledonia to the south of Fiji.
- March 28 – April 7, 1964 – Tropical Cyclone Henrietta.
- June 13, 1964 – A tropical cyclone impacted the Samoan Islands, where 250 people were killed.

=== 1964–65 ===
- November 19 – December 1, 1964 – During November 19, a tropical cyclone was identified near Rotuma, before a plane from the Royal New Zealand Air Force provided information on the system's position during the next day. Over the next few days, the system moved south-eastwards and passed near Fiji's Vanua Levu and northern Lau Islands, causing minor damage to houses and coconut trees. After impacting Fiji, the system appeared to perform a loop, before it moved eastwards between the Tongan islands of Tongatapu and Haʻapai. After moving south of Niue, the system turned south-eastwards, before it was last noted during December 1.
- December 5–8, 1964 – A small tropical cyclone developed to the northwest of Rotuma, before hurricane-force winds were reported on the island during December 5, as it passed just to the east of the Fijian dependency. Over the next few days, the system moved south-westwards and impacted the Lau Islands, before it dissipated near Tonga during December 8.
- December 18–22, 1964 – A tropical cyclone impacted Fiji.
- January 14–16, 1965 – A possible tropical cyclone moved from Vanuatu to the south of Fiji.
- February 4–12, 1965 – A tropical cyclone impacted Wallis and Futuna and Fiji.
- February 18–19, 1965 – A possible tropical cyclone named Lucile impacted Vanuatu.
- February 24–28, 1965 – A possible tropical cyclone named Olga existed to the east of New Caledonia.

=== 1965–66 ===
- January 26 – February 6, 1966 – A tropical cyclone developed to the north of Fiji and later impacted Wallis and Futuna, Samoa and the Southern Cook Islands.
- January 29–31, 1966 – A tropical cyclone caused gale-force winds on Palmerston Island and Aitutaki, as it moved through the Southern Cook Islands. The storm caused significant damage in Samoa, American Samoa, Wallis et Futuna, and Tokelau, including uprooting all of Samoa's banana trees, three-quarters of its breadfruit trees, and a fifth of its coconut trees.
- February 13, 1966 – A possible tropical cyclone was located to the east of Tokelau.
- February 23 – March 2, 1966 – Tropical Cyclone Connie was located within the north-eastern Coral Sea and moved westwards, before it recurved south-eastwards to pass to the west of New Caledonia.
- March 12–16, 1966 – A tropical cyclone moved southeastwards between Vanuatu and New Caledonia.
- April 26–28, 1966 – A possible tropical cyclone existed to the west of French Polynesia's Society Islands and south of the Austral Islands.

=== 1966–67 ===
- November 13–19, 1966 – Tropical Cyclone Angela impacted the Solomon Islands.
- December 4–9, 1966 – A tropical cyclone moved south-eastwards over Viti Levu and the Lau Islands, where it caused some damage to banana trees and bures.
- January 23–31, 1967 – Tropical Cyclone Dinah developed near the Solomon Islands, before it moved south-westwards into the Australian region.
- February 1–8, 1967 – Tropical Cyclone Agnes developed to the east of northern Vanuatu and moved southeastwards between the island nation and New Caledonia.
- February 18–22, 1967 – Tropical Cyclone Barbara.
- February 23–27, 1967 – A possible tropical cyclone moved from Vanuatu to the south of Fiji.
- March 16–17, 1967 – Tropical Cyclone Glenda.
- April 7–14, 1967 – During April 7, a tropical cyclone developed to the northeast of Rotuma and moved southwards where it made landfall on Vanua Levu during April 9. Over the next couple of days, the system moved south-southeastwards to the east of Suva, near the island of Matuku and to the west of Ono-I-Lau. Severe damage was reported.

=== 1967–68 ===
- November 10–16, 1967 – Tropical Cyclone Annie.
- December 12–20, 1967 – A tropical cyclone impacted Tokelau and the Cook Islands.
- January 14–24, 1968 – Tropical Cyclone Brenda.
- January 27–30, 1968 – A possible tropical cyclone developed within the Coral Sea and moved eastwards through Vanuatu.
- February 7–13, 1968 – A tropical cyclone impacted Samoa and Niue.
- February 20–24, 1968 – A tropical cyclone developed to the southeast of New Caledonia and moved southwards towards Norfolk Island.
- March 1–5, 1968 – Tropical Cyclone Florence.
- March 20–25, 1968 – A tropical cyclone existed to the south of Fiji.
- April 5–10, 1968 – Tropical Cyclone Giselle.

=== 1968–69 ===
- November 29–30, 1968 – A possible tropical cyclone between Niue and the Southern Cook Islands.
- December 11–15, 1968 – Tropical Cyclone Becky.
- January 11–17, 1969 – A tropical cyclone impacted Wallis and Futuna before impacting Tonga.
- January 28 – February 5, 1969 – Tropical Cyclone Colleen.
- February 12–16, 1969 – Tropical Cyclone Hortense.
- February 17–21, 1969 – Tropical Cyclone Irene.
- February 25–28, 1969 – A tropical cyclone developed to the north of Fiji and moved south-eastwards towards Tonga.
- February 26 – March 2, 1969 – A possible tropical cyclone near the Solomon Islands to the east of Vanuatu.
- April 26 – May 4, 1969 – Tropical Cyclone Esther.

=== 1969–70 ===
- January 2–19, 1970 – Severe Tropical Cyclone Ada's precursor tropical depression performed a large clockwise loop, near the Solomon Islands before it ultimately made landfall on Queensland, Australia.
- January 9, 1970 – An area of low pressure with three weak centres, existed between Fiji, Rotuma and Samoa. Two of these centres developed further and brought gale-force winds to Tokelau, Samoa and Tuvalu.
- January 11–12, 1970 – A tropical depression brought gale-force winds to both Fiji and Tonga.
- February 10–19, 1970 – Tropical Cyclone Dawn.
- February 11–23, 1970 – Tropical Cyclone Dolly.
- February 28 – March 2, 1970 – Tropical Cyclone Emma.
- April 2–4, 1970 – Tropical Cyclone Fanny impacted Vanuatu and New Caledonia.
- April 8–10, 1970 – Tropical Cyclone Gillian.
- April 12–18, 1970 – Tropical Cyclone Helen.
- April 13–19, 1970 – Tropical Cyclone Isa.

== See also ==
- South Pacific tropical cyclone
- Atlantic hurricane seasons: 1960, 1961, 1962, 1963, 1964, 1965, 1966, 1967, 1968, 1969
- Eastern Pacific hurricane seasons: 1960, 1961, 1962, 1963, 1964, 1965, 1966, 1967, 1968, 1969
- Western Pacific typhoon seasons: 1960, 1961, 1962, 1963, 1964, 1965, 1966, 1967, 1968, 1969
- North Indian Ocean cyclone seasons: 1960, 1961, 1962, 1963, 1964, 1965, 1966, 1967, 1968, 1969
