= 1964 North Indian Ocean cyclone season =

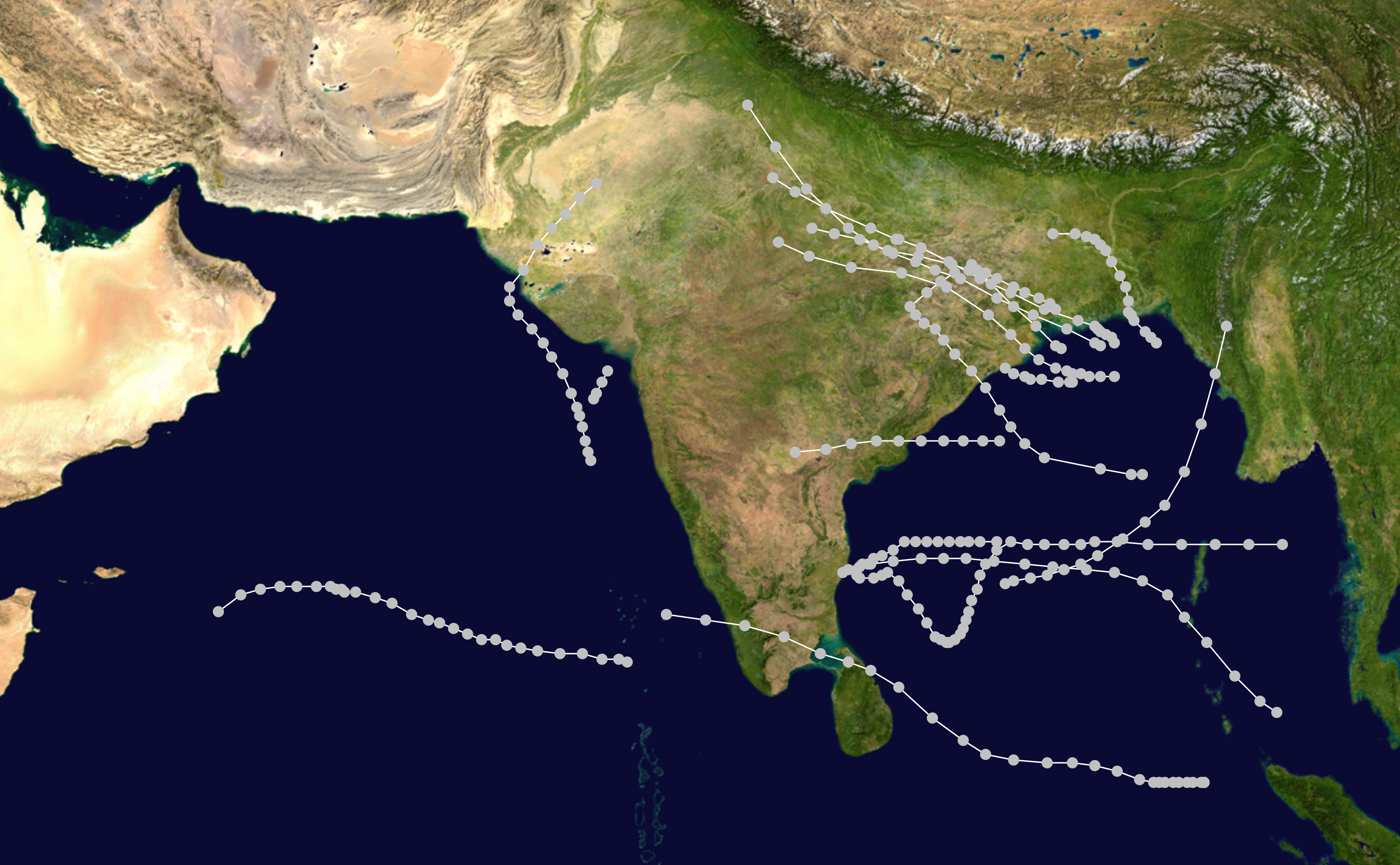
- Season summary map

Seasonal boundaries
- First system formed: May 6, 1964
- Last system dissipated: December 24, 1964

Strongest storm
- Name: Sixteen
  - Maximum winds: 240 km/h (150 mph)
  - Lowest pressure: 970 hPa (mbar)

Seasonal statistics
- Depressions: 16
- Deep depressions: 14
- Cyclonic storms: 7
- Very severe cyclonic storms: 3
- Total fatalities: At least 2,977
- Total damage: $150 million (1964 USD)

Related articles
- 1964 Atlantic hurricane season; 1964 Pacific hurricane season; 1964 Pacific typhoon season

The 1964 North Indian Ocean cyclone season was a highly above average season becoming the most active since 1936. It one of the most active seasons for the time until the record was surpassed by 1975. It had no bounds, but cyclones tend to form between April and December, with peaks in May and November. The season has no official bounds but cyclones tend to form between April and December. These dates conventionally delimit the period of each year when most tropical cyclones form in the northern Indian Ocean. There are two main seas in the North Indian Ocean—the Bay of Bengal to the east of the Indian subcontinent and the Arabian Sea to the west of India. The official Regional Specialized Meteorological Centre in this basin is the India Meteorological Department (IMD), while the Joint Typhoon Warning Center releases unofficial advisories. An average of four to six storms form in the North Indian Ocean every season with peaks in May and November. Cyclones occurring between the meridians 45°E and 100°E are included in the season by the IMD.

== Systems ==
=== Cyclonic Storm One ===
- Cyclonic storm (IMD)
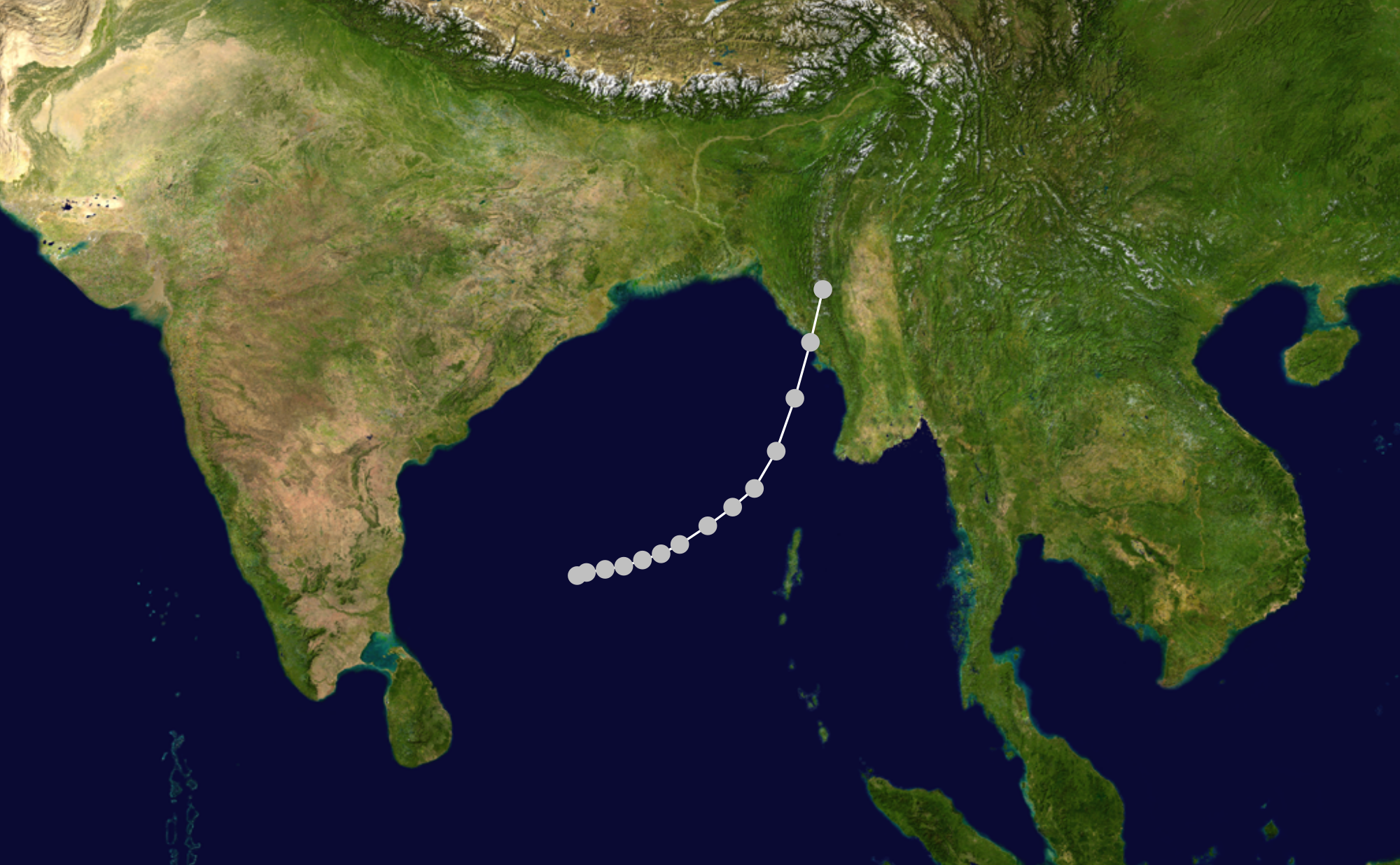
- Duration: May 6 – May 9
- Peak intensity: 75 km/h (45 mph) (3-min); 992 hPa (mbar)

Cyclonic Storm One developed in the Bay of Bengal on May 6. It moved east-northeastward and eventually curved northeastward. The system made landfall in Burma before dissipating on May 9.

=== Very Severe Cyclonic Storm Two ===
- Very severe cyclonic storm (IMD)
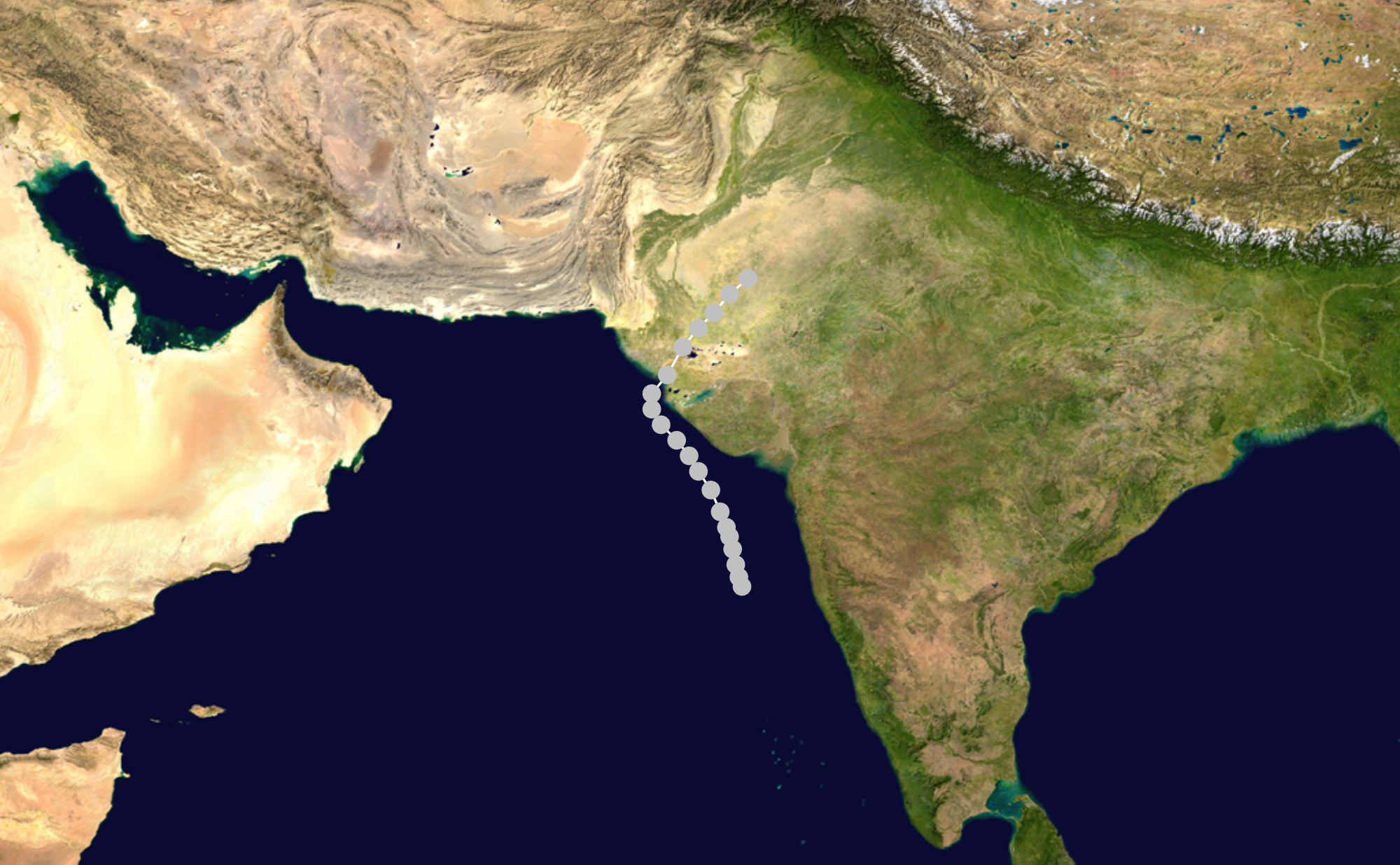
- Duration: June 9 – June 13
- Peak intensity: 140 km/h (85 mph) (3-min); 969 hPa (mbar)

Under the influence of the ongoing onset of the southwest monsoon, a trough of low pressure developed over the Arabian Sea off the coast of Karnataka on June 6. It slowly moved northwards, and consolidated into a depression by the morning of June 9. The next morning, while the storm was moving northwestwards, the India Meteorological Department upgraded it to a Cyclonic Storm. Over the following days the storm intensified further into a very severe cyclonic storm, recurved northeastwards and crossed the coast of Gujarat near Naliya at a peak intensity of 969 hPa (28.61 inHg). The system rapidly degenerated inland and dissipated into a low-pressure area on June 13. 27 deaths were reported due to the cyclone in India. Prolonged rains associated with the system triggered severe flooding in Pakistan that killed 450 people. Approximately 400,000 were affected by the floods and damage amounted to $4.1 million.

=== Deep Depression Three ===
- Deep depression (IMD)
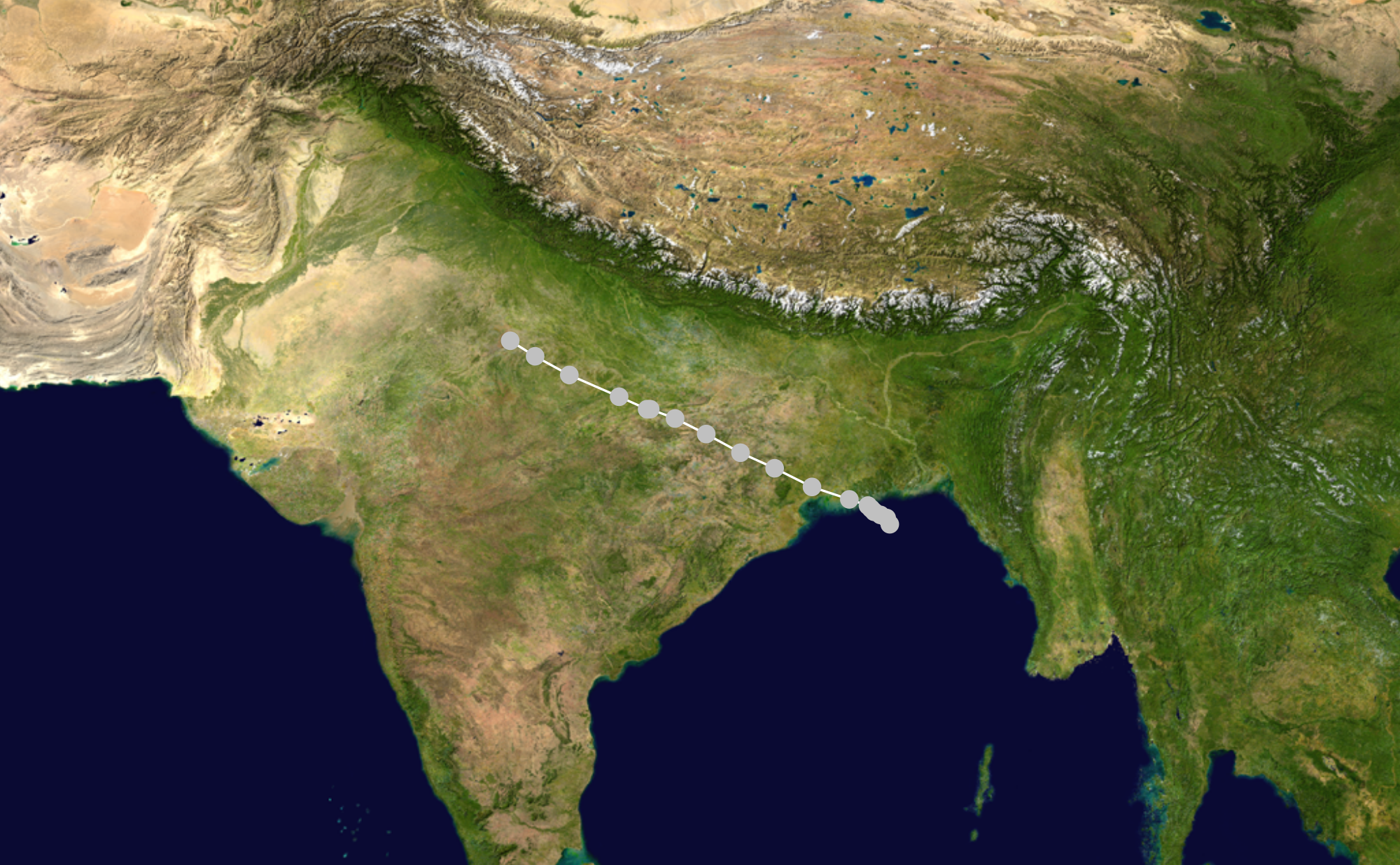
- Duration: July 3 – July 6
- Peak intensity: 55 km/h (35 mph) (3-min); 987 hPa (mbar)

A deep depression developed in the northern Bay of Bengal on July 3. It headed northwestward and soon struck the state of West Bengal in India. The storm persisted for a few days inland, before dissipating on July 6.

=== Deep Depression Four ===
- Deep depression (IMD)
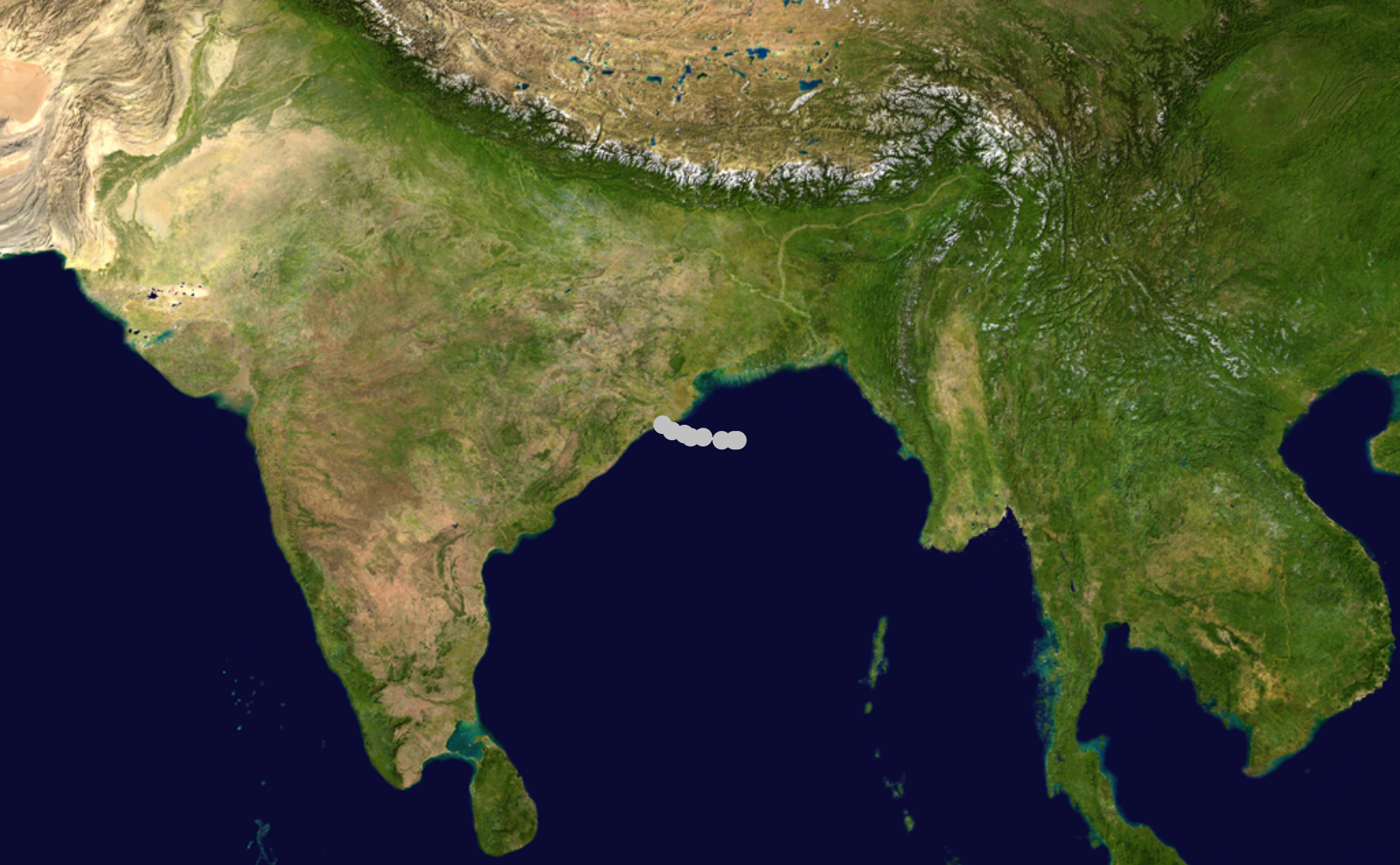
- Duration: August 5 – August 6
- Peak intensity: 65 km/h (40 mph) (3-min); 990 hPa (mbar)

Deep Depression Four developed in the northern Bay of Bengal on August 5. It moved westward and struck India before dissipating on August 6.

=== Cyclonic Storm Five ===
- Cyclonic storm (IMD)
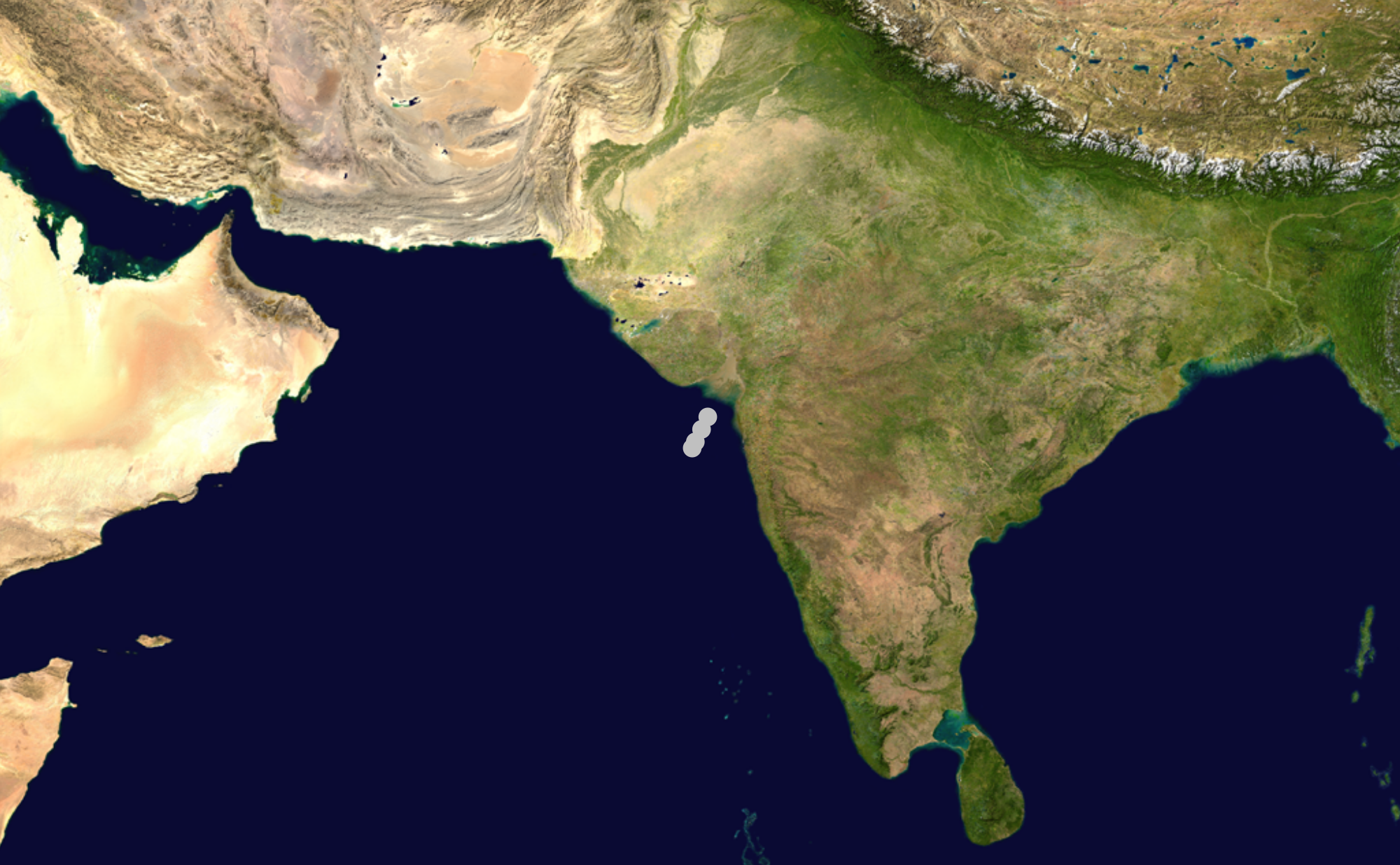
- Duration: August 6 – August 7
- Peak intensity: 75 km/h (45 mph) (3-min); 987 hPa (mbar)

Cyclonic Storm Five briefly existed in the Arabian Sea. It formed as a depression on 7 August near the coast of North Maharashtra and moved north-northeast. It intensified in the cyclonic storm for a while and moved northwest before turning into low pressure area near the South Gujarat coast the same day.

=== Deep Depression Six ===
- Deep depression (IMD)
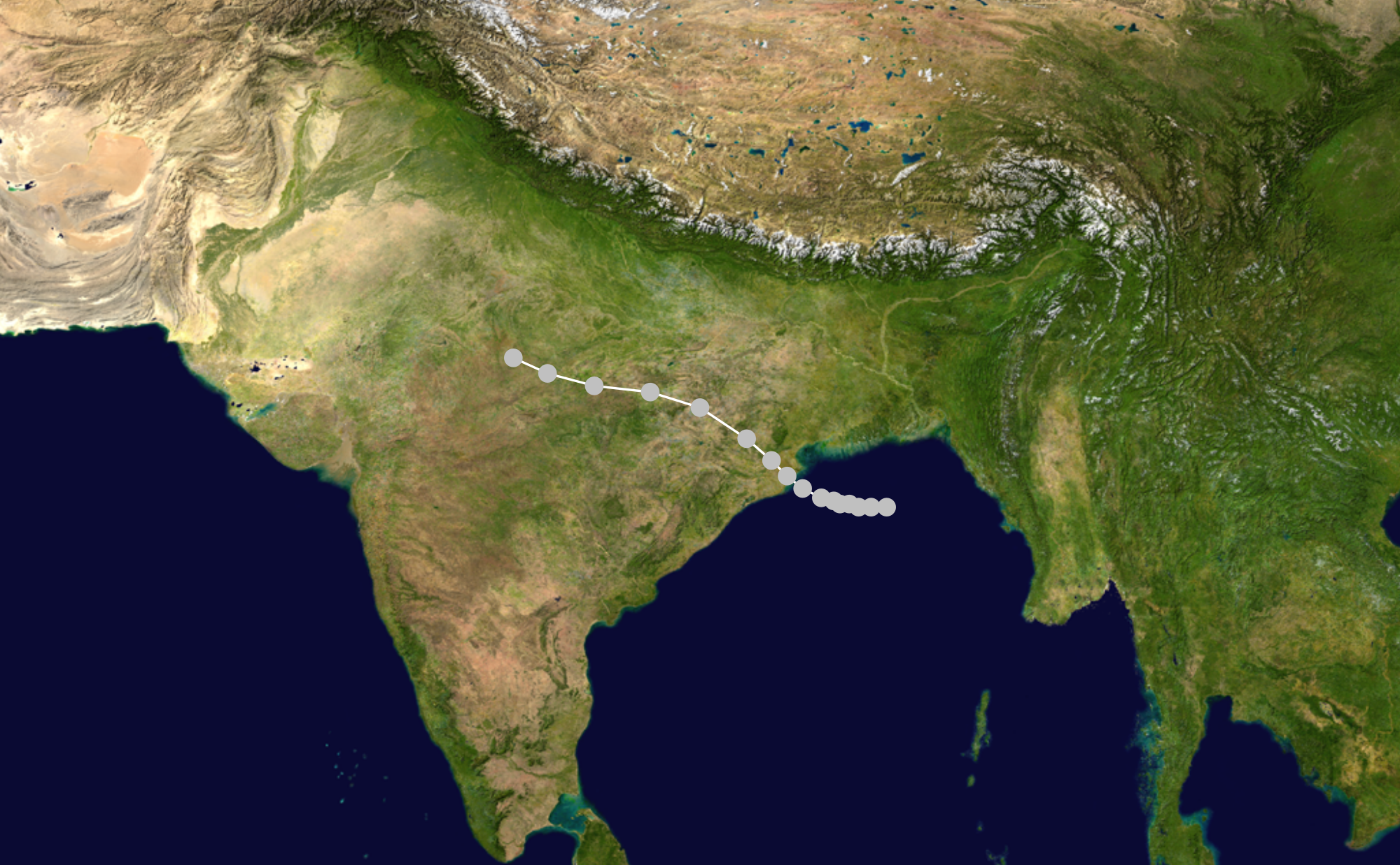
- Duration: August 10 – August 12
- Peak intensity: 45 km/h (30 mph) (3-min); 987 hPa (mbar)

Deep Depression Six developed in the northern Bay of Bengal on August 10. It later struck eastern India. The deep depression dissipated by August 12.

=== Depression Seven ===
- Depression (IMD)
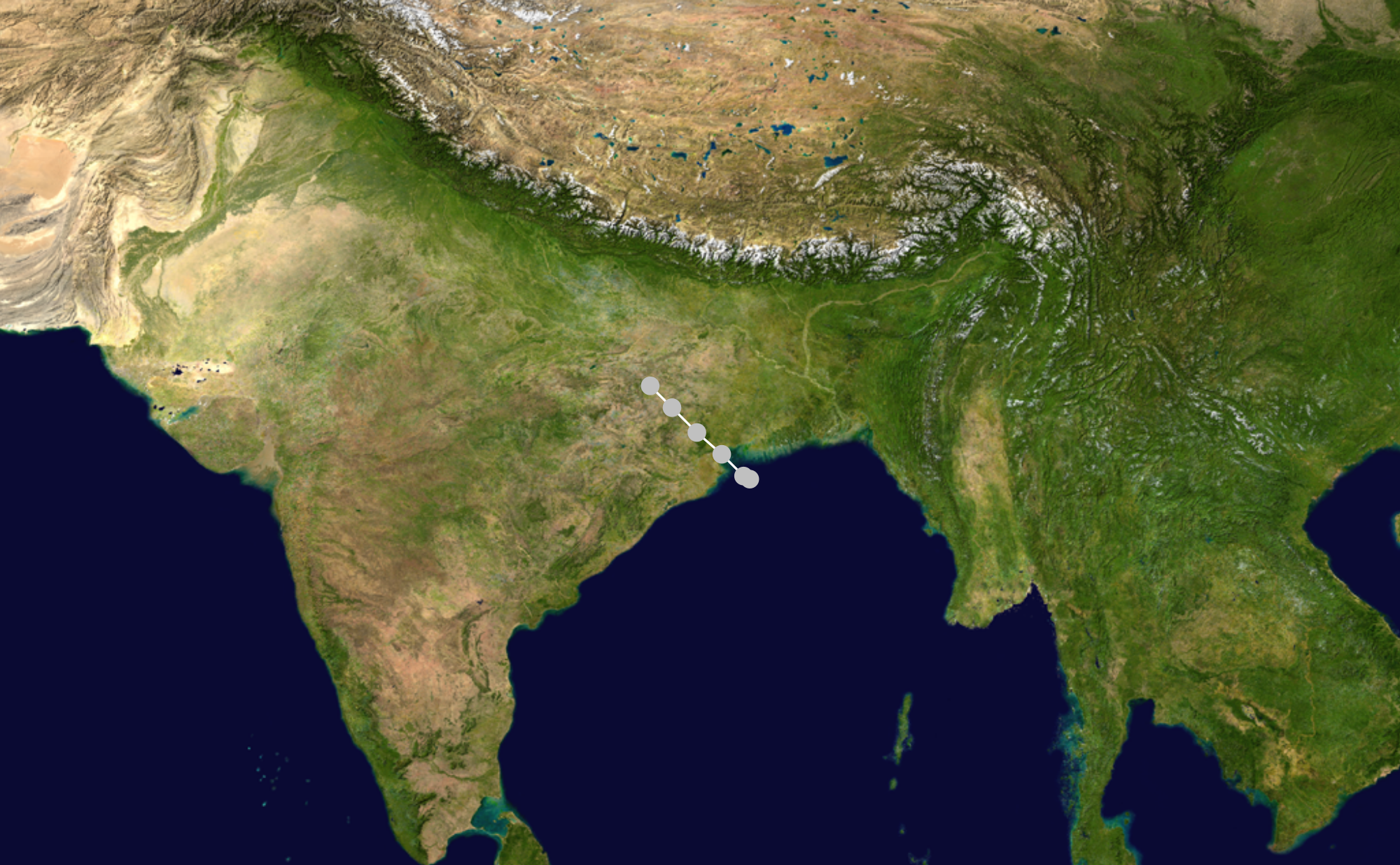
- Duration: August 15 – August 16
- Peak intensity: 55 km/h (35 mph) (3-min); 995 hPa (mbar)

Depression Seven developed in the Bay of Bengal on August 15 and soon made landfall in India. The depression dissipated on the following day.

=== Land Depression Eight ===
- Depression (IMD)
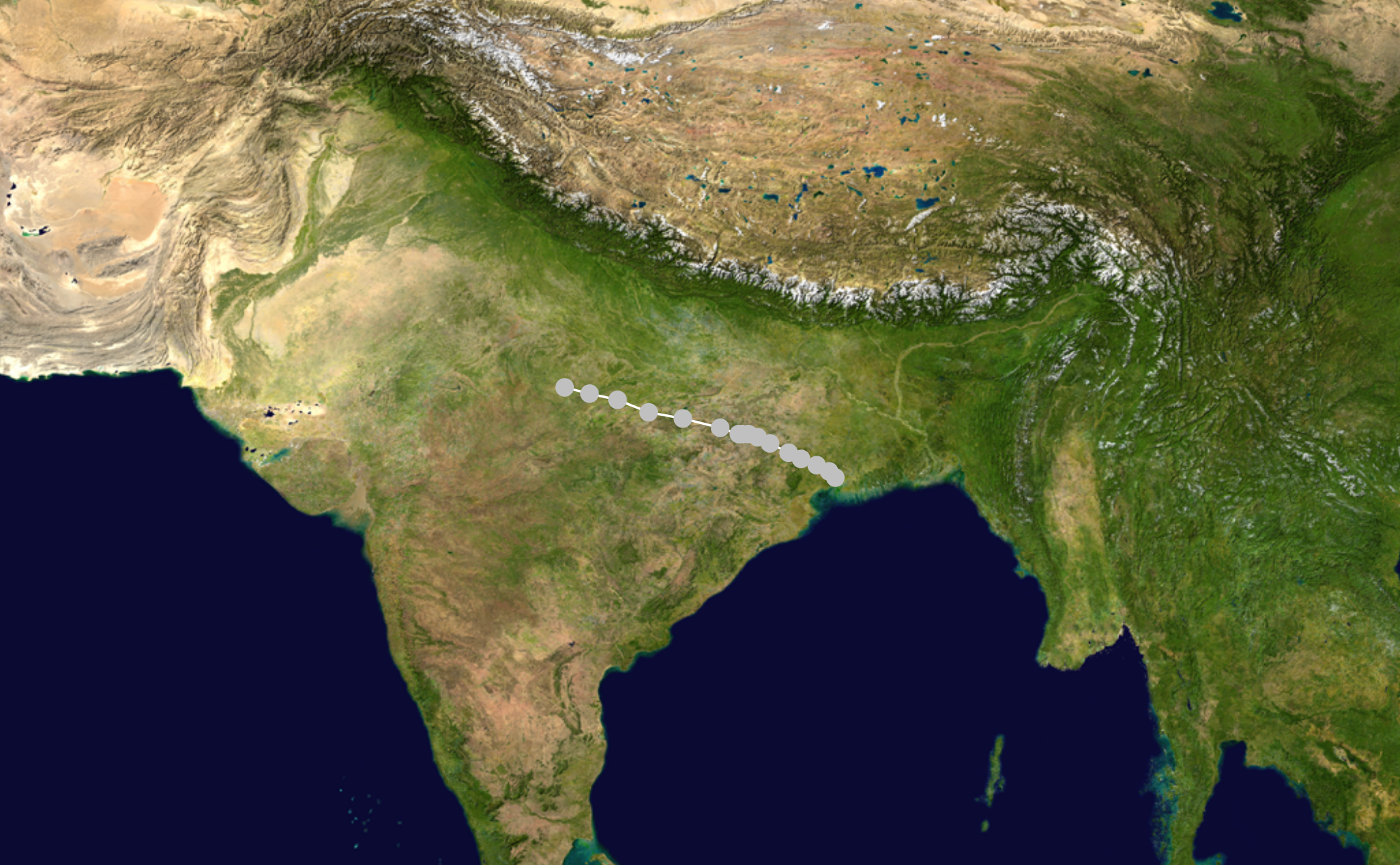
- Duration: August 23 – August 26
- Peak intensity: Winds not specified;

A land depression existed over India from August 23 to August 26.

=== Deep Depression Nine ===
- Deep depression (IMD)
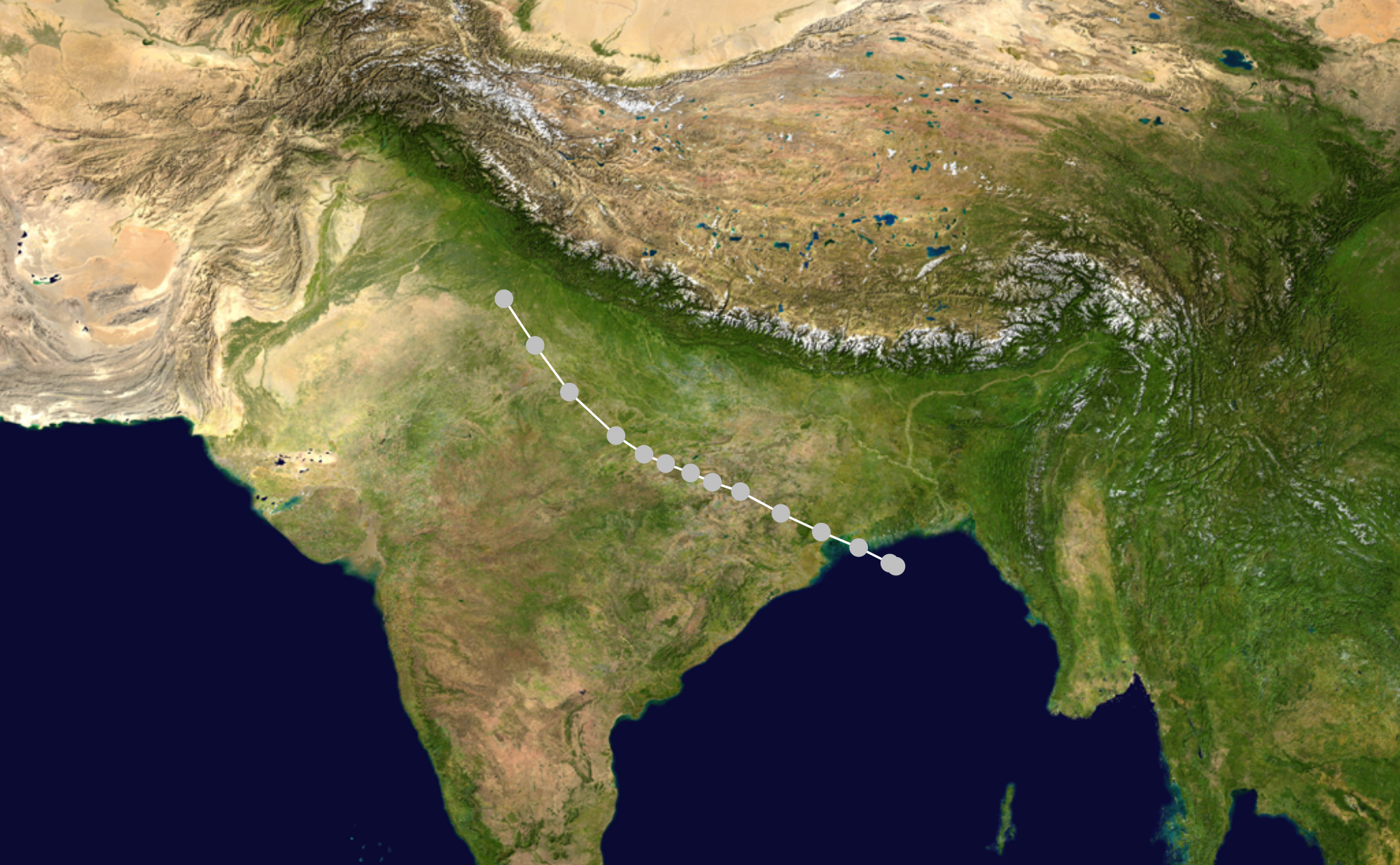
- Duration: September 23 – September 25
- Peak intensity: 65 km/h (40 mph) (3-min); 991 hPa (mbar)

Deep Depression Nine developed in the Bay of Bengal on September 23. It almost immediately moved inland over West Bengal. The deep depression persisted until September 25.

=== Deep Depression Ten ===
- Deep depression (IMD)
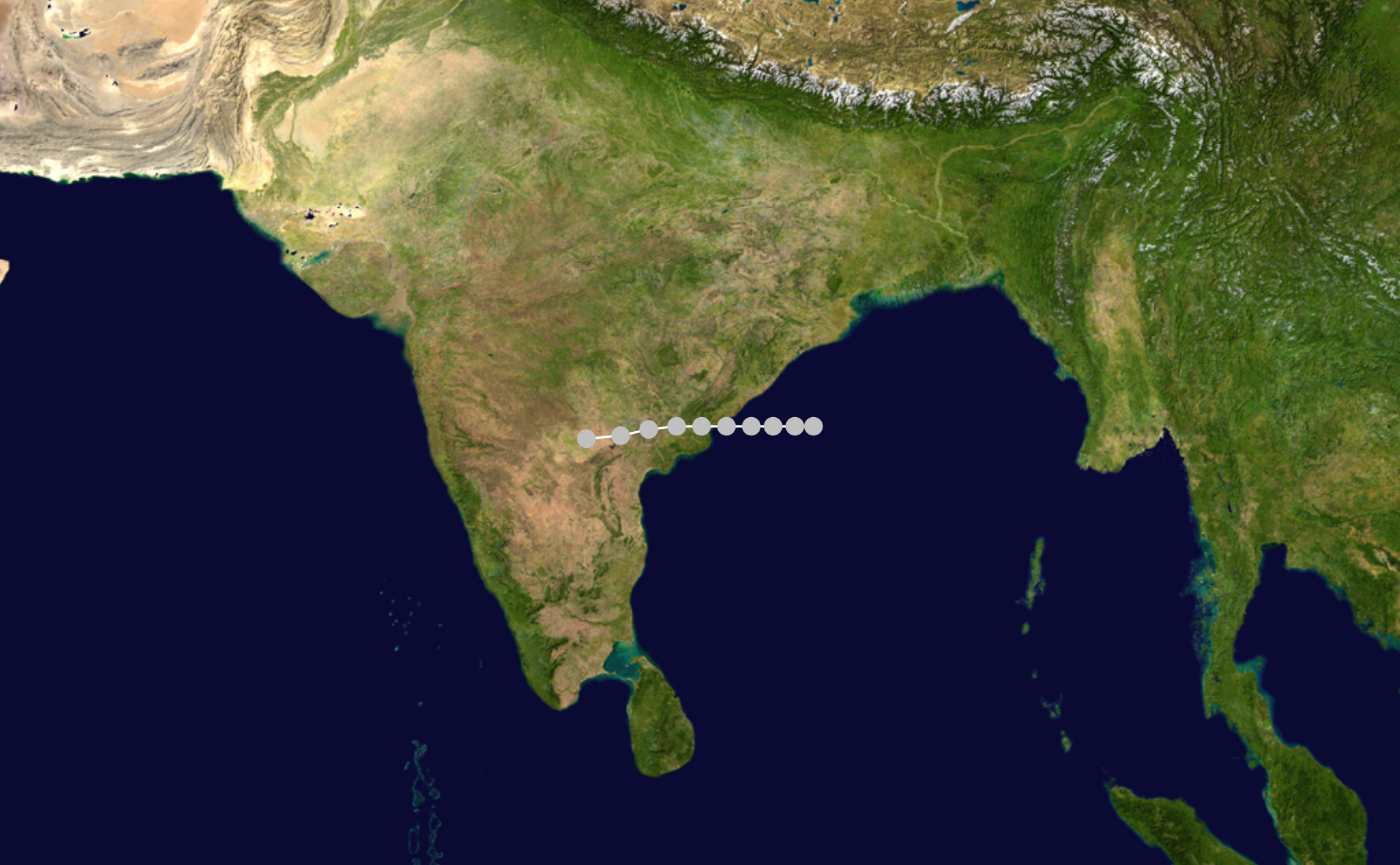
- Duration: September 27 – September 29
- Peak intensity: 55 km/h (35 mph) (3-min); 994 hPa (mbar)

A few fishermen lost their lives off the coast of Kakinada.

=== Deep Depression Eleven ===
- Deep depression (IMD)
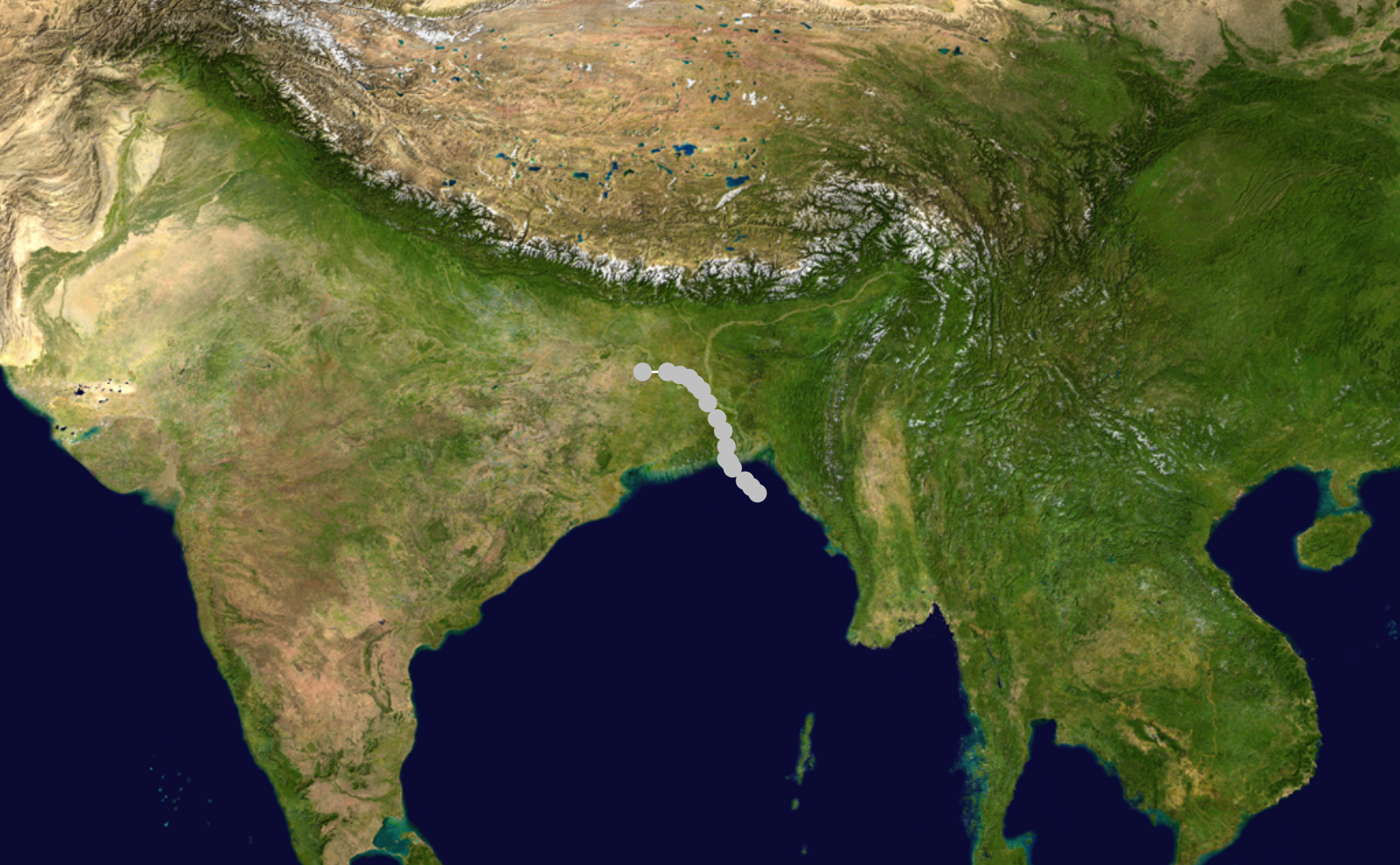
- Duration: October 4 – October 7
- Peak intensity: 35 km/h (25 mph) (3-min); 1001 hPa (mbar)

Deep Depression Eleven developed in the Bay of Bengal on October 4. It soon made landfall in the province of East Pakistan in Pakistan. The deep depression dissipated over eastern India on October 7.

=== Deep Depression Twelve ===
- Deep depression (IMD)
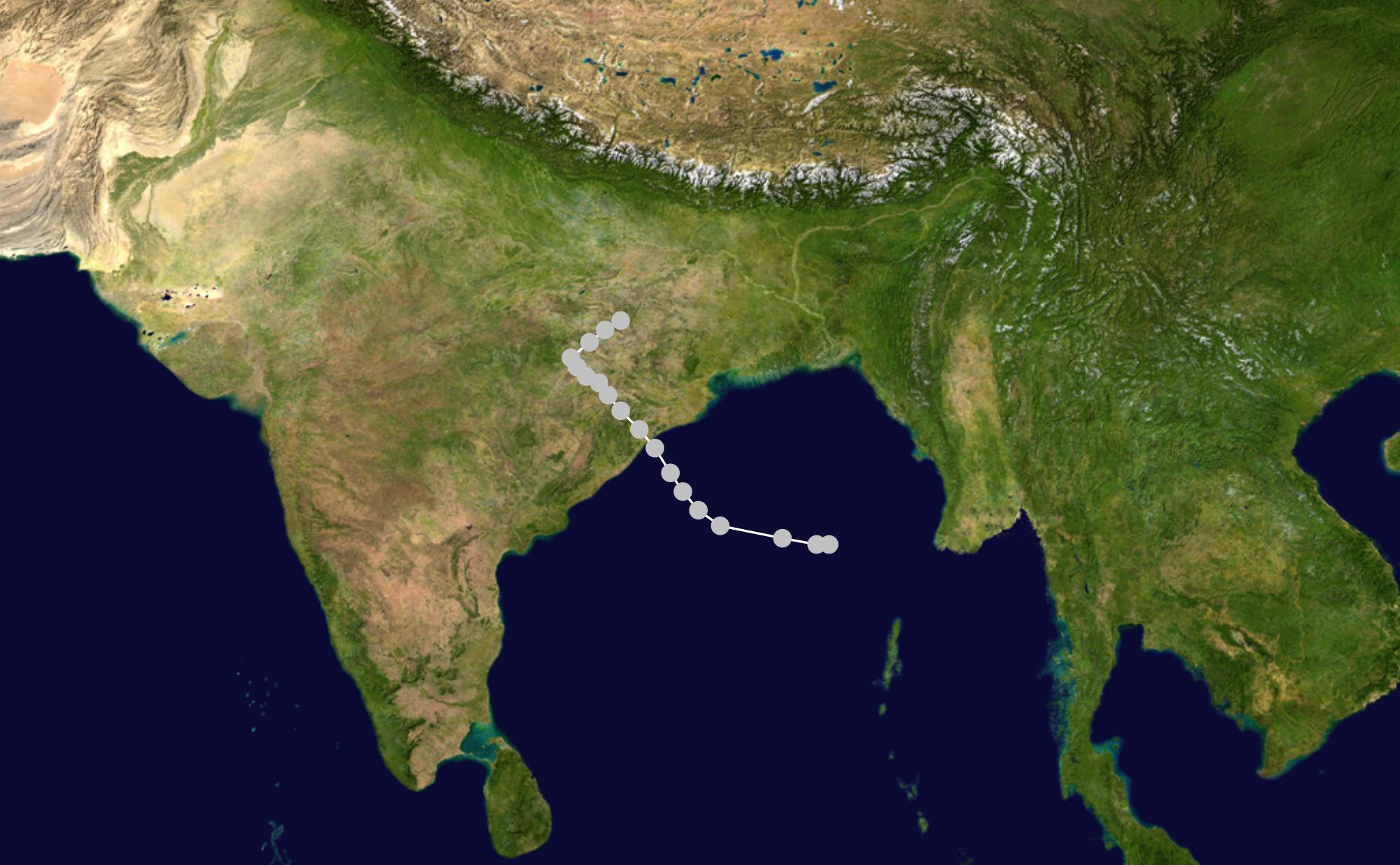
- Duration: October 17 – October 21
- Peak intensity: 45 km/h (30 mph) (3-min); 998 hPa (mbar)

Another deep depression developed in the Bay of Bengal on October 17. It initially moved westward, before eventually re-curving northwestward. The deep depression eventually made landfall in eastern India. By October 21, the deep depression dissipated.

=== Severe Cyclonic Storm Thirteen ===
- Severe cyclonic storm (IMD)
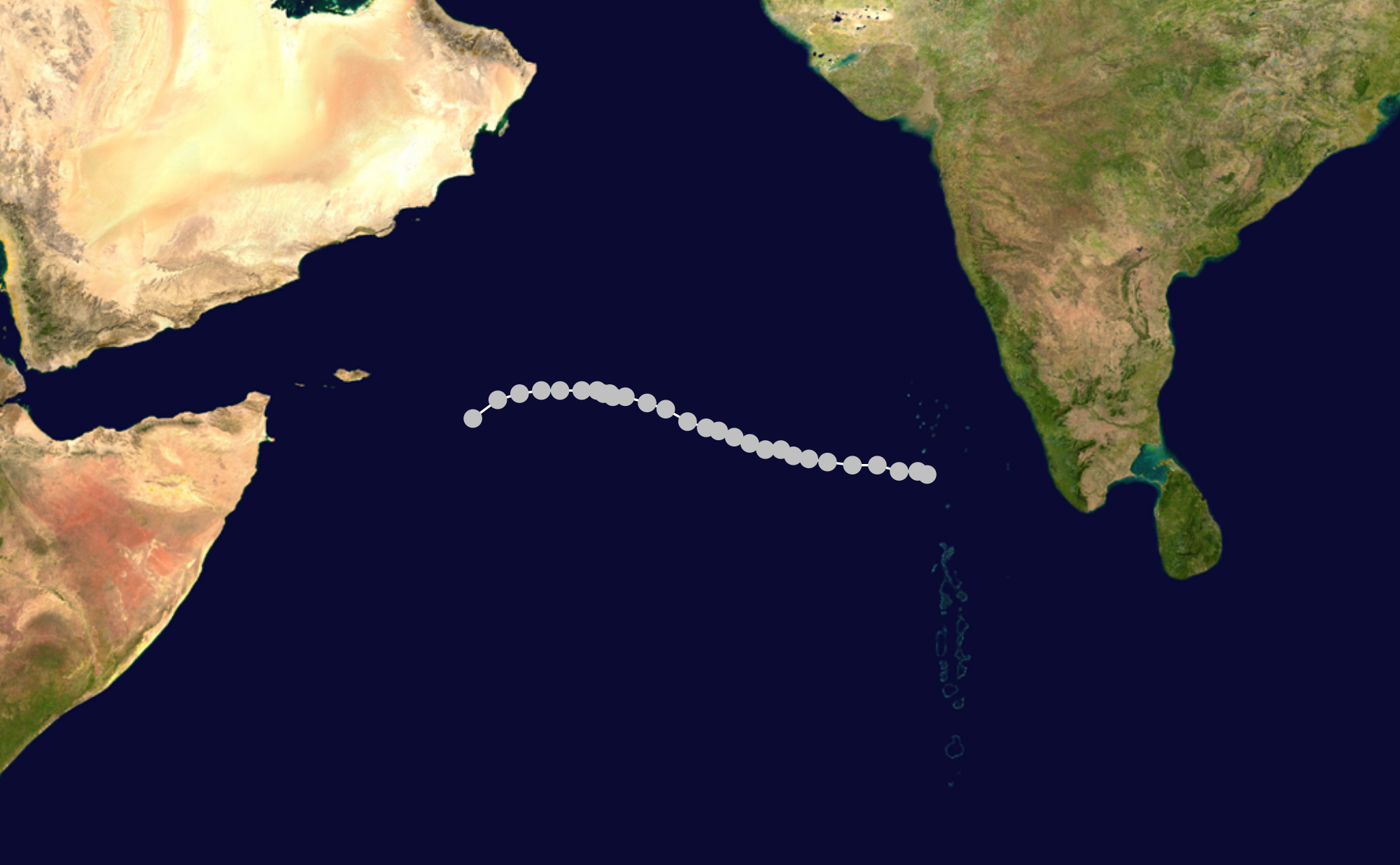
- Duration: November 2 – November 8
- Peak intensity: Winds not specified;

Severe Cyclonic Storm Thirteen

=== Severe Cyclonic Storm Fourteen ===
- Severe cyclonic storm (IMD)
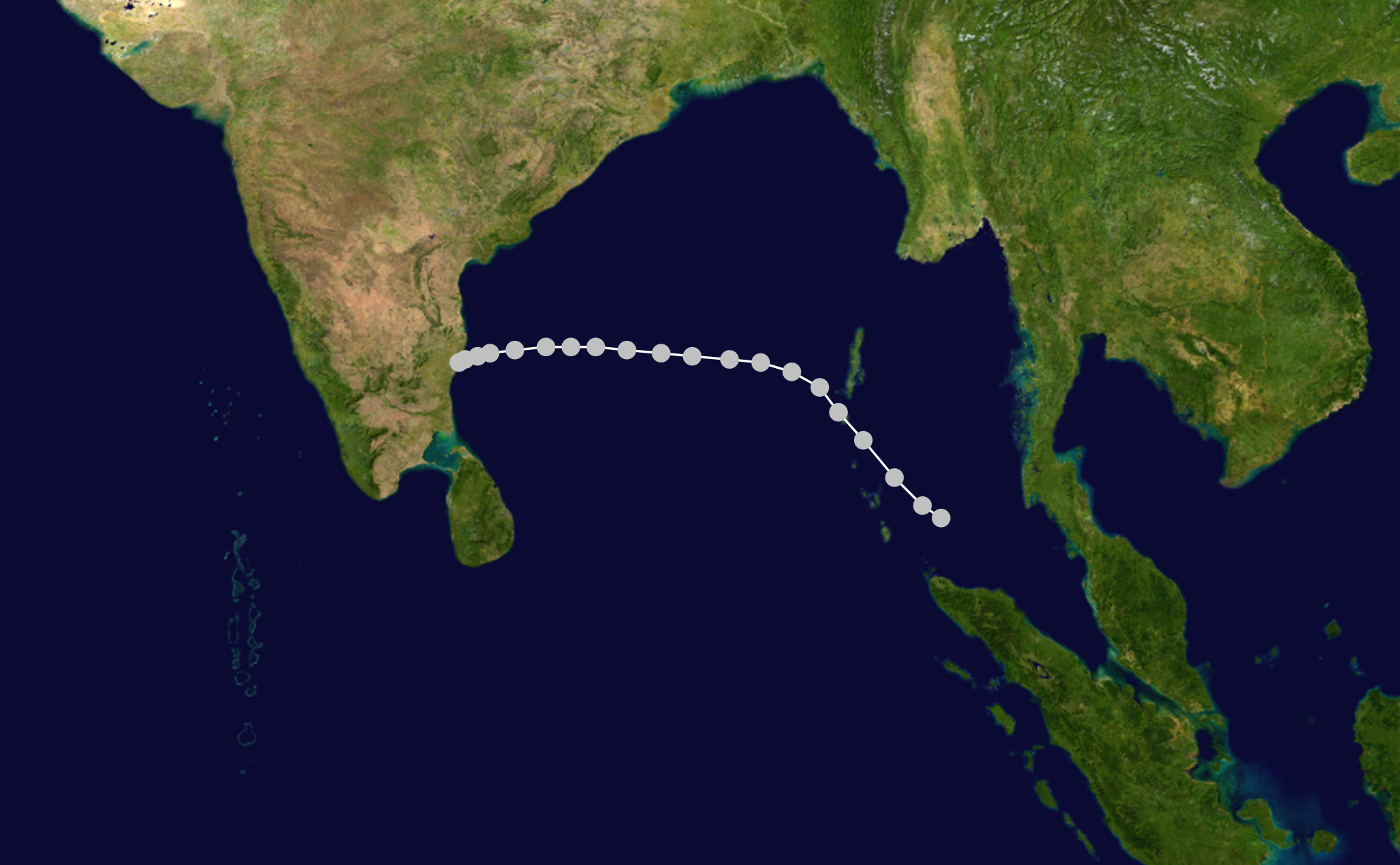
- Duration: November 3 – November 8
- Peak intensity: 75 km/h (45 mph) (3-min); 990 hPa (mbar)

Severe Cyclonic Storm Fourteen developed in the Bay of Bengal on November 3. Initially heading northwestward, the storm eventually curved westward. Shortly before dissipating on November 8, the storm struck southern India.

=== Very Severe Cyclonic Storm Fifteen ===
- Very severe cyclonic storm (IMD)
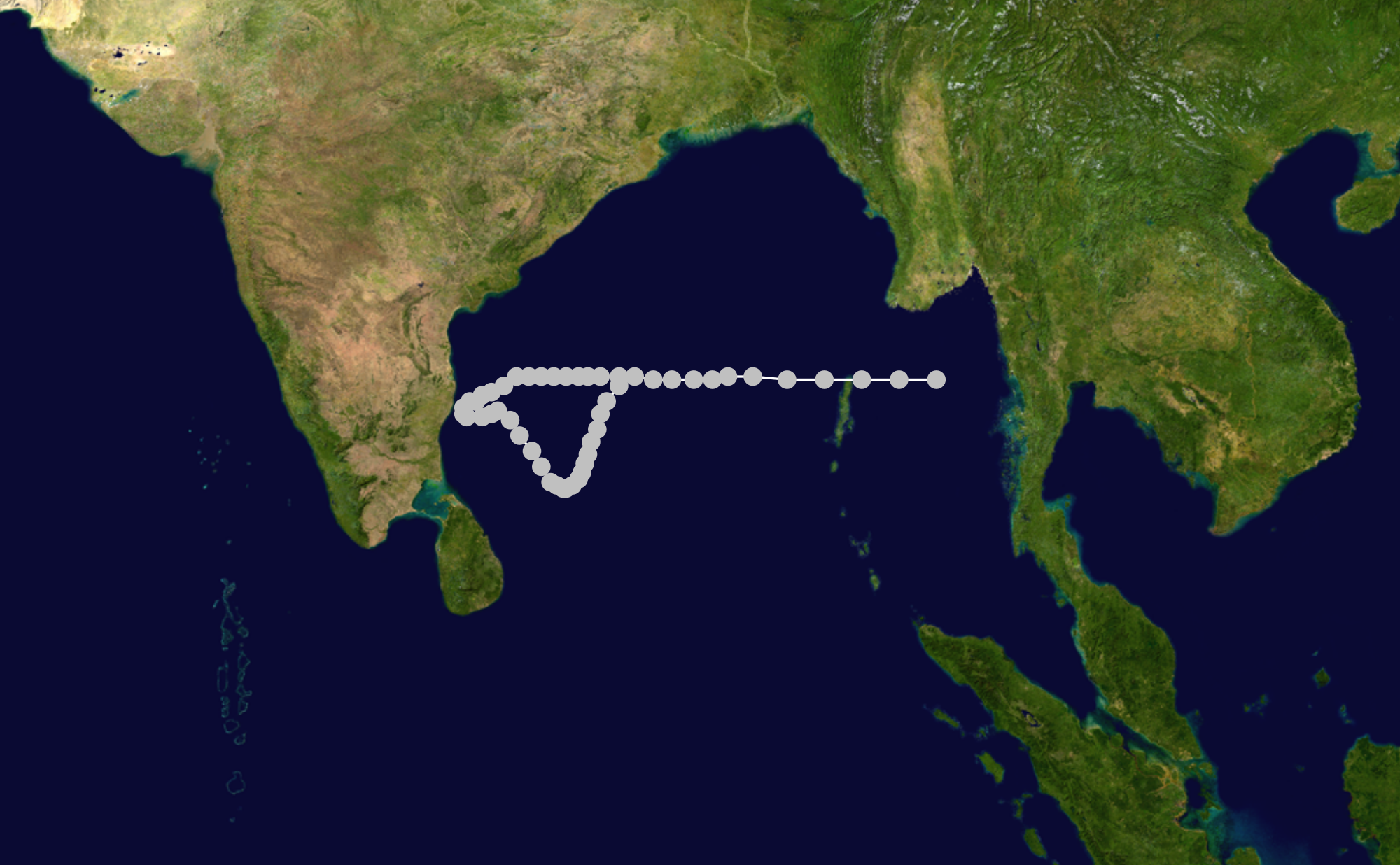
- Duration: November 16 – November 28
- Peak intensity: 130 km/h (80 mph) (3-min); 992 hPa (mbar)

Severe Cyclonic Storm Fifteen developed in the Bay of Bengal on November 16. It meandered there for several days and peaked with winds of 130 km/h (80 mph). Eventually, it weakened and dissipated on November 28. It was tied for the longest-lived cyclone on record in the basin.

=== Super Cyclonic Storm Sixteen ===
- Super cyclonic storm (IMD)
- Category 5 tropical cyclone (SSHWS)
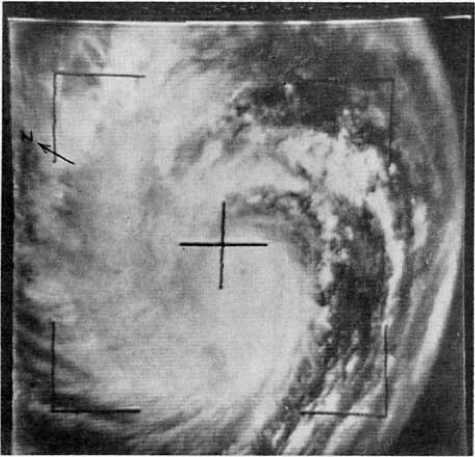
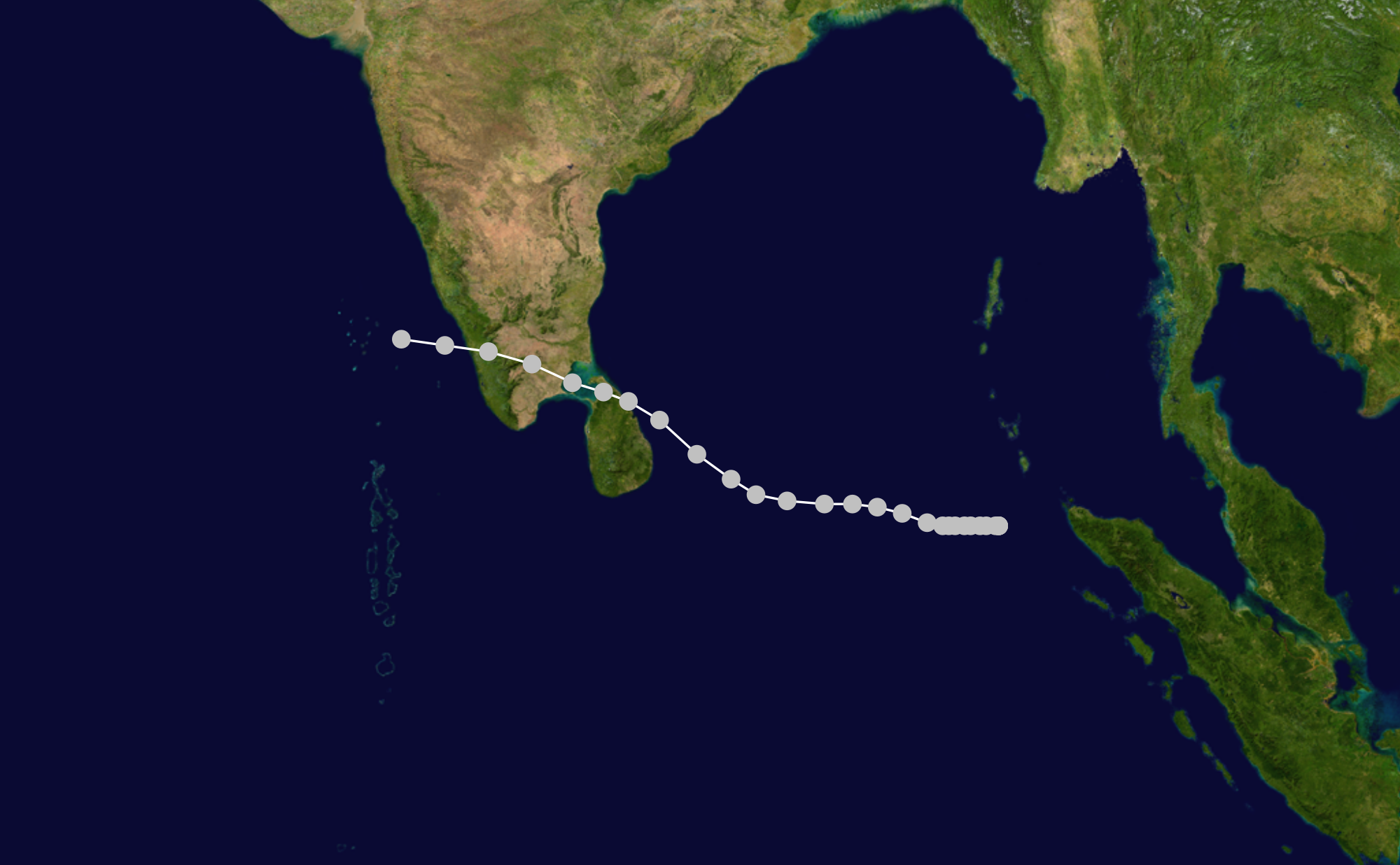
- Duration: December 17 – December 24
- Peak intensity: 240 km/h (150 mph) (3-min); ≤970 hPa (mbar)

On December 15, an area of low pressure was identified over the southern Andaman Sea. Remaining nearly stationary, it gradually developed into a depression two days later. Despite being at a low latitude of 5°N, favorable conditions allowed the system to steadily strengthen, attaining hurricane-force winds by December 19. Spanning approximately 965 km (600 mi), the cyclone reached its peak intensity on December 21 as it approached Ceylon. Based on satellite imagery, it was estimated that the storm had peak winds of 240 km/h (150 mph), with gusts as high as 280 km/h (175 mph). This ranked the system as a modern-day super cyclonic storm. Weakening somewhat, the system continued westward, moving over Tamil Nadu, before rapidly weakening. The system degenerated into a remnant low after emerging over the Arabian Sea on December 24 and dissipated two days later.

Striking Ceylon as a super cyclonic storm, the storm wrought tremendous damage. Winds well in excess of hurricane-force battered the region for over six hours, destroying more than 5,000 homes. In eastern Rameswaram, a passenger train carrying 115 people was swept away by a 4.6 m (15 ft) surge, killing all on board. Nearly every structure in Dhanushkodi was destroyed. Press reports indicated that as many as 2,000 people died on Ceylon, including 350 fishermen offshore. In Tamil Nadu, an estimated 500 people were killed. Damage from the storm amounted to $150 million.

== See also ==
- North Indian Ocean tropical cyclone
- List of tropical cyclone records
- 1964 Atlantic hurricane season
- 1964 Pacific hurricane season
- 1964 Pacific typhoon season
- Australian region cyclone seasons: 1963–64 1964–65
- South Pacific cyclone seasons: 1963–64 1964–65
- South-West Indian Ocean cyclone seasons: 1963–64 1964–65
