= 1961 North Indian Ocean cyclone season =

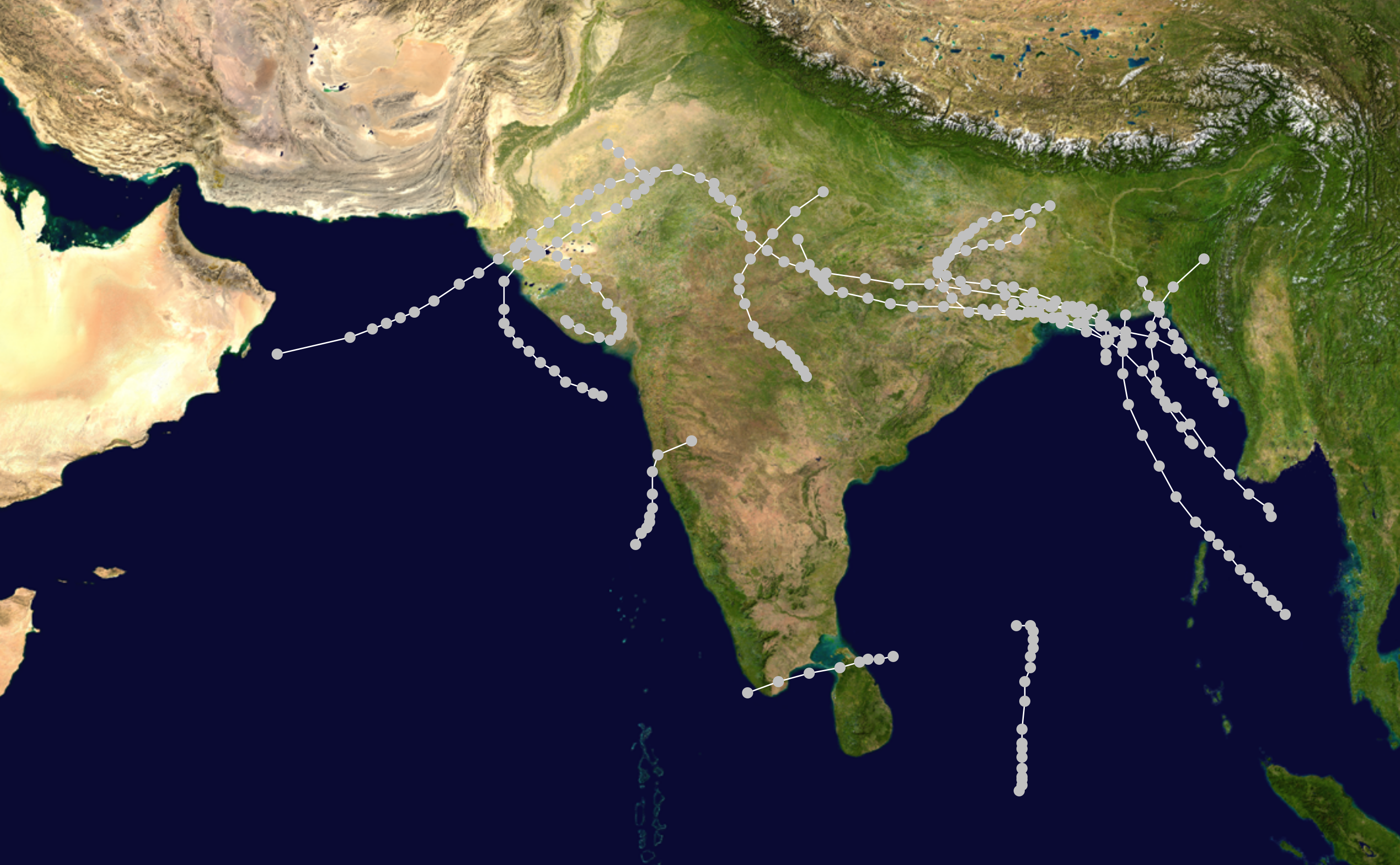
- Season summary map

Seasonal boundaries
- First system formed: January 9, 1961
- Last system dissipated: October 25, 1961

Strongest storm
- Name: Three
  - Maximum winds: 95 km/h (60 mph)
  - Lowest pressure: 980 hPa (mbar)

Seasonal statistics
- Depressions: 18
- Deep depressions: 8
- Cyclonic storms: 5
- Very severe cyclonic storms: 2
- Total fatalities: 11,525 total
- Total damage: Unknown

Related articles
- 1961 Atlantic hurricane season; 1961 Pacific hurricane season; 1961 Pacific typhoon season

The 1961 North Indian Ocean cyclone season had no bounds, but cyclones tend to form between April and December, with peaks in May and November. These dates conventionally delimit the period of each year when most tropical cyclones form in the northern Indian Ocean. There are two main seas in the North Indian Ocean—the Bay of Bengal to the east of the Indian subcontinent and the Arabian Sea to the west of India. The official Regional Specialized Meteorological Centre in this basin is the India Meteorological Department (IMD), while the Joint Typhoon Warning Center releases unofficial advisories. An average of four to six storms form in the North Indian Ocean every season with peaks in May and November. Cyclones occurring between the meridians 45°E and 100°E are included in the season by the IMD.

== Systems ==
=== Depression One ===
- Depression (IMD)
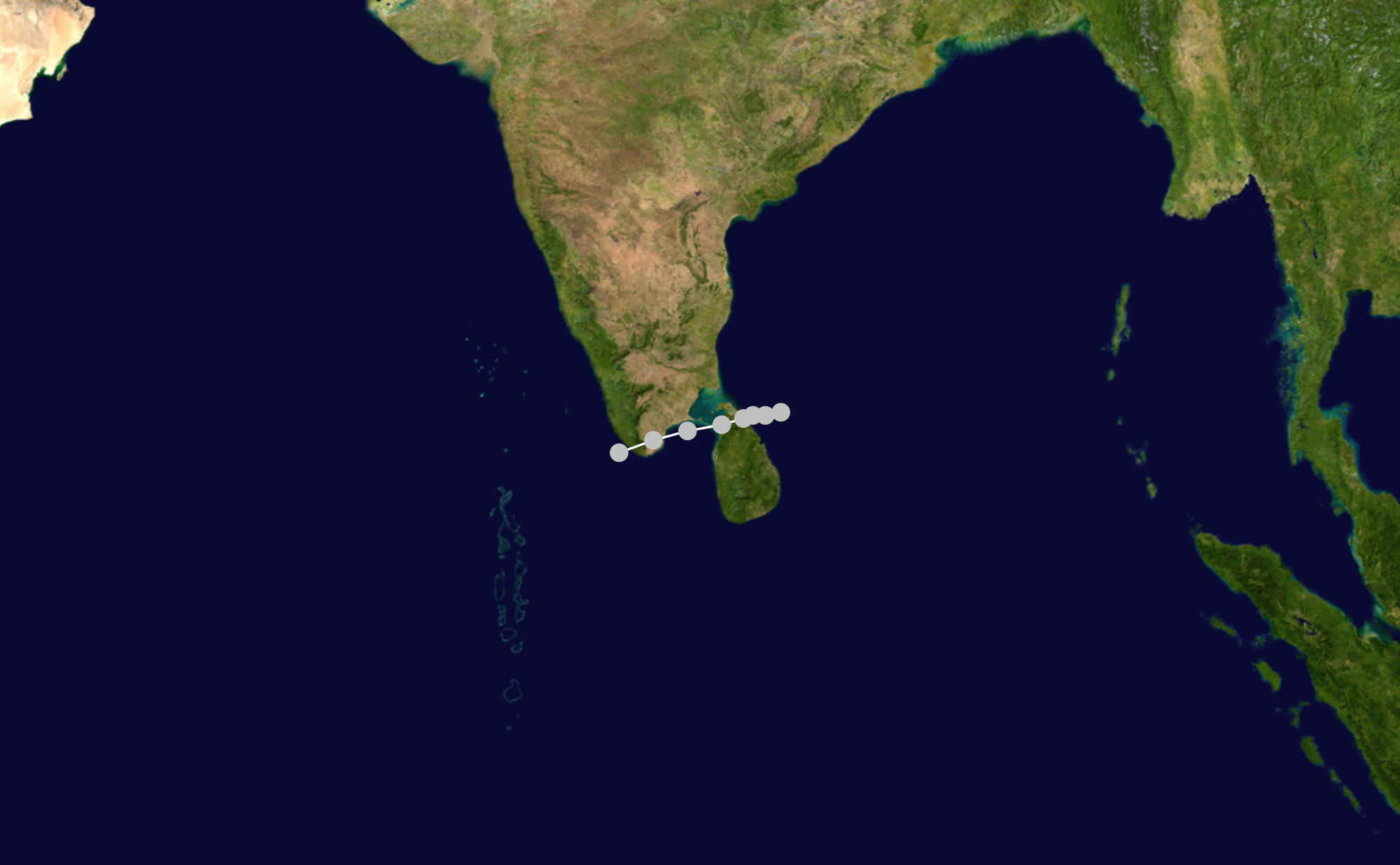
- Duration: January 9 – January 11
- Peak intensity: 55 km/h (35 mph) (3-min); 1006 hPa (mbar)

A depression developed on January 9. It cut across northern Ceylon and southern India before dissipating on January 11.

=== Deep Depression Two ===
- Deep depression (IMD)
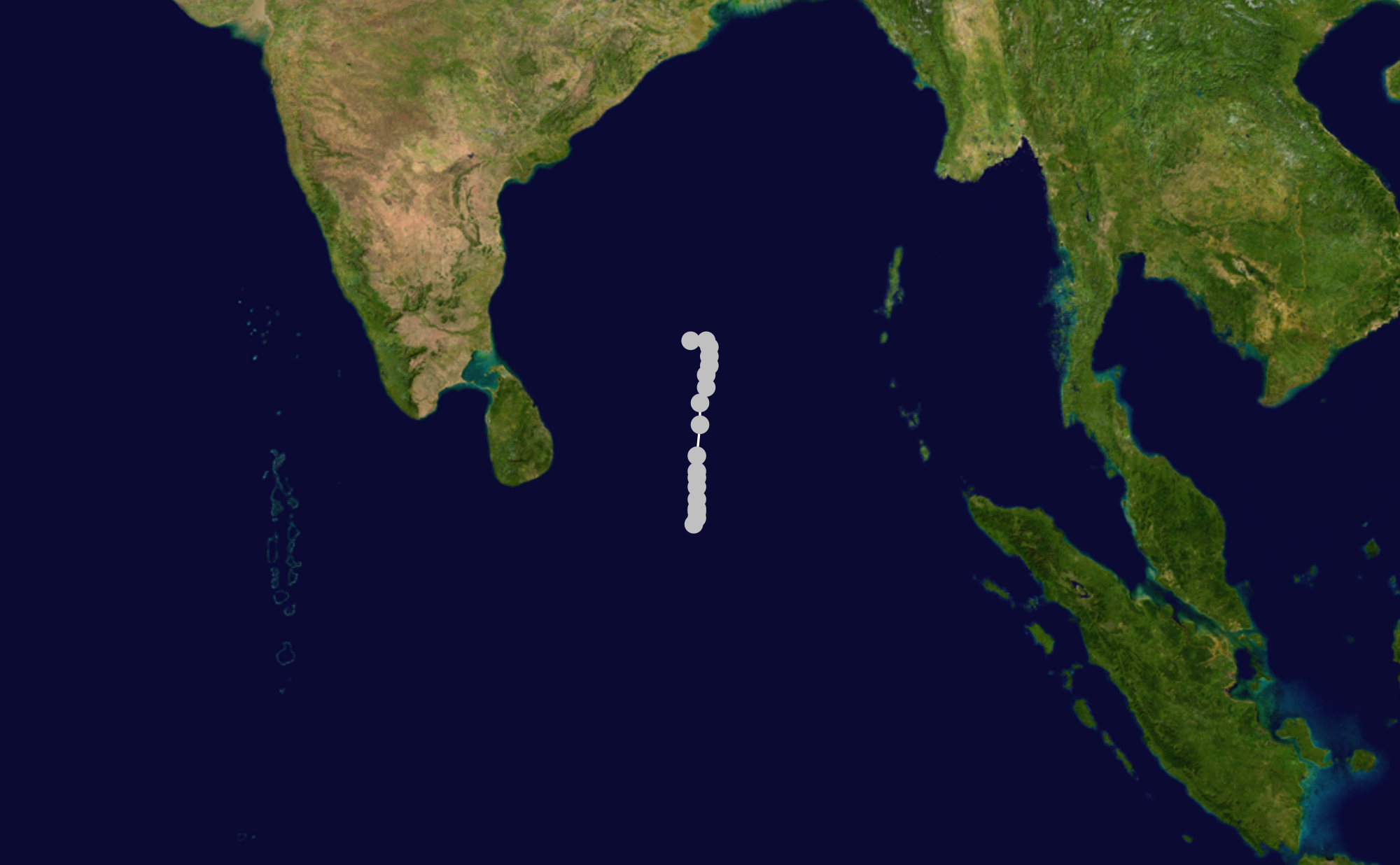
- Duration: February 18 – February 21
- Peak intensity: 55 km/h (35 mph) (3-min); 1006 hPa (mbar)

A deep depression developed in the Bay of Bengal on February 18. It moved generally northward and dissipated on February 21.

=== Severe Cyclonic Storm Three (Winnie) ===
- Severe cyclonic storm (IMD)
- Category 2 tropical cyclone (SSHWS)
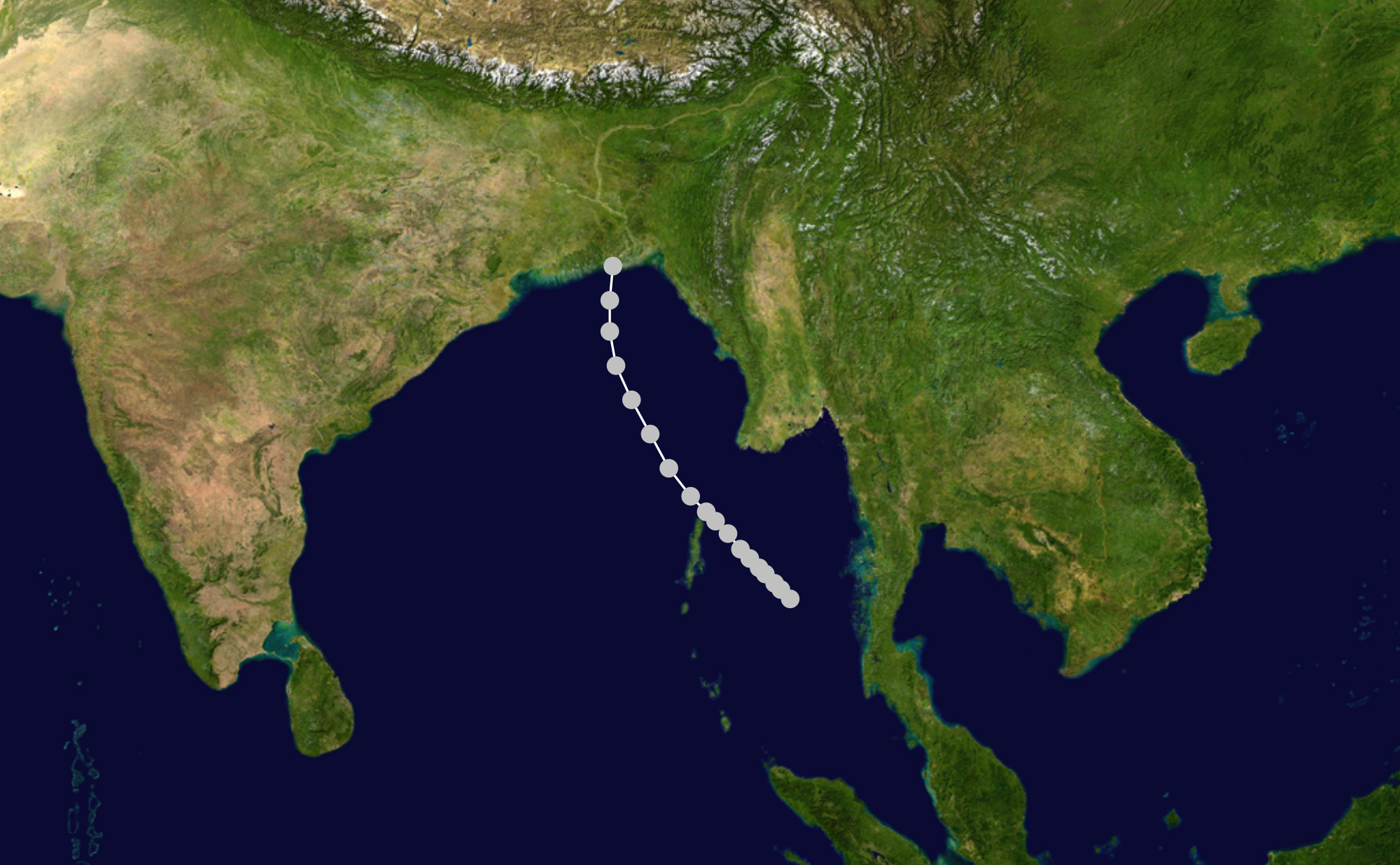
- Duration: May 5 – May 9
- Peak intensity: 95 km/h (60 mph) (3-min); 980 hPa (mbar)

From May 6–9, the JTWC tracked this system as Tropical Storm Winnie. The National Oceanic and Atmospheric Administration (NOAA) estimated that the storm attained peak one-minute winds of 155 km/h (95 mph).

In East Pakistan, 11,468 people were killed.

=== Very Severe Cyclonic Storm Four ===
- Very severe cyclonic storm (IMD)
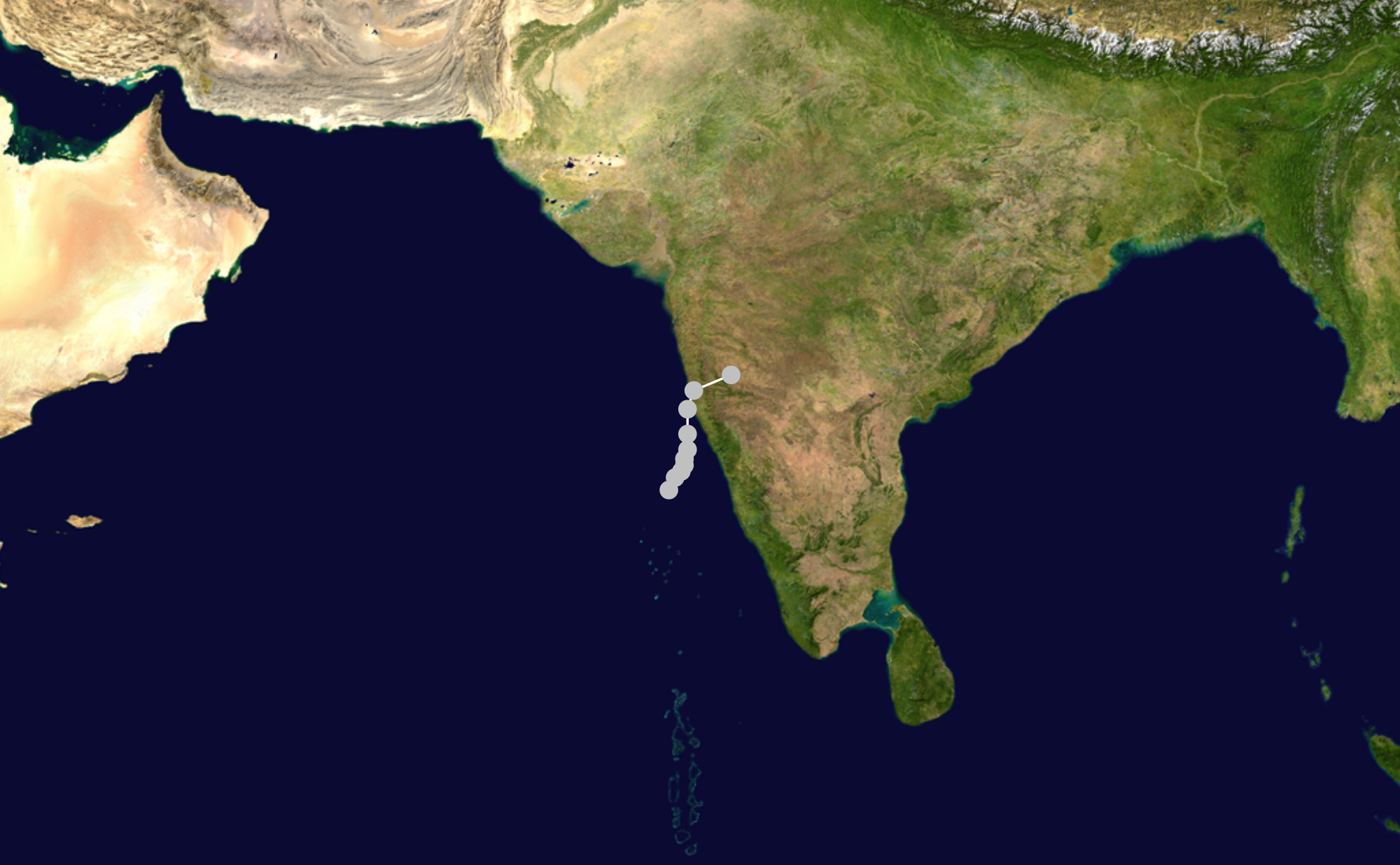
- Duration: May 23 – May 25
- Peak intensity: 120 km/h (75 mph) (3-min); 984 hPa (mbar)

It caused considerable damage in southwestern India.

=== Very Severe Cyclonic Storm Five ===
- Very severe cyclonic storm (IMD)
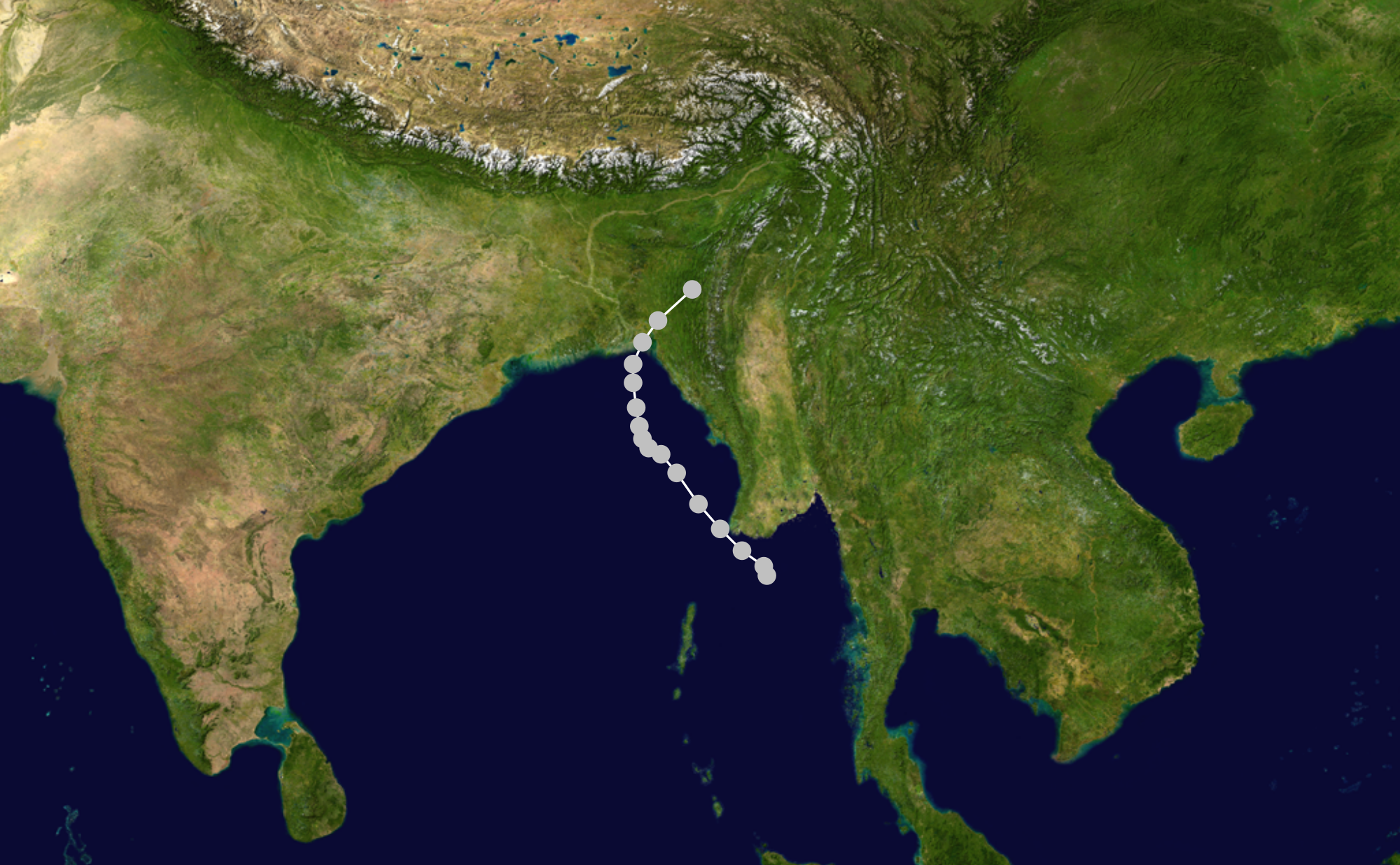
- Duration: May 27 – May 30
- Peak intensity: 120 km/h (75 mph) (3-min); 983 hPa (mbar)

Caused considerable damage in East Pakistan, where wind gusts reached 155 km/h (95 mph). A storm surge of 6.4 m (21 ft) was measured in Chittagong. Due to advanced warnings, put out an unprecedented 36 hours before the storm, relatively few casualties took place.

=== Depression Six ===
- Depression (IMD)
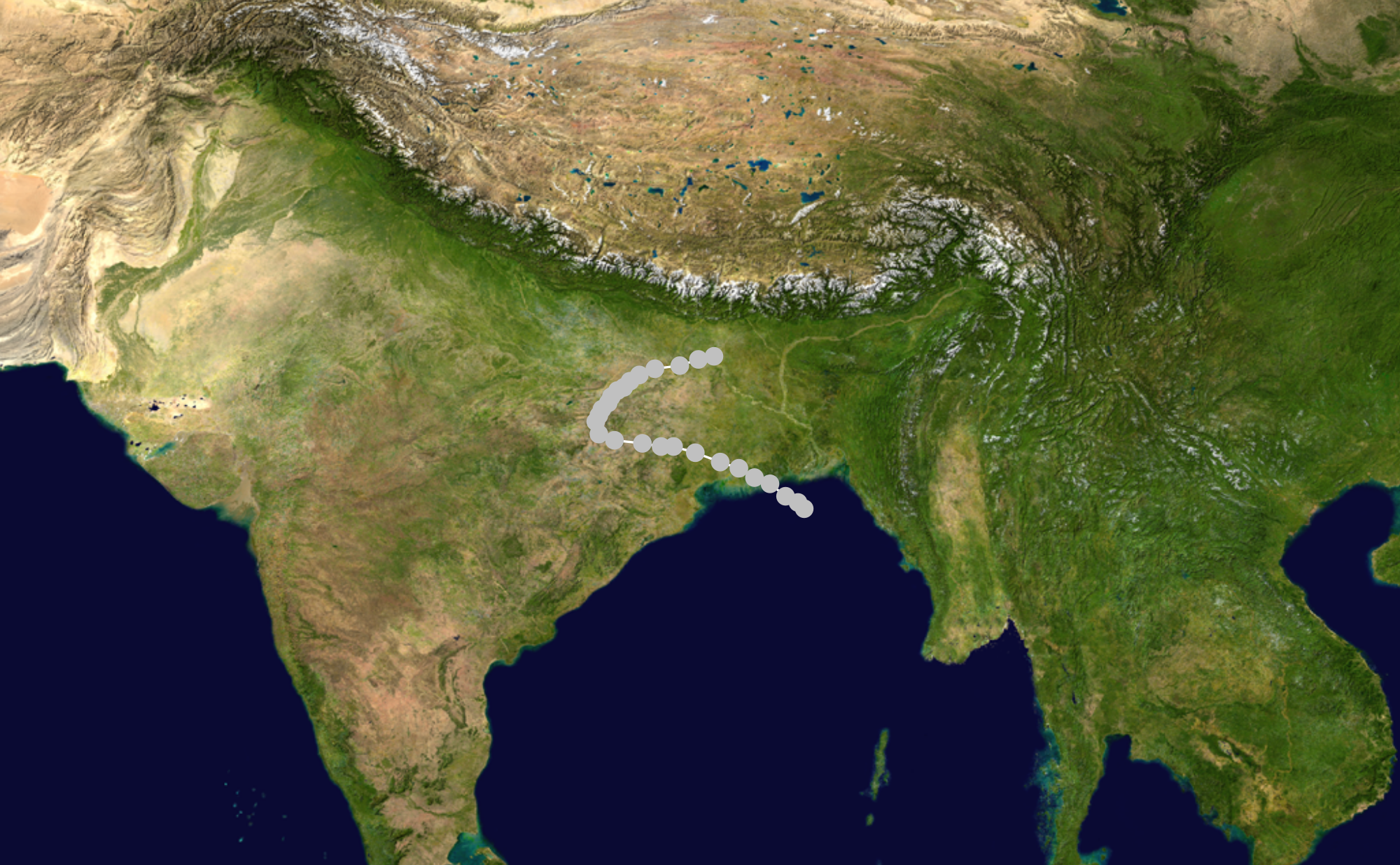
- Duration: June 8 – June 13
- Peak intensity: 55 km/h (35 mph) (3-min); 994 hPa (mbar)

Produced torrential rain over northeastern India, with Cherrapunji recording 1,340 mm (53 in) of precipitation over a four-day span.

=== Severe Cyclonic Storm Seven ===
- Severe cyclonic storm (IMD)
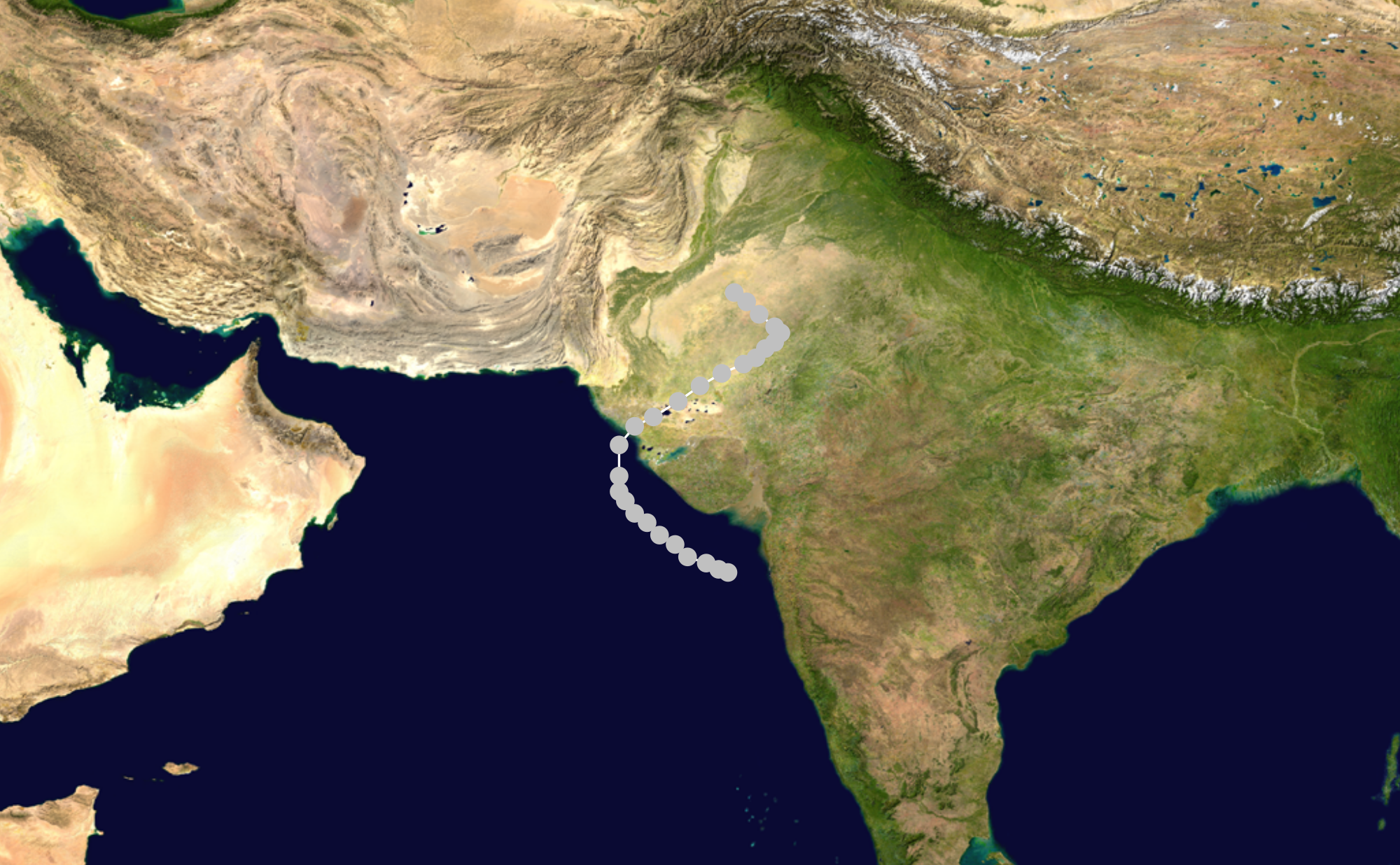
- Duration: June 21 – June 26
- Peak intensity: 100 km/h (65 mph) (3-min);

A severe cyclonic storm developed in the Arabian Sea on June 21. The system struck western India before dissipating on June 26.

=== Depression Eight ===
- Depression (IMD)
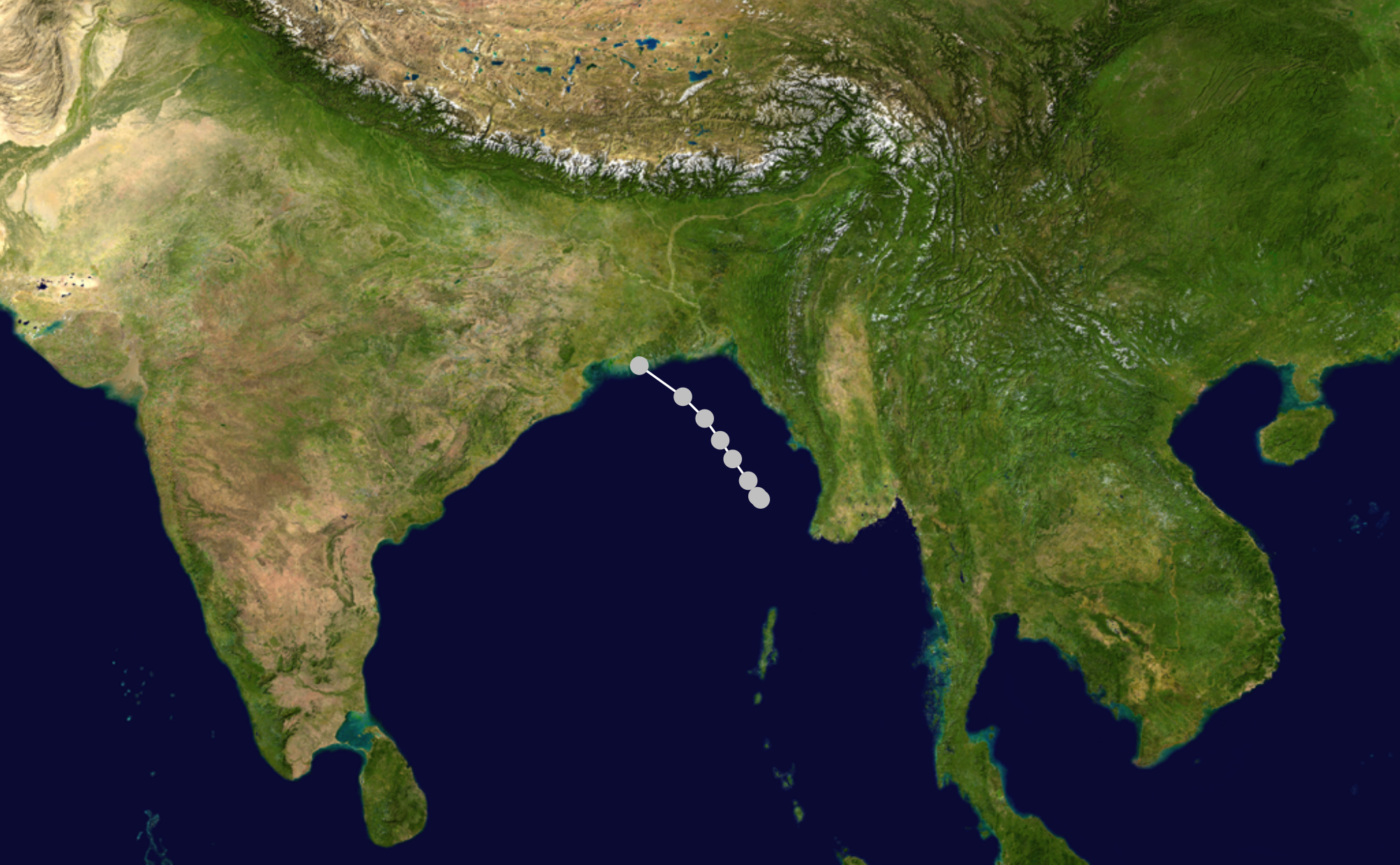
- Duration: June 27 – June 28
- Peak intensity: 35 km/h (25 mph) (3-min);

A depression developed in the Bay of Bengal on June 27. The system struck the state of West Bengal in India and promptly dissipated.

=== Land Depression Ten ===
- Depression (IMD)
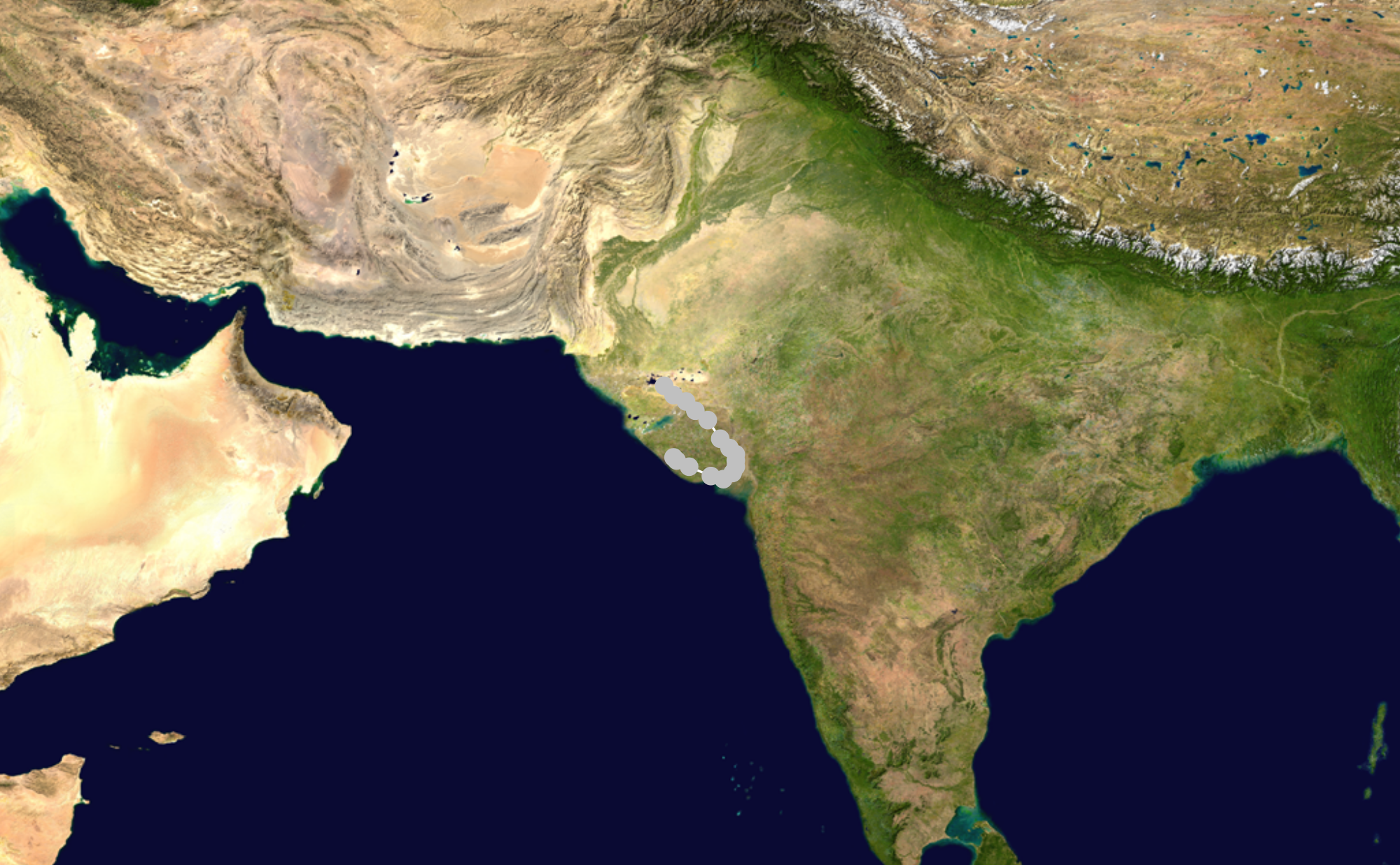
- Duration: June 27 – June 28
- Peak intensity: 35 km/h (25 mph) (3-min);

The depression remained around the Gujarat Peninsula for several days, resulting in prolonged rains that amounted to 680 mm (27 in) in Junagadh.

=== Depression Nine ===
- Depression (IMD)
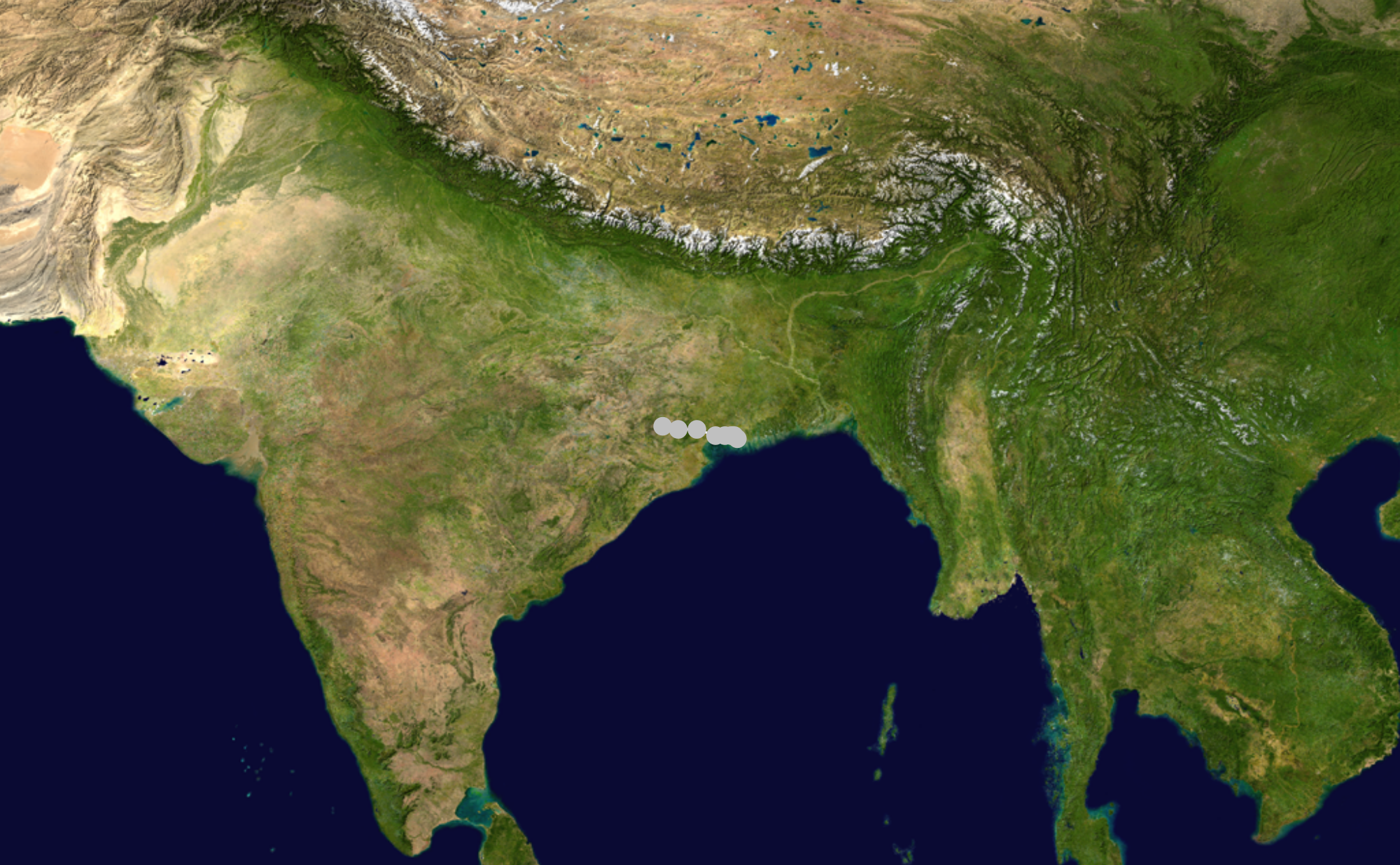
- Duration: July 1 – July 2
- Peak intensity: Winds not specified;

The ninth depression of the season existed inland over eastern India. It developed on July 1 and dissipated the following day.

=== Land Depression Eleven ===
- Depression (IMD)
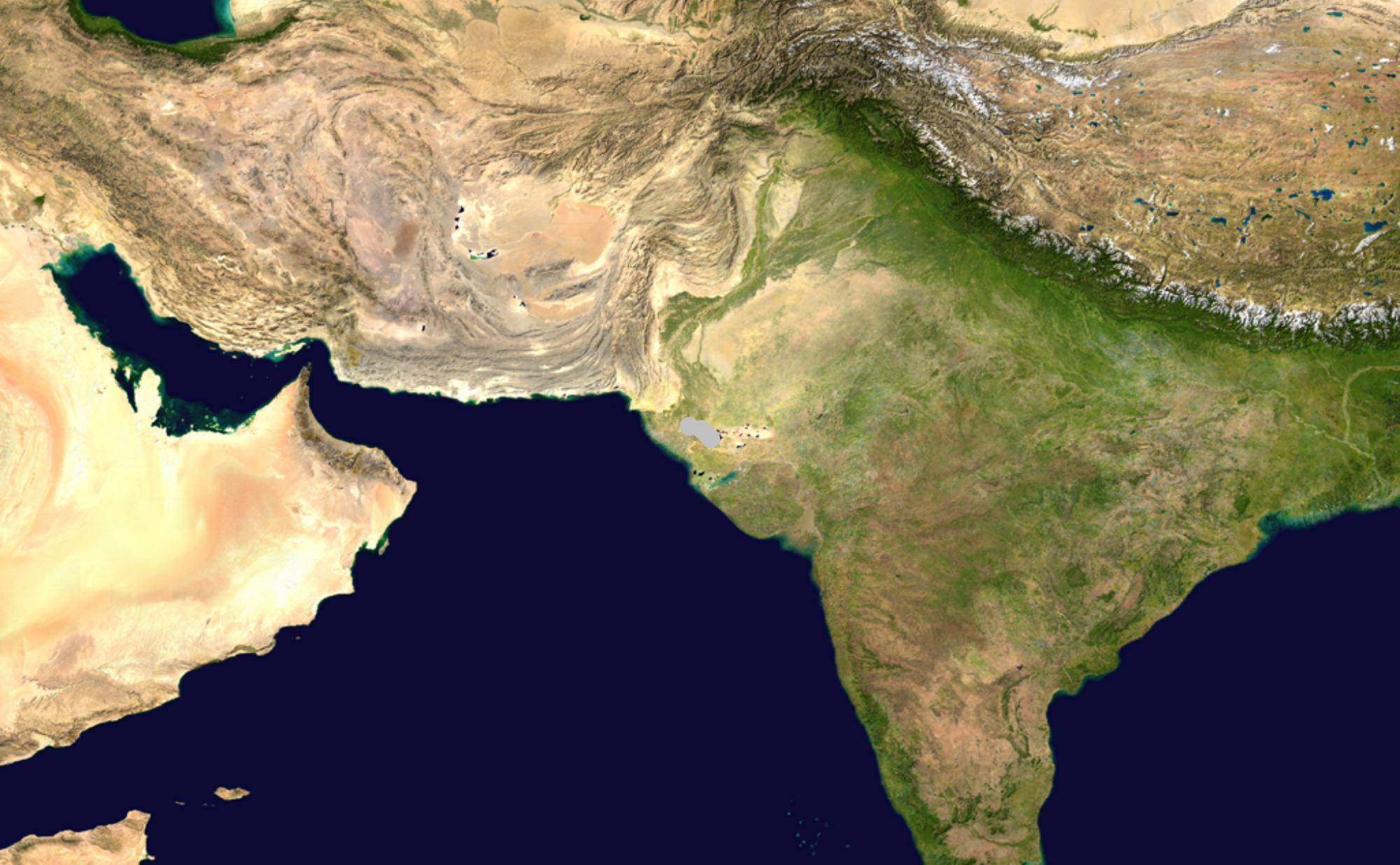
- Duration: July 18 – July 19
- Peak intensity: 75 km/h (45 mph) (3-min);

Another land depression briefly existed over western India from July 18 to July 19.

=== Depression Twelve ===
- Depression (IMD)
- Duration: August 27 – August 28
- Peak intensity: 55 km/h (35 mph) (3-min); 995 hPa (mbar)

The twelfth depression of the season existed from August 27 to August 28.

=== Deep Depression Thirteen ===
- Deep depression (IMD)
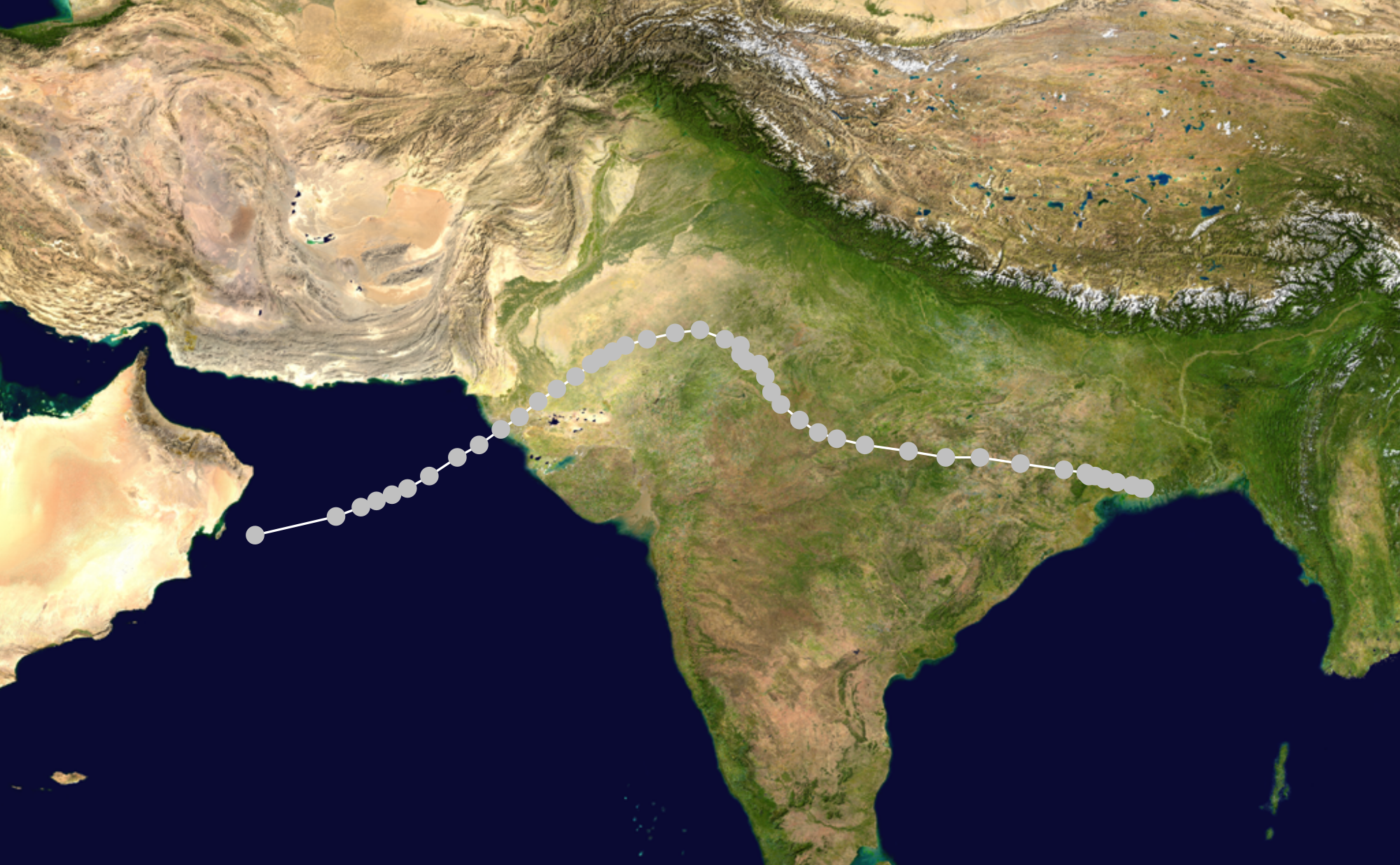
- Duration: September 6 – September 16
- Peak intensity: 55 km/h (35 mph) (3-min); 992 hPa (mbar)

Deep depression produced heavy rains over a large swath of northern India, with several areas reporting daily totals in excess of 300 mm (12 in).

=== Cyclonic Storm Fourteen ===
- Cyclonic storm (IMD)
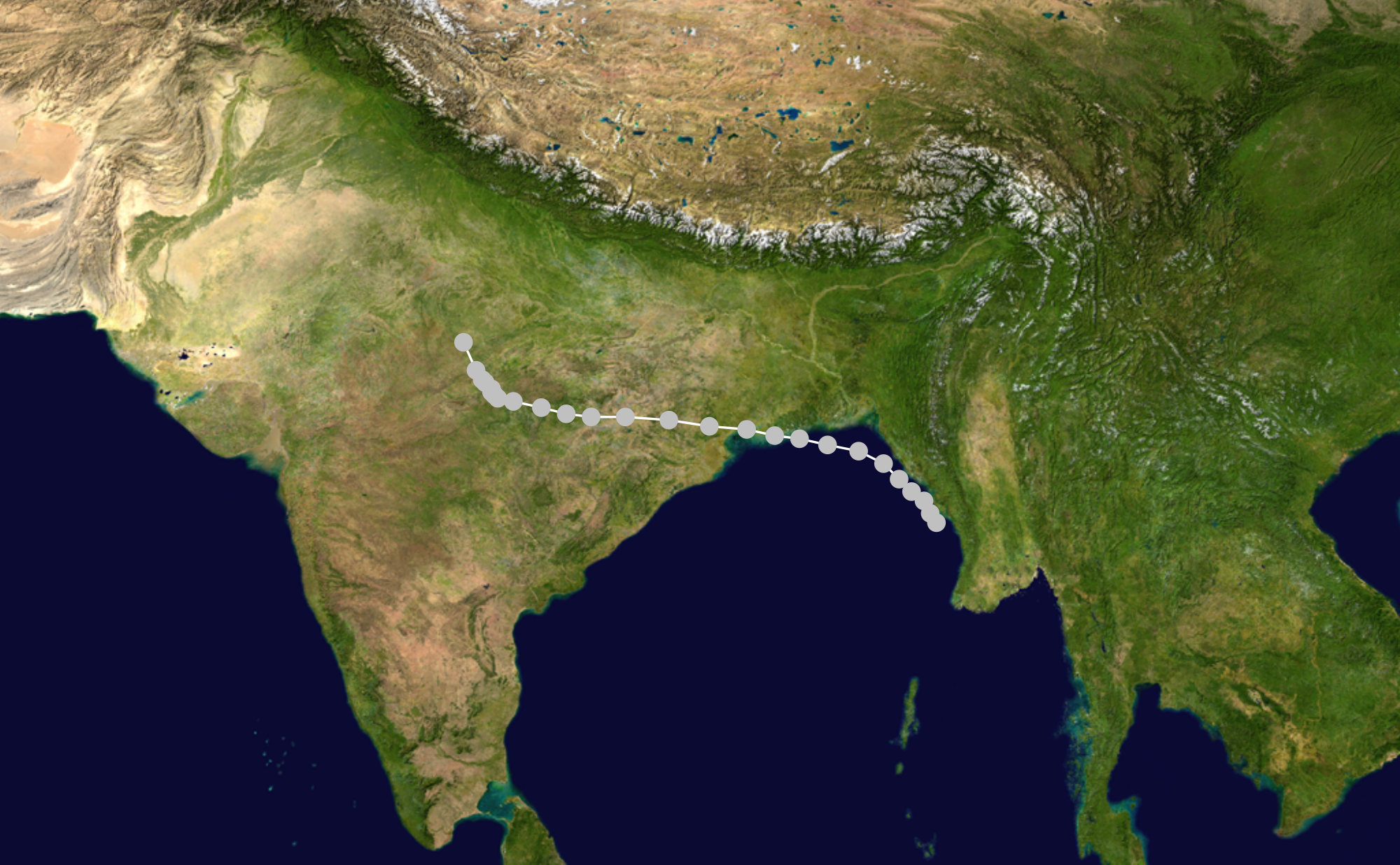
- Duration: September 11 – September 17
- Peak intensity: 75 km/h (45 mph) (3-min); 987 hPa (mbar)

Heavy rains from the storm caused significant flooding in Vidarbha and Madhya Pradesh.

=== Depression Fifteen ===
- Depression (IMD)
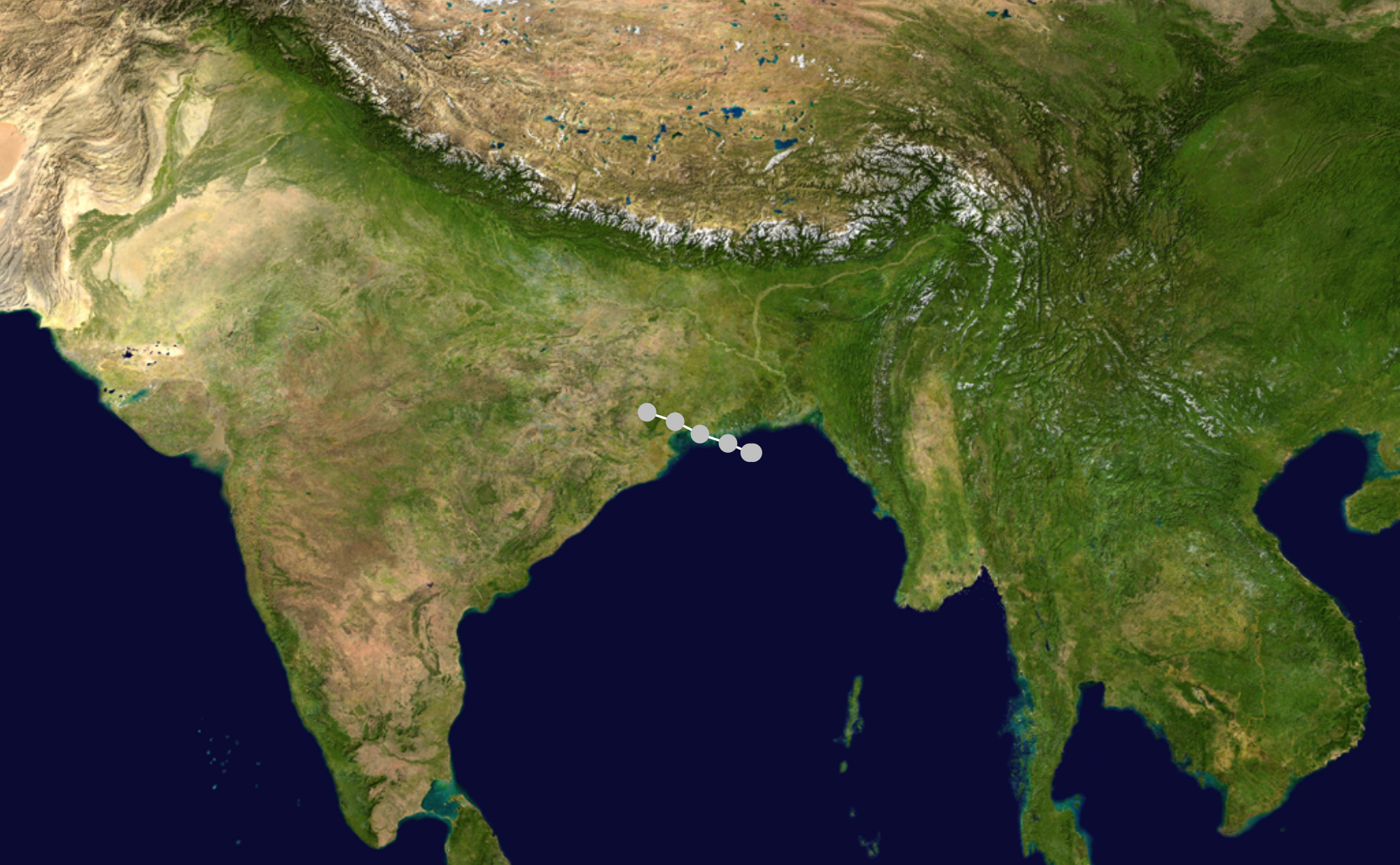
- Duration: September 22 – September 23
- Peak intensity: Winds not specified;

The fifteenth depression of the season developed in the northern Bay of Bengal on September 22. It then struck West Bengal before dissipating on September 23.

=== Deep Depression Sixteen ===
- Deep depression (IMD)
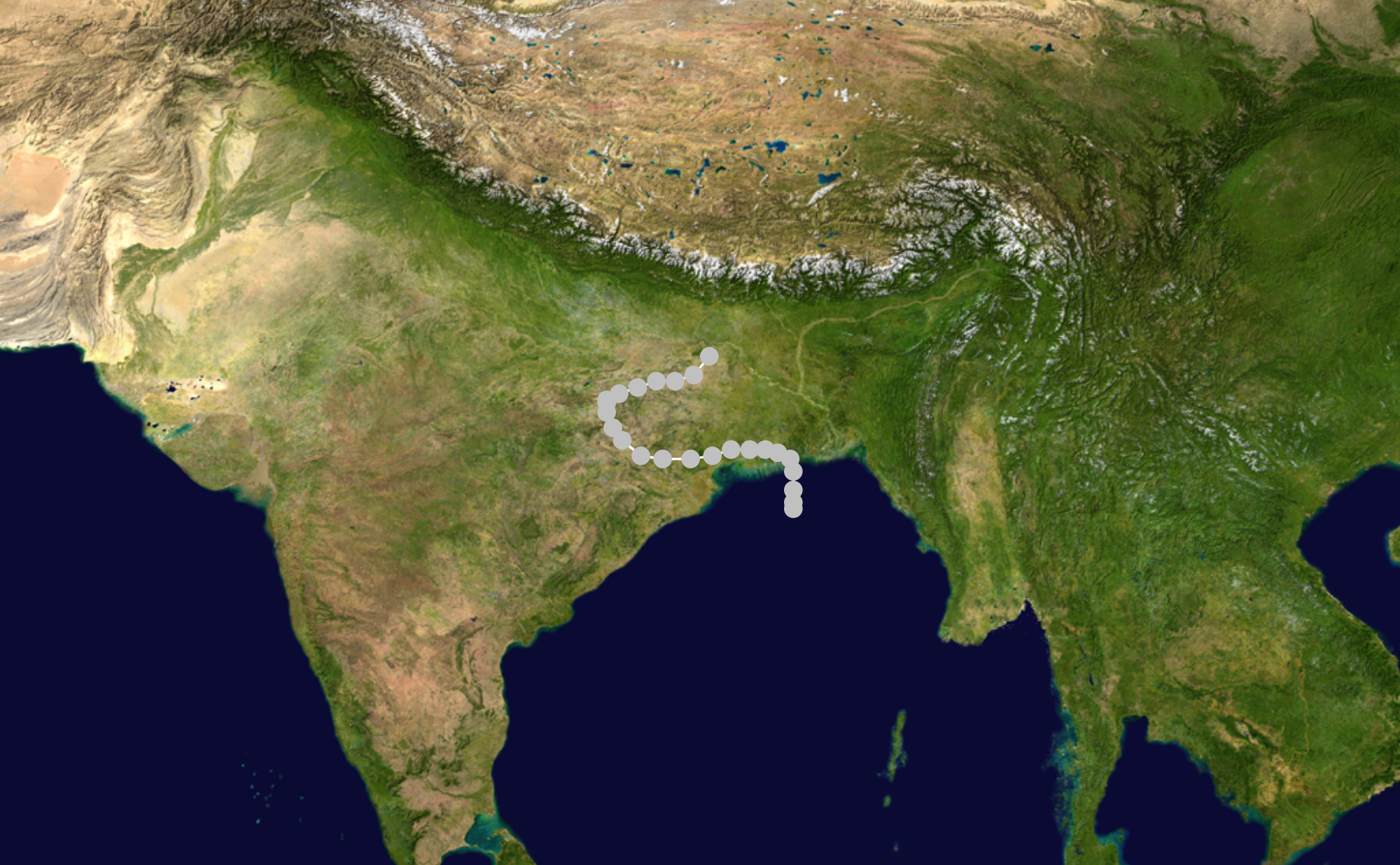
- Duration: September 27 – October 2
- Peak intensity: 55 km/h (35 mph) (3-min);

A deep depression developed in the Bay of Bengal on September 27. The system then moved inland over West Bengal. It meandered inland until dissipating on October 2.

=== Land Depression Seventeen ===
- Depression (IMD)
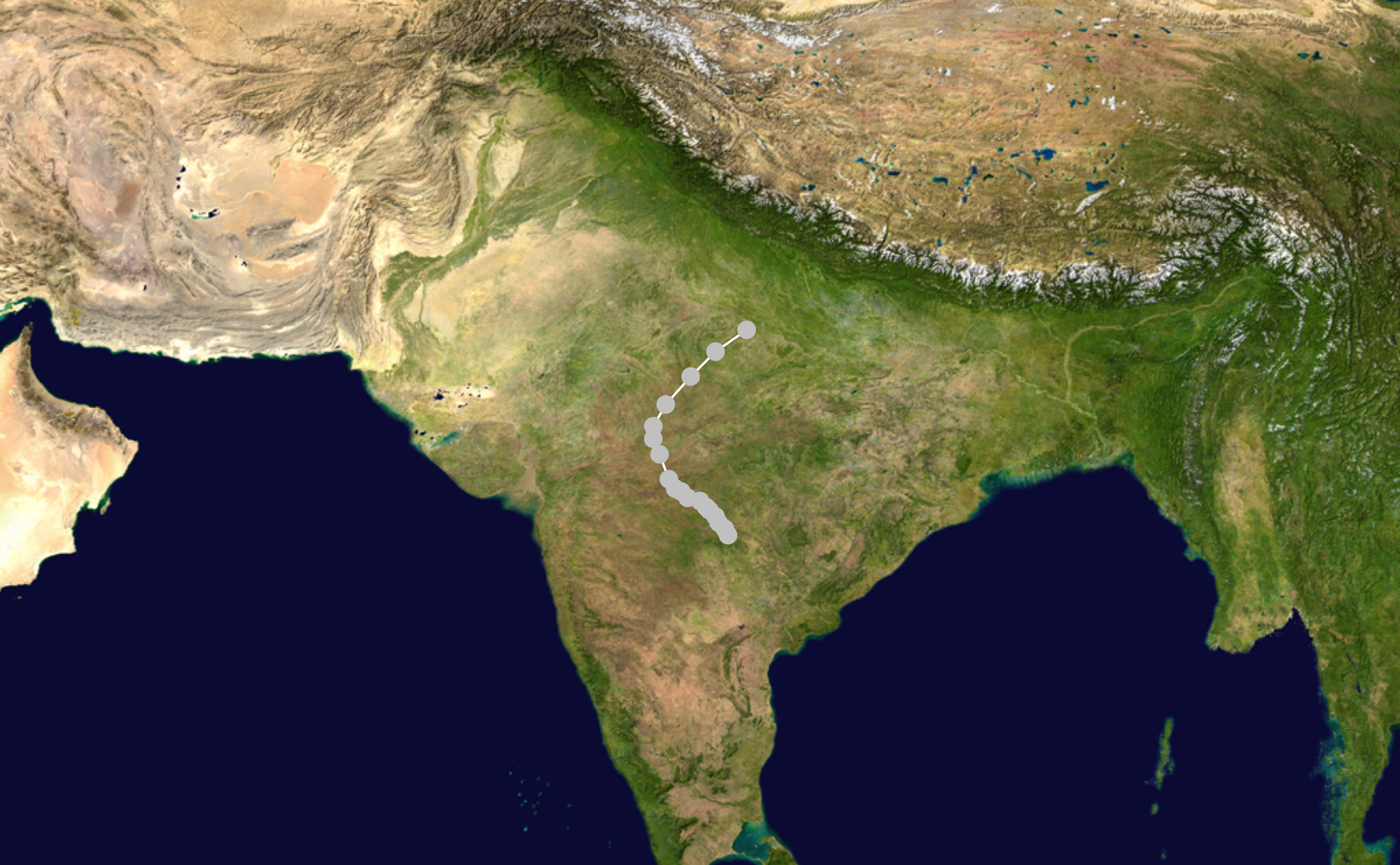
- Duration: October 9 – October 13
- Peak intensity: Winds not specified;

Significant flooding resulted from the depression's heavy rains, with 57 fatalities occurring in Uttar Pradesh.

=== Depression Eighteen ===
- Depression (IMD)
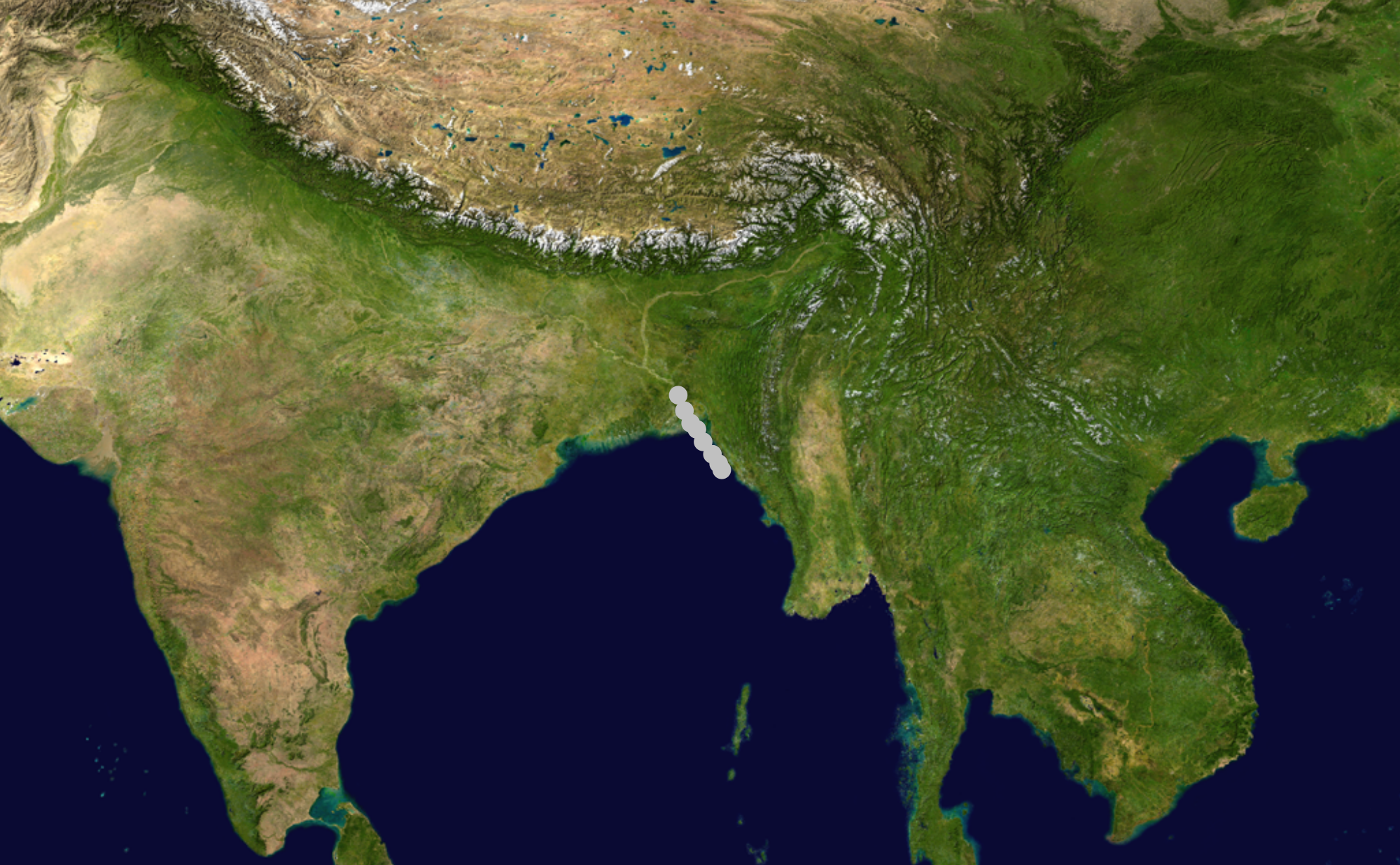
- Duration: October 24 – October 25
- Peak intensity: 45 km/h (30 mph) (3-min); 1009 hPa (mbar)

The final depression of the season developed in the Bay of Bengal on October 24. It soon struck the province of East Pakistan in Pakistan and dissipated on the following day.

== See also ==
- North Indian Ocean tropical cyclone
- List of tropical cyclone records
- List of wettest tropical cyclones
- 1961 Atlantic hurricane season
- 1961 Pacific hurricane season
- 1961 Pacific typhoon season
- Australian region cyclone seasons: 1960–61 1961–62
- South Pacific cyclone seasons: 1960–61 1961–62
- South-West Indian Ocean cyclone seasons: 1960–61 1961–62
