= 1961 Pacific hurricane season =

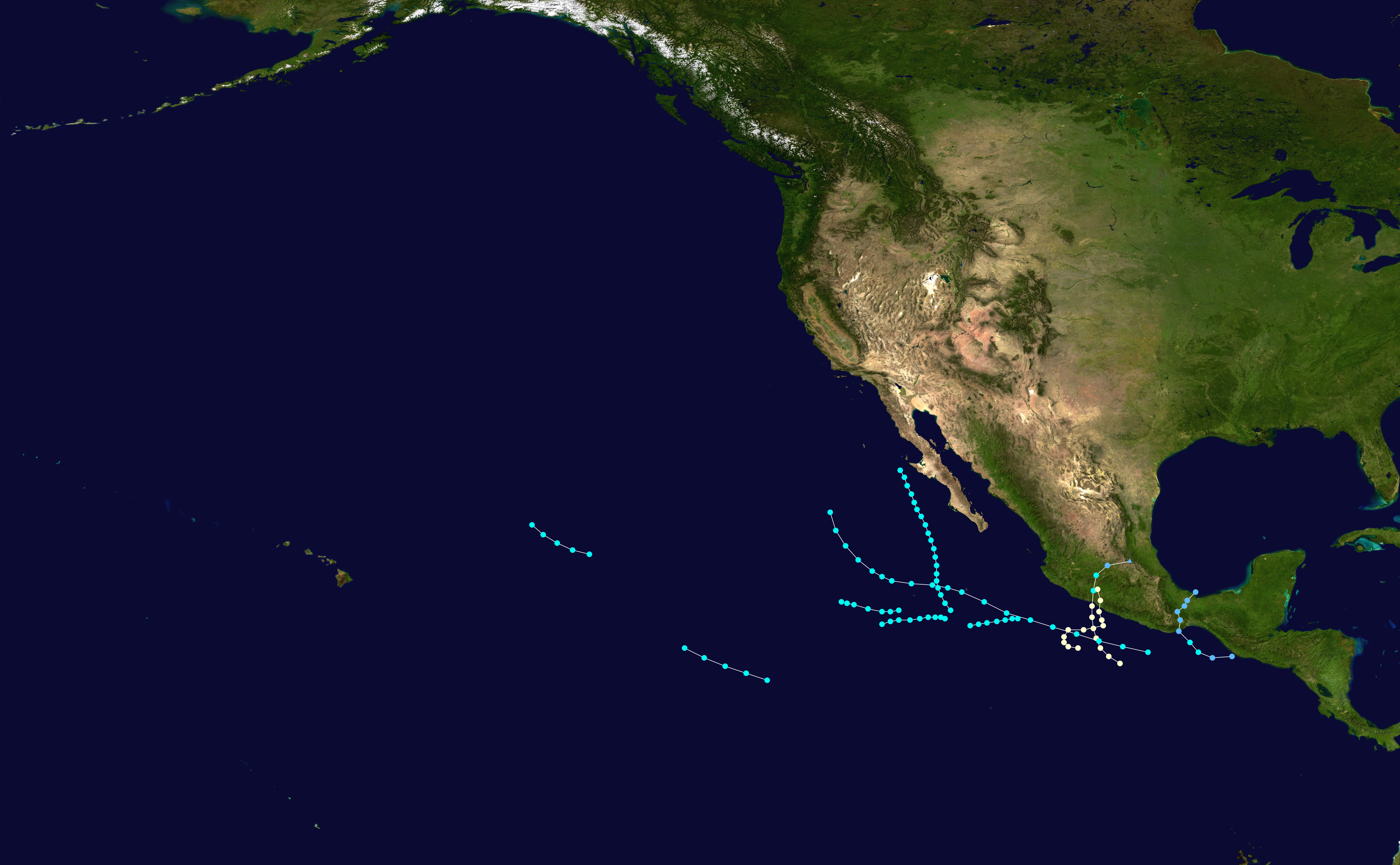
- Season summary map

Seasonal boundaries
- First system formed: June 9, 1961
- Last system dissipated: November 12, 1961

Strongest storm
- Name: Iva
  - Maximum winds: 85 mph (140 km/h) (1-minute sustained)
  - Lowest pressure: 984 mbar (hPa; 29.06 inHg)

Seasonal statistics
- Total depressions: 10
- Total storms: 9
- Hurricanes: 2
- Major hurricanes (Cat. 3+): 0
- Total fatalities: 436 total
- Total damage: $16 million (1961 USD)

Related articles
- 1961 Atlantic hurricane season; 1961 Pacific typhoon season; 1961 North Indian Ocean cyclone season

The 1961 Pacific hurricane season was an event in meteorology. It officially started on May 15, 1961, in the eastern Pacific and lasted until November 30, 1961. Ten tropical cyclones, 9 named storms (Madeline and Simone were operationally considered a tropical storm) and two hurricanes formed during the 1961 season, none of the hurricanes reached beyond category 1 status on the Saffir-Simpson Hurricane Scale.

The 1961 Pacific hurricane season featured only one notable tropical cyclone: Hurricane Tara. Tara devastated southwest Mexico, causing 436–500 fatalities, making it the fourth deadliest tropical cyclone in the Eastern Pacific basin.

== Season summary ==
The 1961 Pacific hurricane season was slightly more active than 1960, which had eight tropical cyclones, compare with 11 during this year. However, in 1960, there were five hurricane, but only two in 1961. Although there were an abnormally high number of tropical cyclones for its time, 1961 fell below the 1995-2008 average number of tropical cyclones, which is 15 tropical cyclones, 9 hurricanes, and 4 major hurricanes. In addition, there were eleven tropical cyclones, two hurricanes, but no major hurricanes. However, in post-analysis, it was noted that "Tropical Storm Madeline" was only a tropical depression, and shouldn't have been named.

Tropical cyclone activity first began about a month after the official start of the season, with Iva developed on June 9. After Iva dissipated on June 11, there was another period of lack of tropical cyclogenesis for almost a month, ending after Tropical Storm Joanne developed on July 10. July was an active month, with four tropical cyclones developing. However, the month of August and September combined featured only two tropical cyclones. After September, there were two tropical cyclones in October, both existing only on October 3 and October 4. Two more tropical cyclones developed in November, which was the first time on record, and would not occur again until 2006.

Operationally, the San Francisco Weather Bureau issued advisories for Tropical Storm Simone, which existed in early November south of Mexico. The system originated from the remnants of Atlantic Hurricane Hattie, crossing into the basin on November 1; on the same day, the system was named Simone. The system consisted of a broad circulation with gale force winds, which the Atlantic hurricane reanalysis committee referred as a Central American gyre; as it lacked a well-defined center, the system was removed as a tropical cyclone in 2019. The gyre intensified before moving ashore Mexico on November 3, whereupon it dissipated.

== Systems ==
=== Hurricane Iva ===
- Category 1 hurricane (SSHWS)
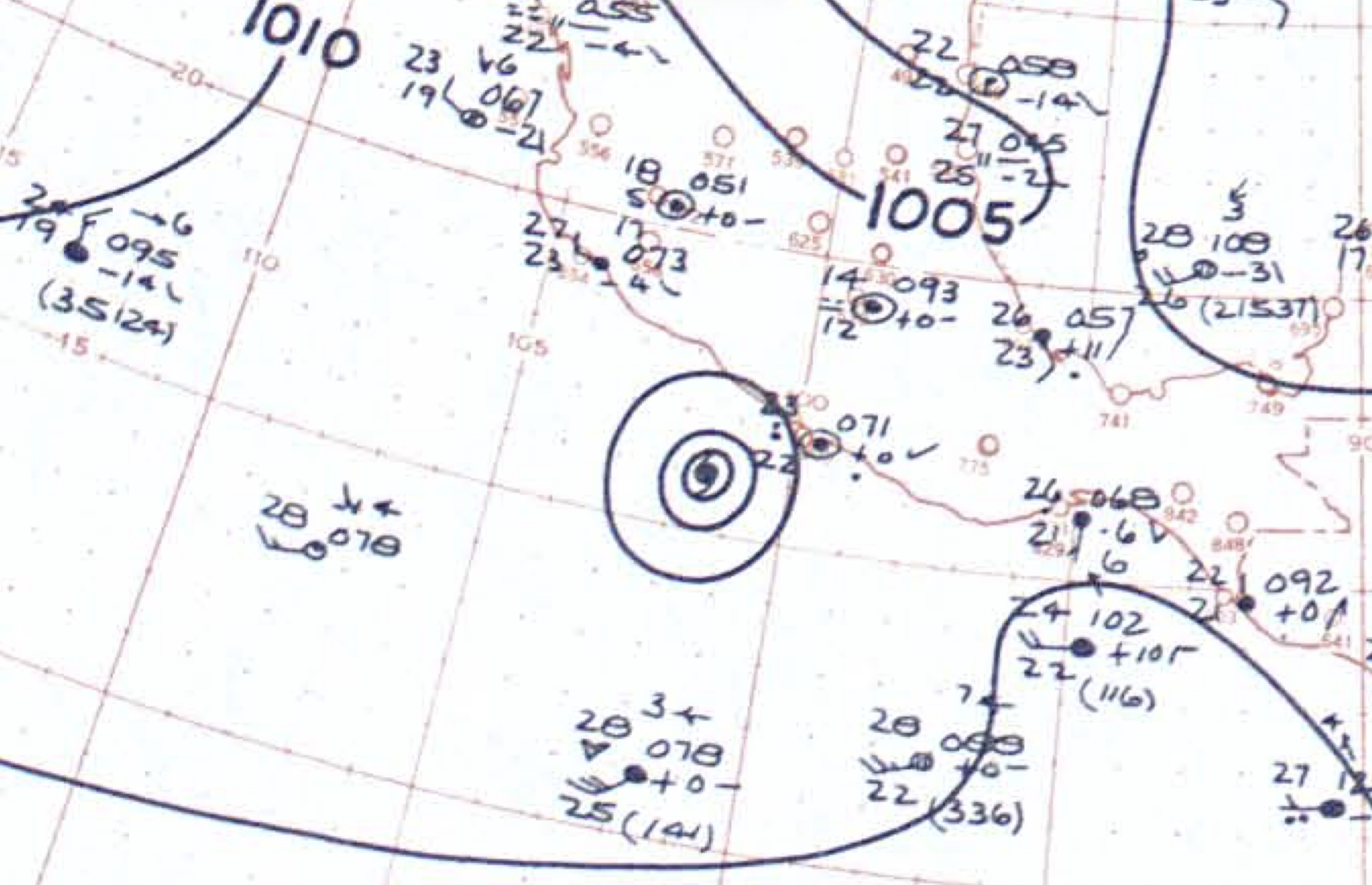
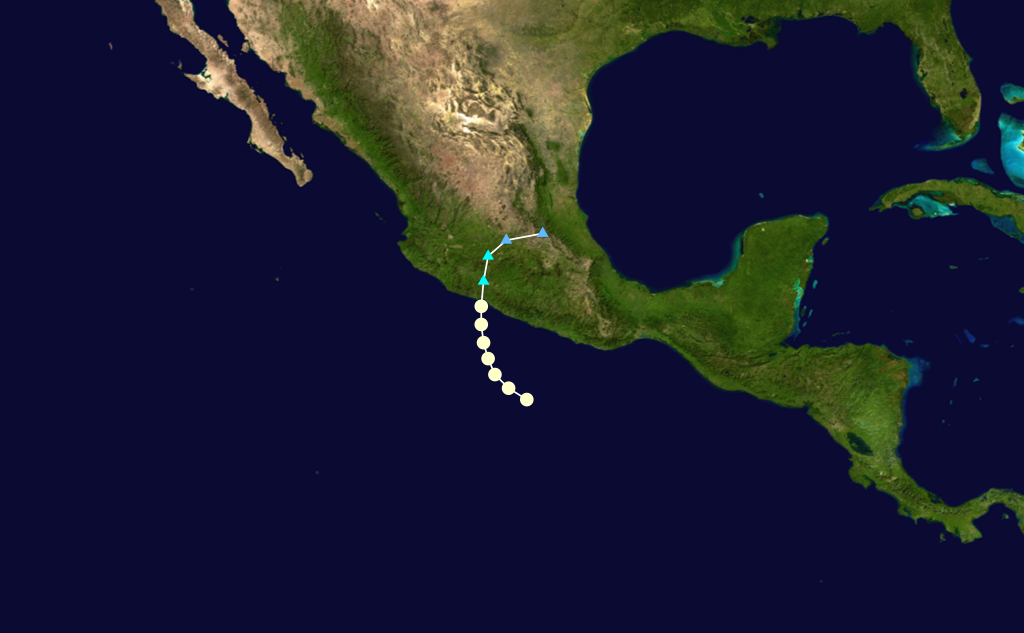
- Duration: June 9 – June 11
- Peak intensity: 85 mph (140 km/h) (1-min); 984 mbar (hPa)

Hurricane Iva was the first storm of the season, as the Eastern Pacific continued through the name lists regardless of the year. Iva was first observed on June 9 280 mi (420.61 km/h) southwest of Puerto Ángel. The storm slowly curved northward, and Iva did not intensify past its peak with winds of 85 mph (140 km/h). By June 11, Iva made landfall near Zihuatanejo, Guerrero, Mexico at the same intensity. Iva transitioned into an extratropical cyclone less than six hours later, and the remnants completely dissipated on June 12.

=== Tropical Storm Joanne ===
- Tropical storm (SSHWS)
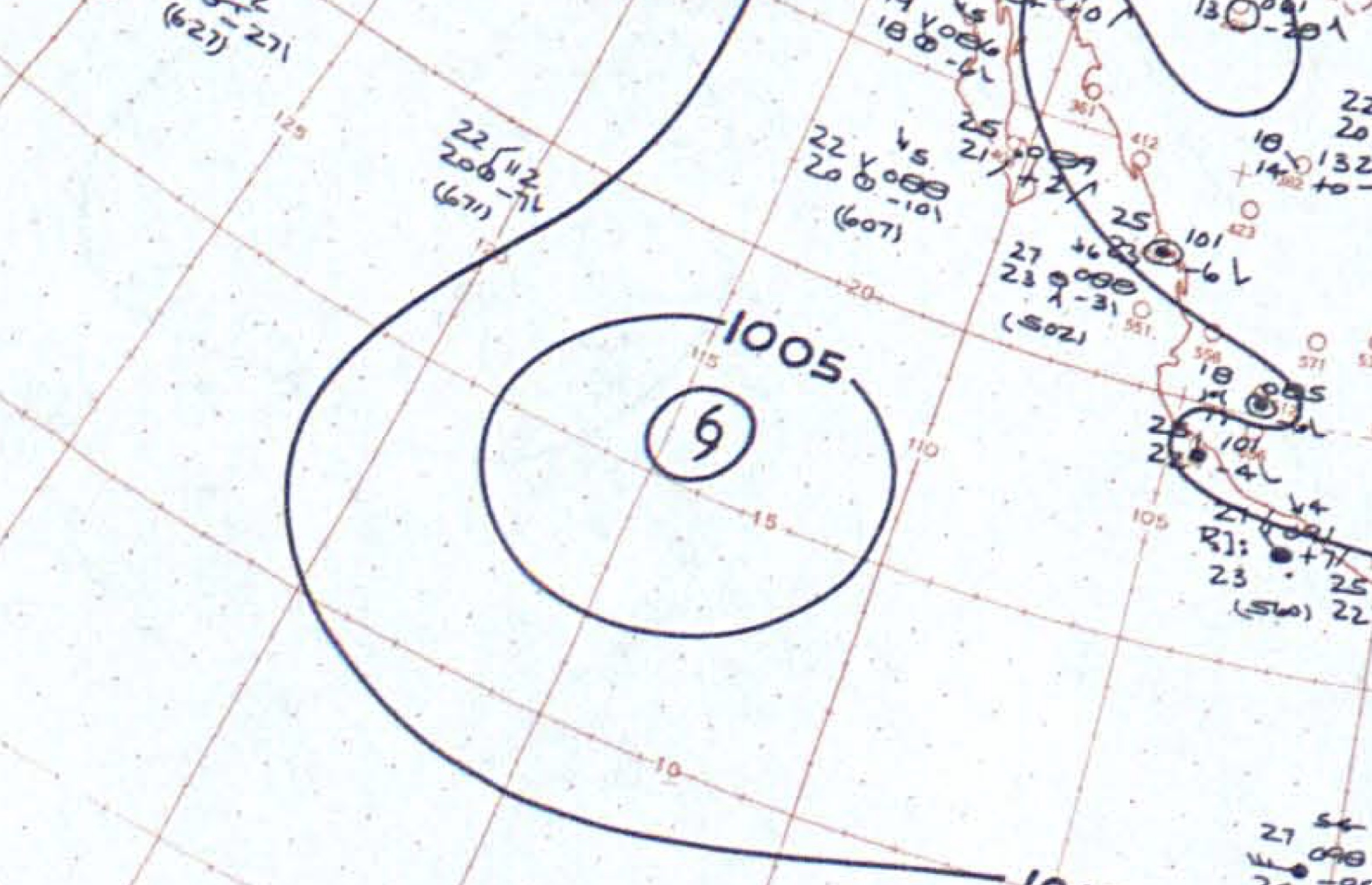
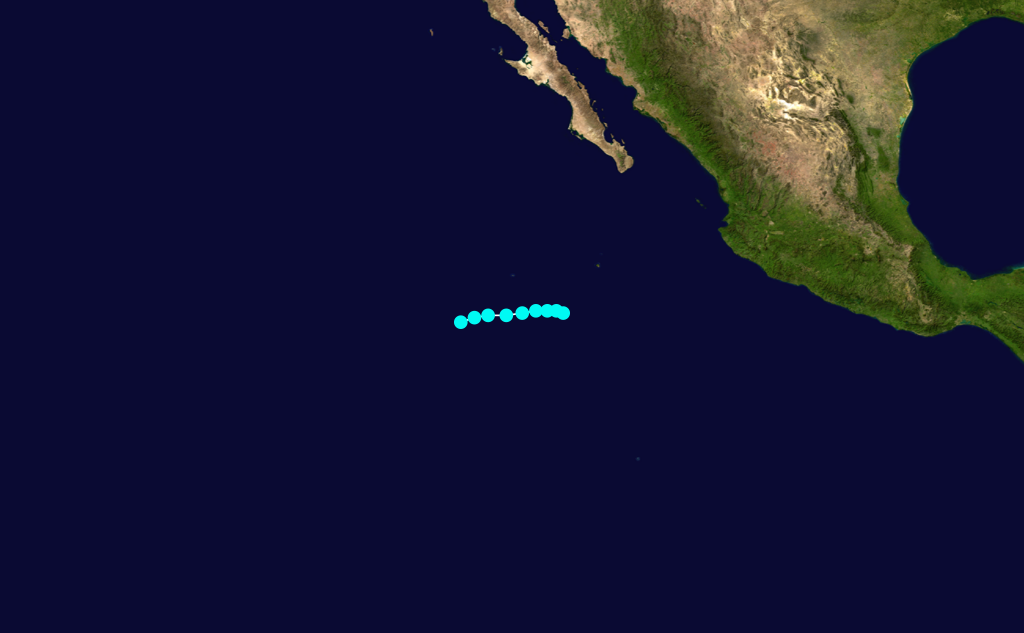
- Duration: July 10 – July 12
- Peak intensity: 50 mph (85 km/h) (1-min); 995 mbar (hPa)

Tropical Storm Joanne developed on July 10 175 mi (281.63 km) southwest of Socorro Island. Winds were at 50 mph (80 km/h) upon development, and no further intensification would occur while Joanne headed generally westward. Joanne dissipated two days later 883 mi (1421 km/h) south-southeast of Guadalupe Island.

=== Tropical Storm Kathleen ===
- Tropical storm (SSHWS)
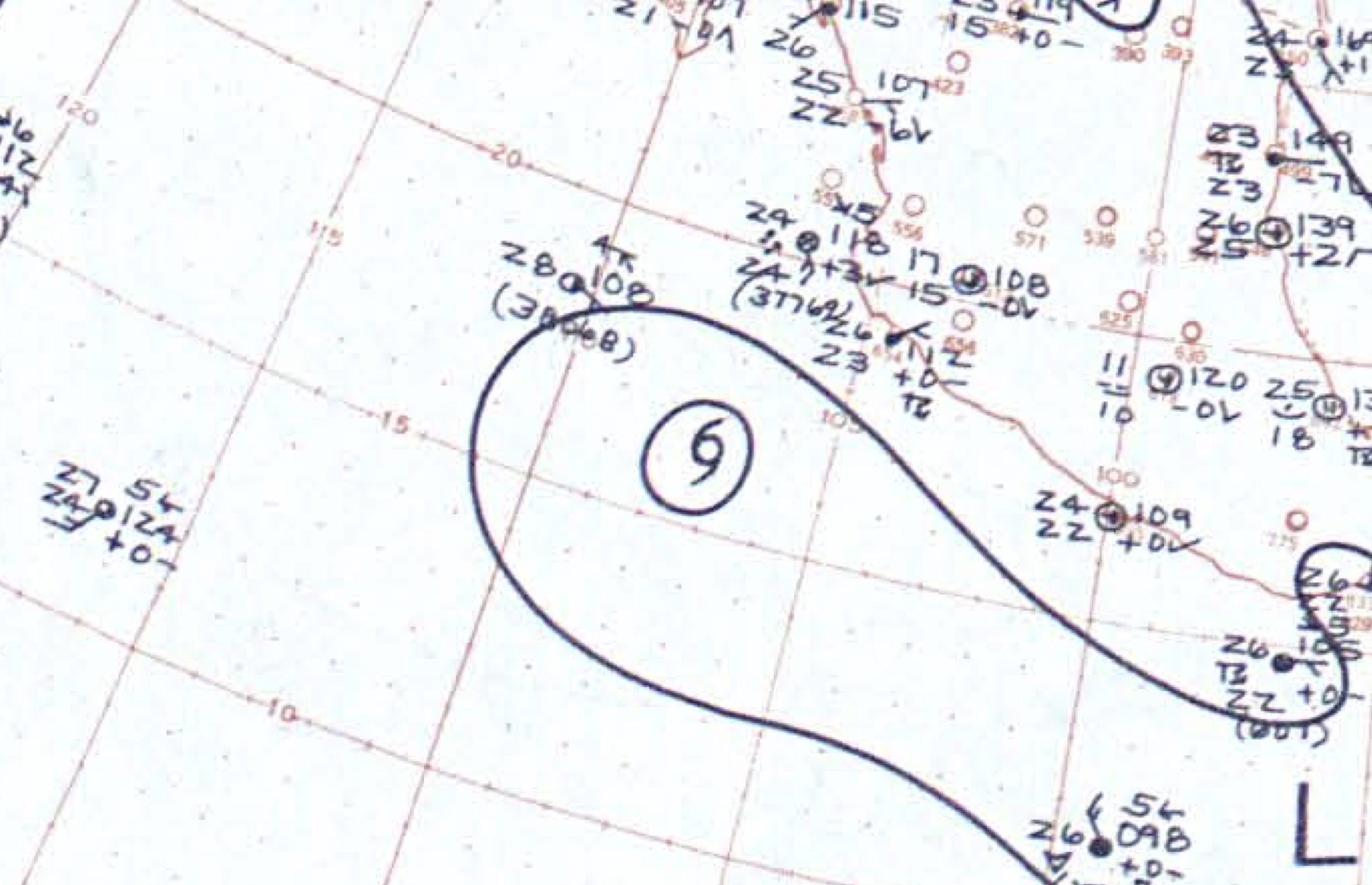
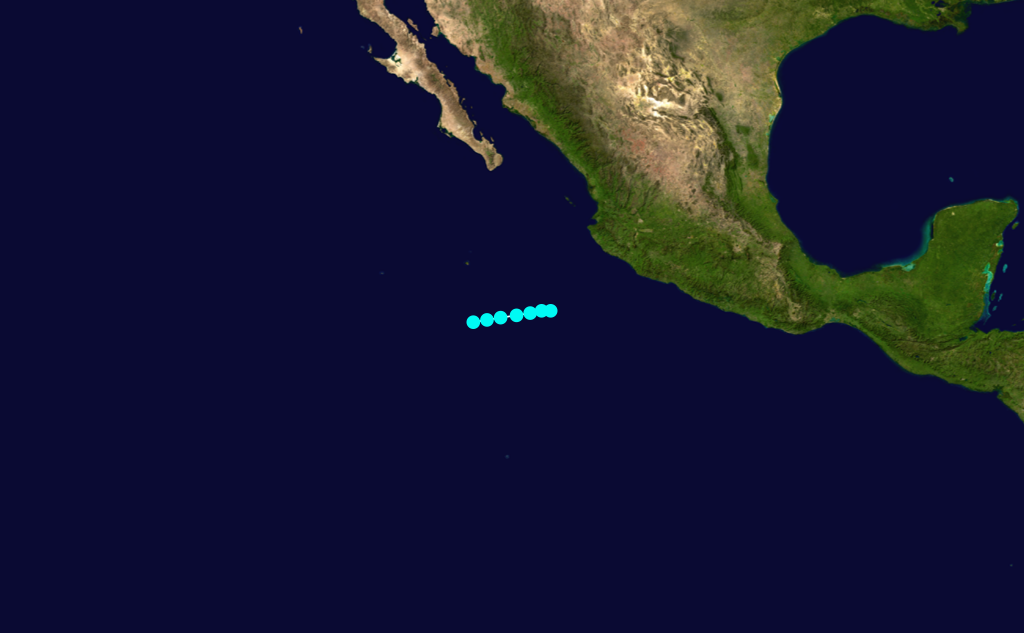
- Duration: July 14 – July 16
- Peak intensity: 50 mph (85 km/h) (1-min); 1002 mbar (hPa)

Tropical Storm Kathleen developed on July 14 in a similar location to Tropical Storm Joanne. Kathleen headed west-southwestward and did not intensify past 50 mph (85 km/h). By July 16, Kathleen dissipated.

=== Tropical Storm Liza ===
- Tropical storm (SSHWS)
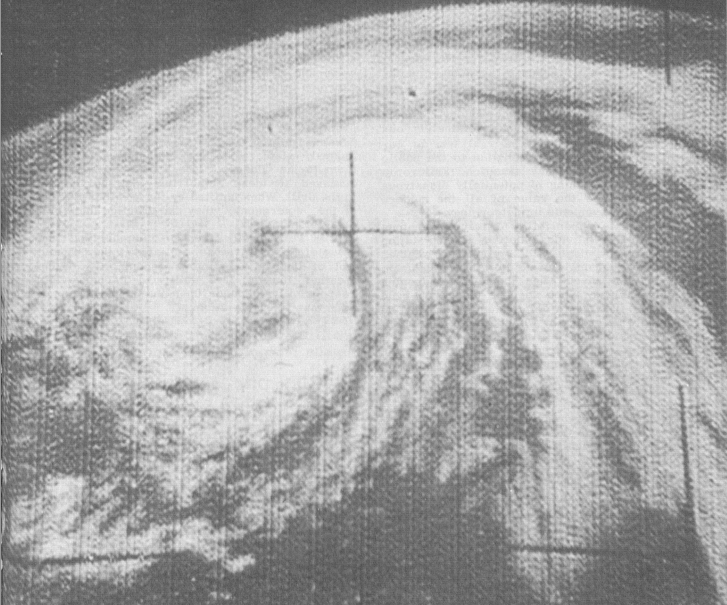
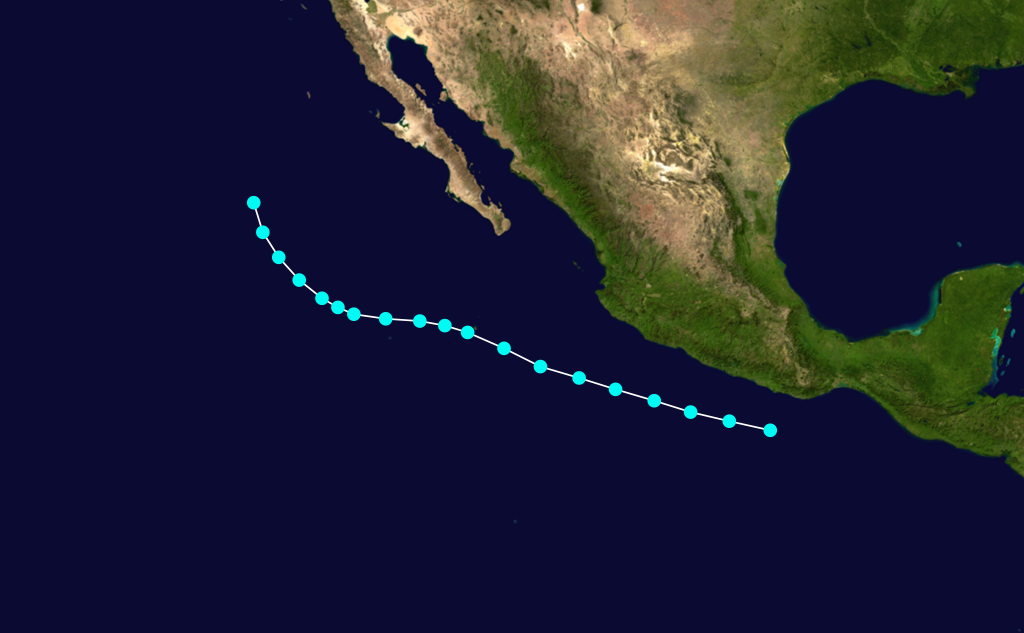
- Duration: July 15 – July 19
- Peak intensity: 50 mph (85 km/h) (1-min); 1005 mbar (hPa)

Tropical Storm Liza stayed at sea.

=== Tropical Depression Madeline ===
- Tropical depression (SSHWS)
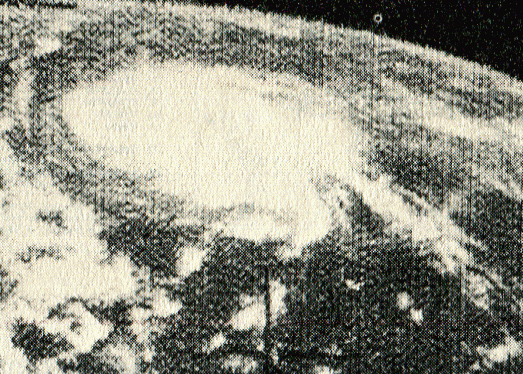
- Duration: July 24 – July 25
- Peak intensity: 35 mph (55 km/h) (1-min); 1000 mbar (hPa)

Tropical Depression Madeline stayed at sea and downgraded during post-analysis.

=== Tropical Storm Naomi ===
- Tropical storm (SSHWS)
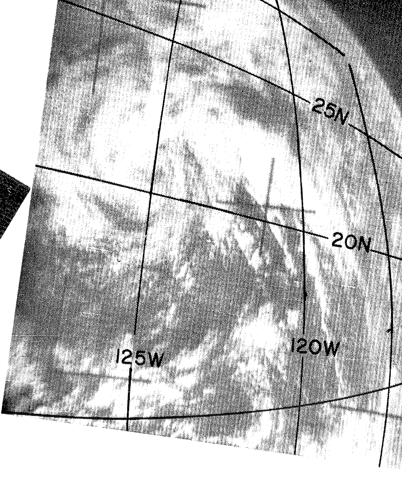
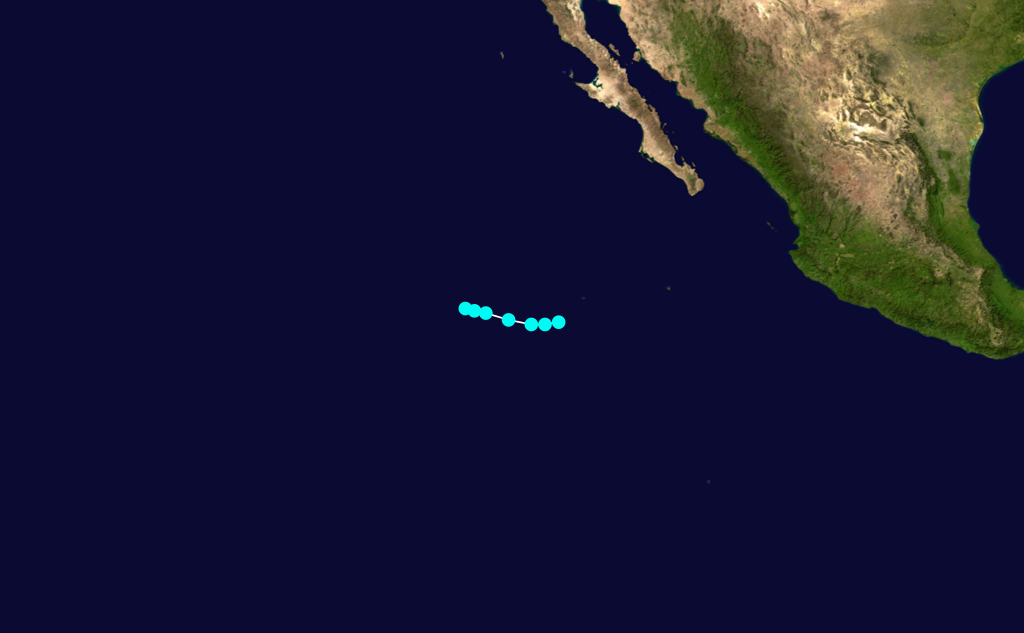
- Duration: August 4 – August 5
- Peak intensity: 50 mph (85 km/h) (1-min); 1000 mbar (hPa)

Tropical Storm Naomi stayed at sea.

=== Tropical Storm Orla ===
- Tropical storm (SSHWS)
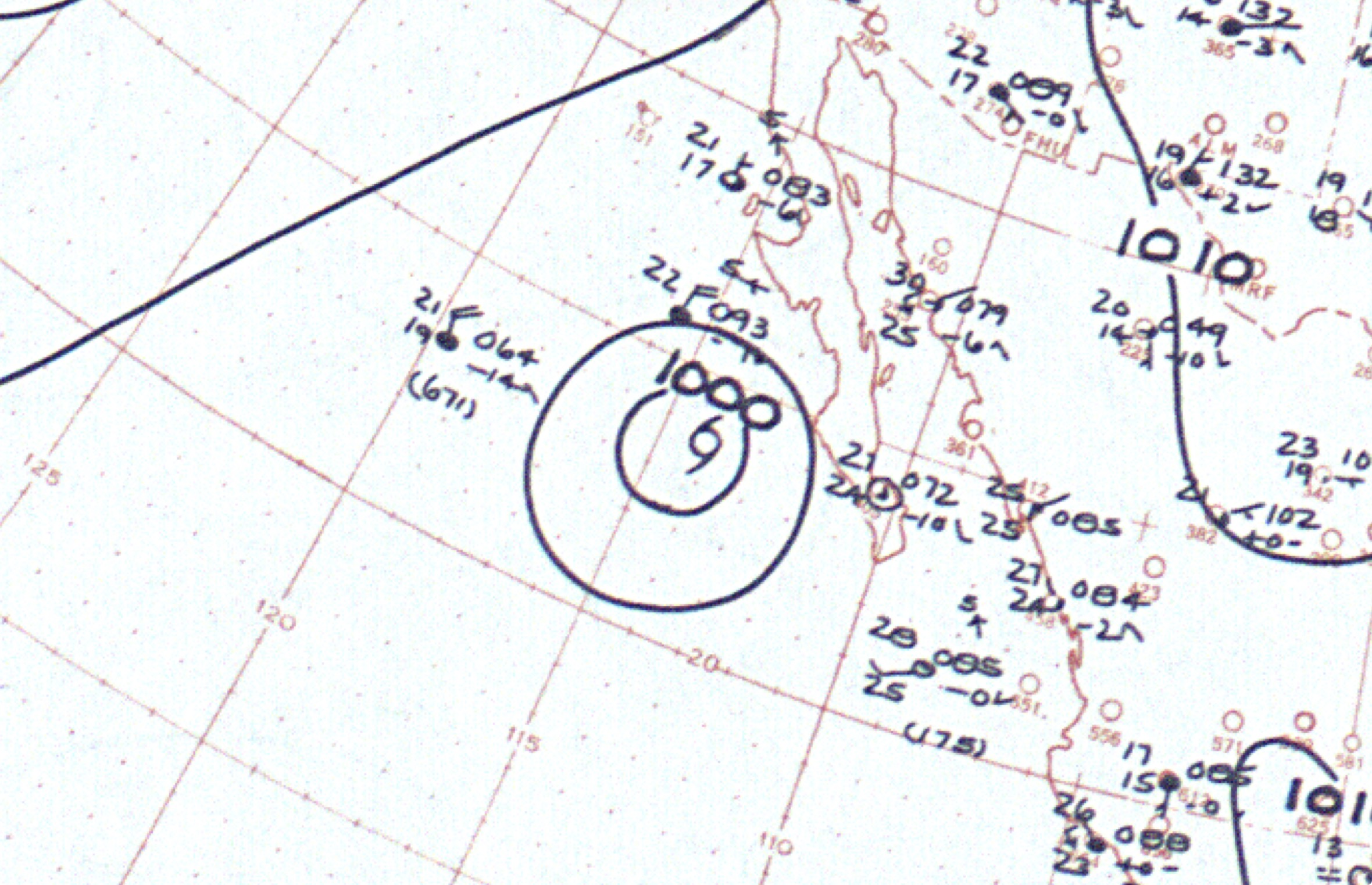
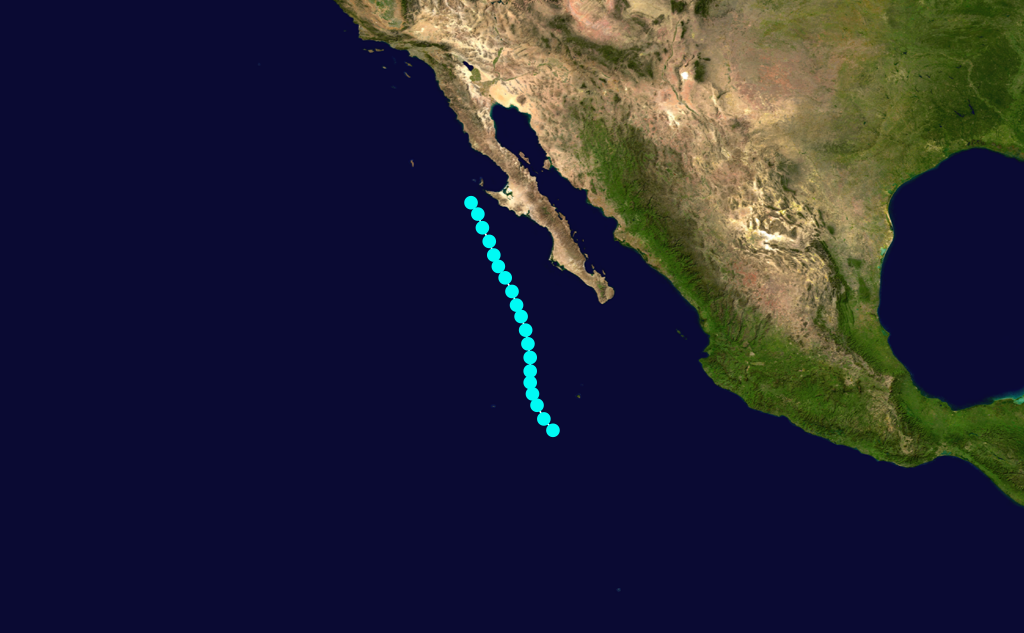
- Duration: September 6 – September 11
- Peak intensity: 50 mph (85 km/h) (1-min); 998 mbar (hPa)

Tropical Storm Orla came close to the Baja California Peninsula, but stayed at sea.

=== Tropical Storm Pauline ===
- Tropical storm (SSHWS)
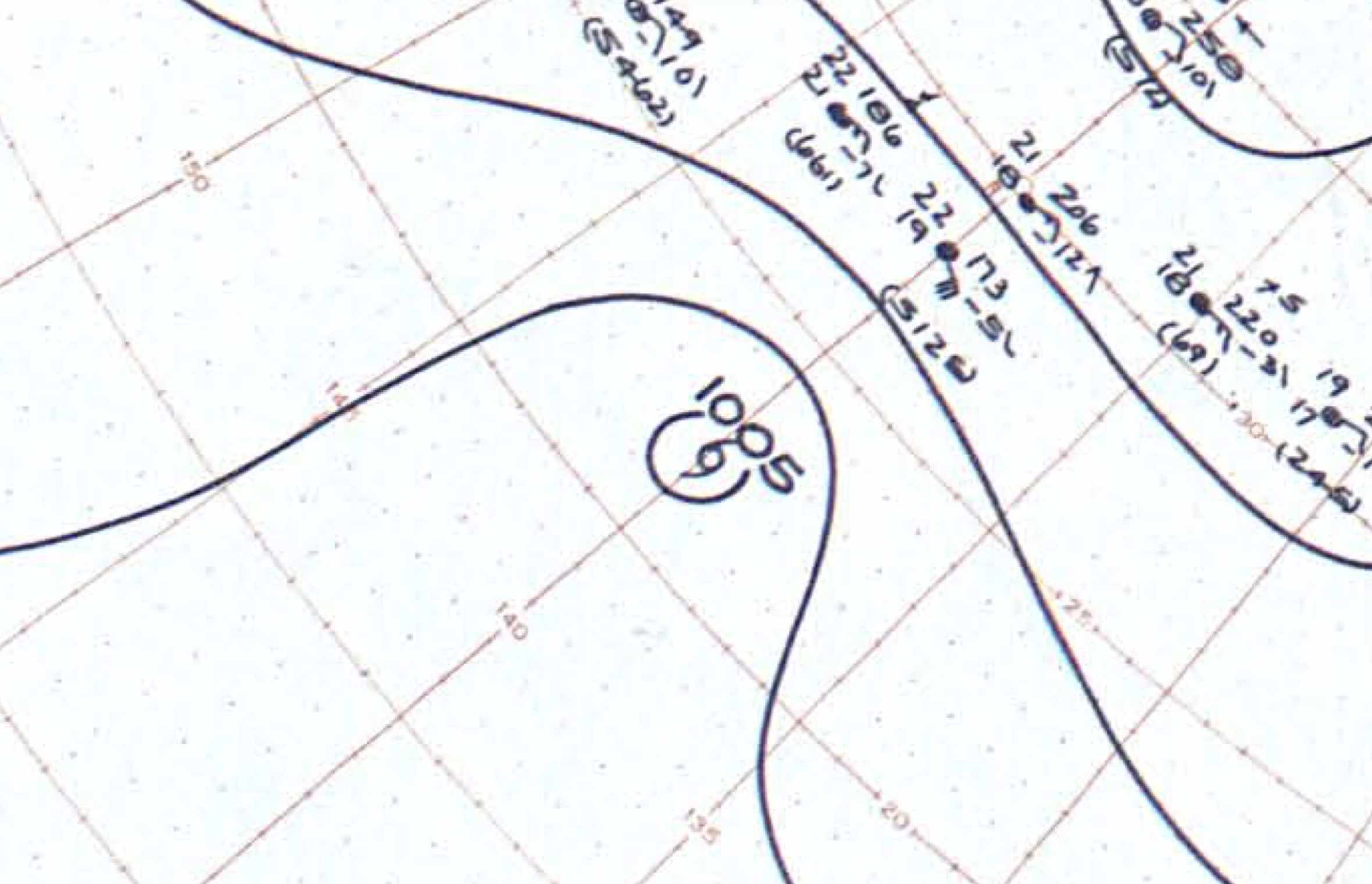
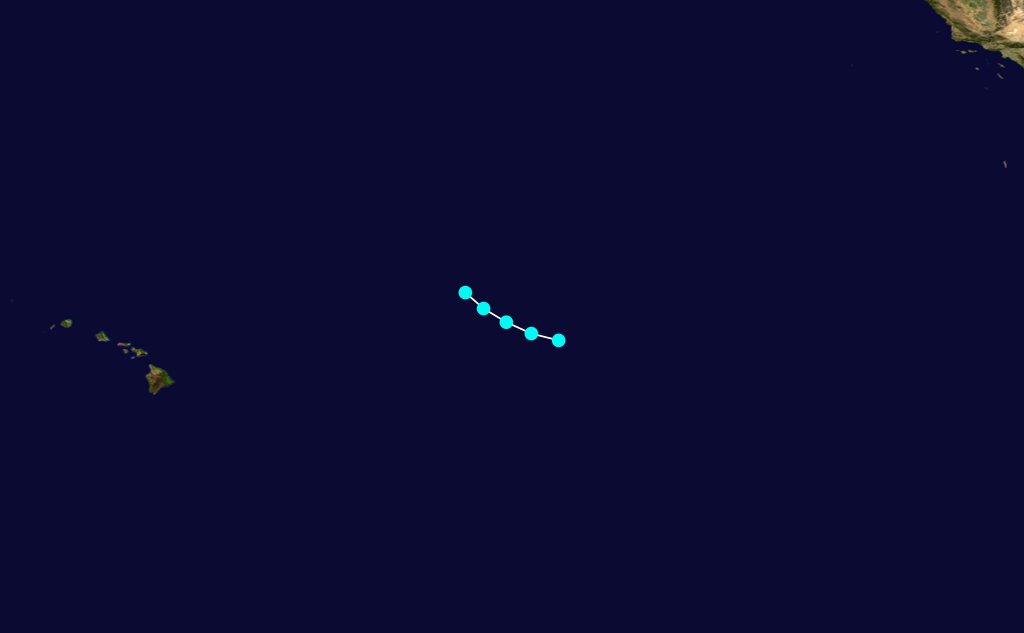
- Duration: October 3 – October 4
- Peak intensity: 50 mph (85 km/h) (1-min); 1010 mbar (hPa)

Tropical Storm Pauline stayed at sea.

=== Tropical Storm Rebecca ===
- Tropical storm (SSHWS)
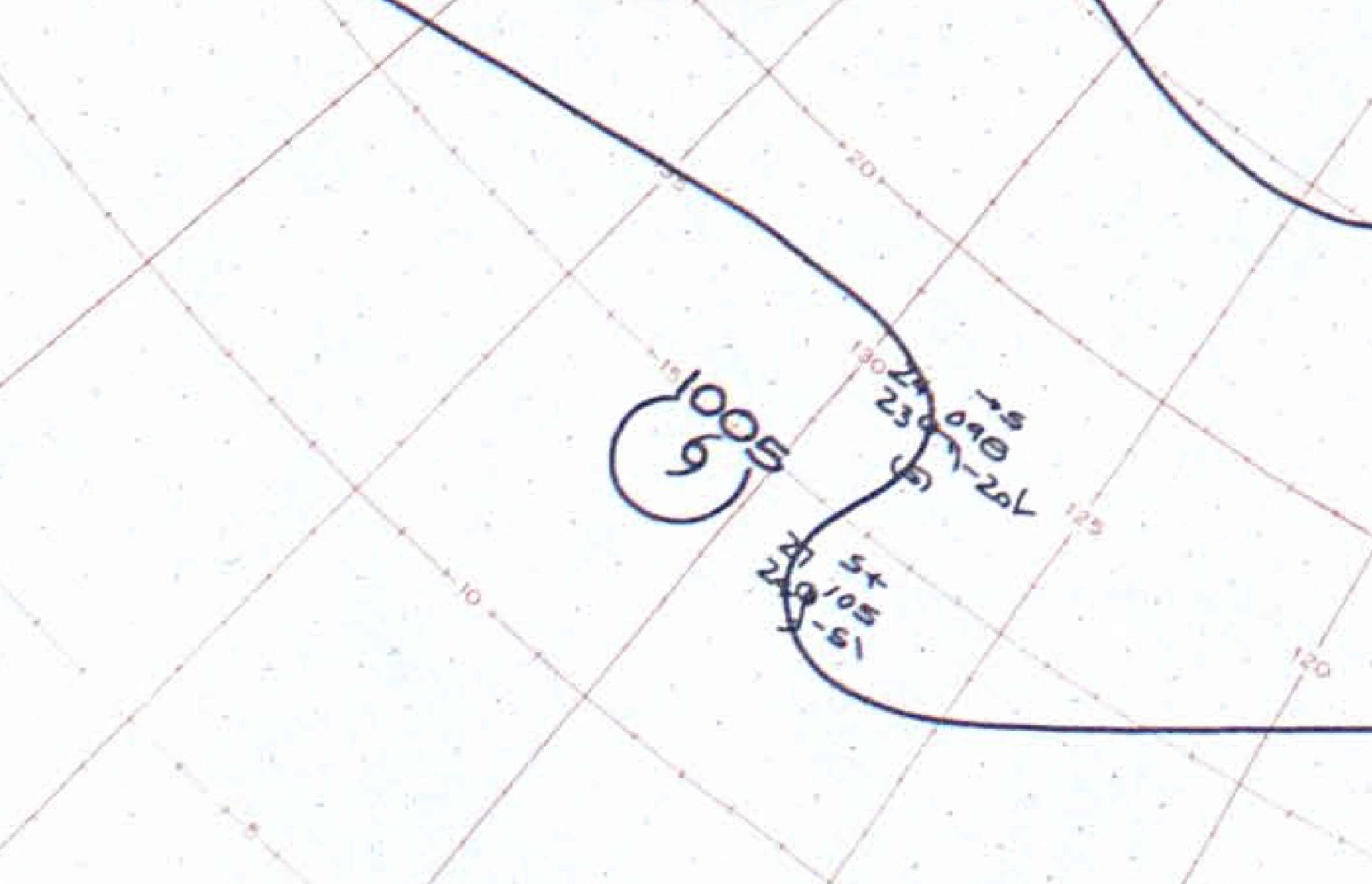
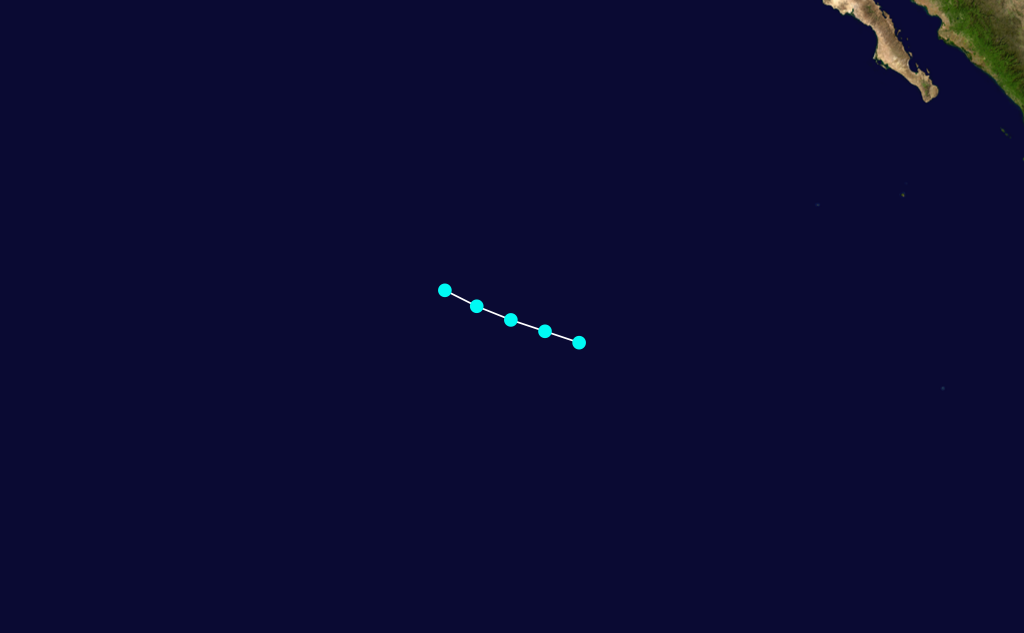
- Duration: October 3 – October 4
- Peak intensity: 50 mph (85 km/h) (1-min); 1008 mbar (hPa)

Tropical Storm Rebecca stayed at sea.

=== Hurricane Tara ===
- Category 1 hurricane (SSHWS)
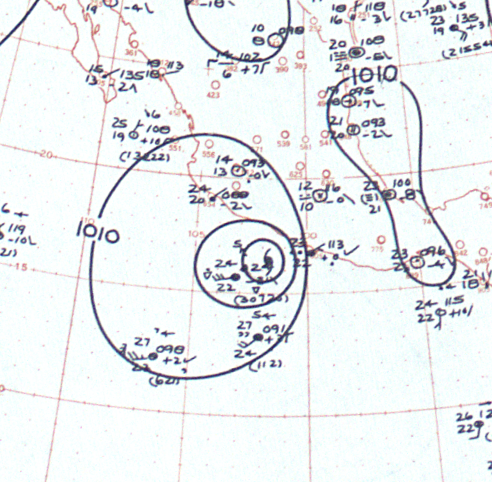
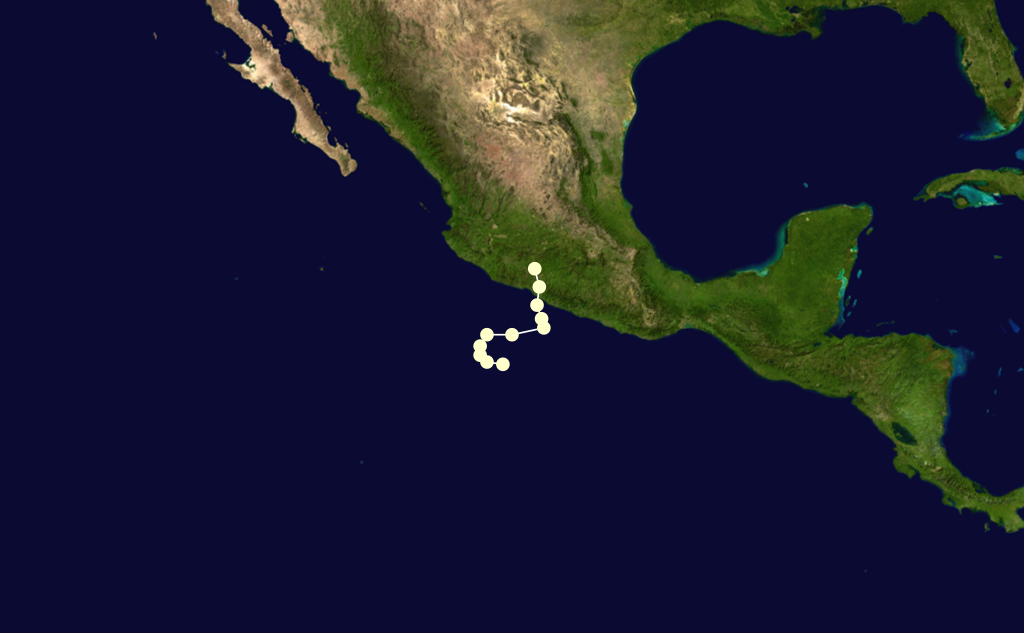
- Duration: November 10 – November 12
- Peak intensity: 85 mph (140 km/h) (1-min); 996 mbar (hPa)

Hurricane Tara was one of the deadliest Pacific hurricanes on record. It was the final storm of the season, forming on November 10 about 230 mi (365 km) off the coast of Mexico. It strengthened to reach 85 mph (140 km/h) before making landfall in the Mexican state of Guerrero near Zihuatanejo. Hurricane Tara dissipated on November 12, bringing heavy rainfall and strong winds to locations inundated by 10 days of precipitation. Damage was light in the major port city of Acapulco, though further west along the coast, the effects of Tara were much worse. The city of Nuxco in the municipality of Tecpan de Galeana received the most damage and deaths from the hurricane. Throughout Mexico, at least 436 fatalities were reported, and damage exceeded $16 million (1961 USD).

== Storm names ==
The following names were used for tropical storms that formed in the North Pacific Ocean east of 140°W during 1961. The names came from a series of four rotating lists. Names were used one after the other without regard to year, and when the bottom of one list was reached, the next named storm received the name at the top of the next list.

- Iva
- Joanne
- Kathleen
- Liza
- Madeline
- Naomi
- Orla
- Pauline
- Rebecca
- Simone (Note: Simone was operationally considered a tropical storm, but was removed as a tropical cyclone following HURDAT reanalysis in 2019.)
- Tara

Had any tropical storms formed in the North Pacific between 140°W and the International Date Line in 1961, their names would have been drawn from the Western Pacific typhoon naming list.

== See also ==
- Tropical cyclone
- List of Pacific hurricanes
- 1961 Atlantic hurricane season
- 1961 Pacific typhoon season
- 1961 North Indian Ocean cyclone season
- Australian region cyclone seasons: 1960–61 1961–62
- South Pacific cyclone seasons: 1960–61 1961–62
- South-West Indian Ocean cyclone seasons: 1960–61 1961–62
