= 1966 Atlantic hurricane season =

- Season summary map

Seasonal boundaries
- First system formed: June 4, 1966
- Last system dissipated: November 26, 1966

Strongest storm
- Name: Inez
  - Maximum winds: 160 mph (260 km/h) (1-minute sustained)
  - Lowest pressure: 927 mbar (hPa; 27.37 inHg)

Seasonal statistics
- Total depressions: 17
- Total storms: 15
- Hurricanes: 7
- Major hurricanes (Cat. 3+): 3
- Total fatalities: 1,094 total
- Total damage: $432.6 million (1966 USD)

Related articles
- 1966 Pacific hurricane season; 1966 Pacific typhoon season; 1966 North Indian Ocean cyclone season

The 1966 Atlantic hurricane season saw the Weather Bureau office in Miami, Florida, be designated as the National Hurricane Center (NHC) and assume responsibility of tropical cyclone forecasting in the basin. The season officially began on June 1, and lasted until November 30. These dates conventionally delimit the period of each year when most tropical cyclones form in the Atlantic basin. It was an above-average season in terms of tropical storms, with a total of 15. The first system, Hurricane Alma, developed over eastern Nicaragua on June 4 and became a rare major hurricane in the month of June. Alma brought severe flooding to Honduras and later to Cuba, but caused relatively minor impact in the Southeastern United States. Alma resulted in 90 deaths and about $210 million (1966 USD) (Note: All damage figures are in 1966 USD, unless otherwise noted) in damage.

The unnamed June tropical storm and Becky, Celia, Dorothy, and Ella all resulted in little to no impact on land. The next system, Hurricane Faith, developed near Cape Verde on August 21. It tracked westward across the Atlantic Ocean until north of Hispaniola. After paralleling the East Coast of the United States, Faith moved northeastward across the open Atlantic and later became extratropical on September 4. Although it never made landfall, Faith and its remnants generated rough seas that resulted in four deaths, with one over the open Atlantic and the other four offshore Denmark. The two next tropical storms – Greta and Hallie – caused negligible impact.

The strongest tropical cyclone of the season was Hurricane Inez, a powerful Category 5 hurricane that devastated a large majority of the Caribbean, the Florida Keys, and parts of Mexico. Throughout its path, the storm caused about $222.5 million in damage and more than 1,000 deaths. Following Inez, the other cyclones reaching at least tropical storm intensity, Judith, Kendra, Lois, and two unnamed systems in November did not result in significant impacts on land. The final system, an unnamed tropical storm, degenerated into a trough over the western Atlantic on November 26.

== Season summary ==
The Atlantic hurricane season officially began on June 1. During the year, the Miami, Florida, Weather Bureau office was re-designated the National Hurricane Center. It was an above average season in which fifteen tropical storms formed, compared with the 1966–2009 average of 11.3 named storms. Seven of these reached hurricane status, slightly above of the 1966–2009 average of 6.2, and three of those reached major hurricane status, (Note: A major hurricane is a storm that ranks as Category 3 or higher on the Saffir–Simpson hurricane wind scale.) with the 1950–2000 mean being 2.3. In all, three hurricanes and one tropical storm made landfall in 1966. Also, collectively, the season's storms caused at least 1,094 fatalities and about $432.6 million (1966 USD) in damage. The season officially ended on November 30.

The first storm, Hurricane Alma, developed over eastern Nicaragua on June 4. Alma crossed the Caribbean and struck Cuba. The storm made another landfall in Florida as a hurricane on June 9. This marked the earliest United States hurricane landfall since a hurricane in May and June of 1825. Alma continued northeastward across the Southeastern United States until becoming extratropical offshore Virginia on June 13. Later that month, another tropical depression developed. The month of July was highly active, with four named storms – Becky, Celia, Dorothy, and Ella. Additionally, a tropical depression developed in the Gulf of Mexico. However, tropical cyclogenesis then halted for more than three weeks, until Hurricane Faith developed on August 21. On average, three or four named storms form in August.

Four tropical cyclones developed in September, including tropical storms Greta, Hallie and Judith, as well as Hurricane Inez. Peaking as a Category 5 hurricane on the Saffir–Simpson hurricane wind scale with winds of 165 mph (270 km/h), Inez was the strongest tropical cyclone of the season. Although Inez persisted into October, no other system developed that month. Two named storms usually form in October. The final formally named storm, Hurricane Lois, existed from November 4 to November 11.

The season's activity was reflected with an accumulated cyclone energy (ACE) rating of 145. ACE is, broadly speaking, a measure of the power of the hurricane multiplied by the length of time it existed, so storms that last a long time, as well as particularly strong hurricanes, have high ACEs. It is only calculated for full advisories on tropical systems at or exceeding 39 mph (63 km/h), which is tropical storm strength.

== Systems ==
=== Hurricane Alma ===
- Category 3 hurricane (SSHWS)
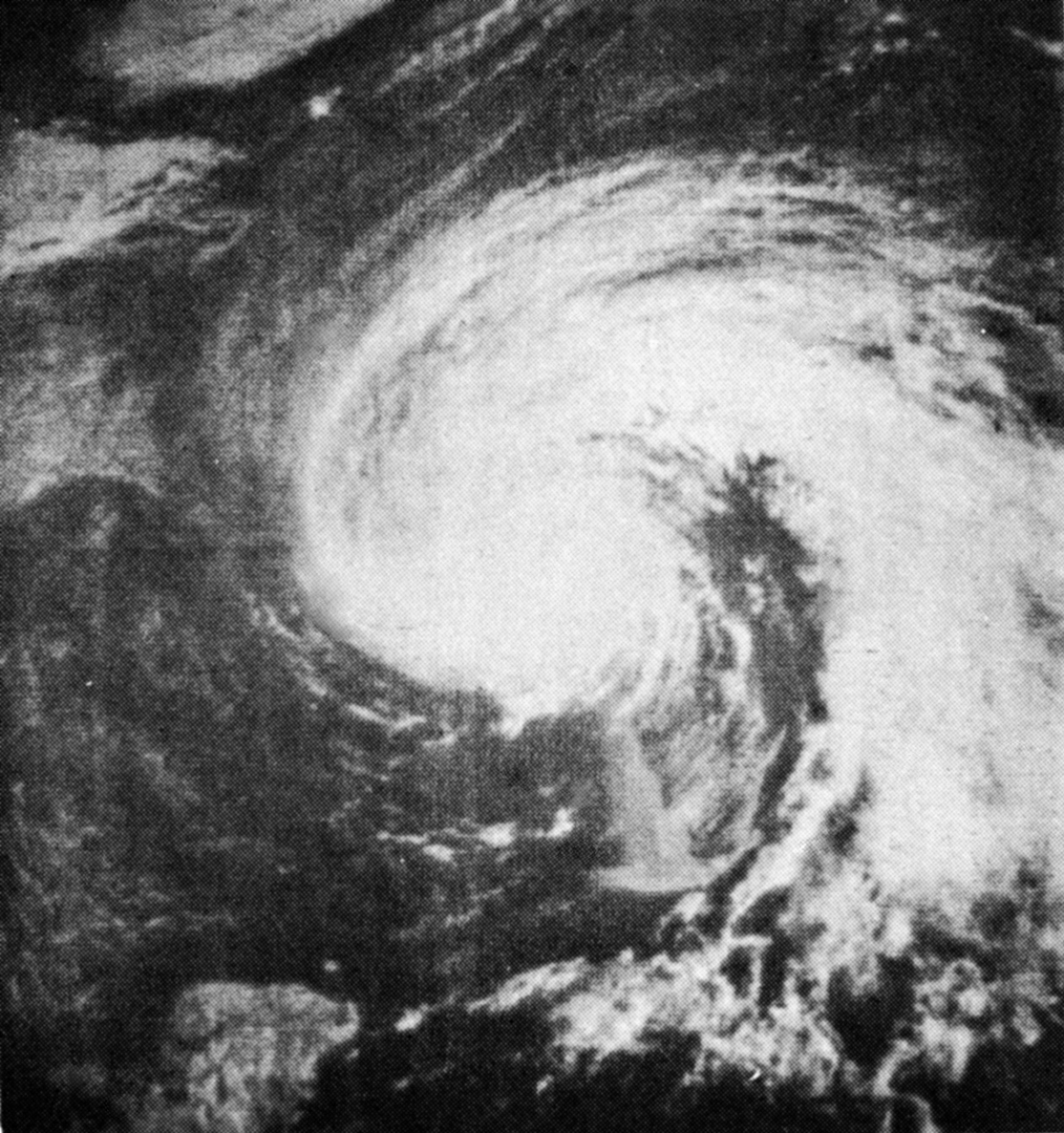
- Duration: June 4 – June 12
- Peak intensity: 115 mph (185 km/h) (1-min); 970 mbar (hPa)

A westward-moving tropical wave crossed the Caribbean Sea and reached Central America in early June. Land interaction initially slowed development. However, after the wave turned northward and reemerged into the Caribbean, it quickly organized into a tropical depression at 12:00 UTC on June 5. While moving through Honduras, the precursor system dropped heavy rainfall that killed at least 73 people in the city of San Rafael. Offshore northern Honduras, the system produced heavy rainfall on Swan Island. The depression moved north-northeastward and intensified into Tropical Storm Alma around 00:00 UTC on June 6, about 18 hours before becoming a hurricane. After strengthening into a Category 2 hurricane on June 8, Alma made two landfalls in Cuba, first on Isla de la Juventud with winds of 100 mph (160 km/h) and then near Guanimar, Artemisa Province, at a slightly stronger intensity. Havana observed wind gusts up to 109 mph (175 km/h). The hurricane caused heavy crop damage and water shortages. Over 1,000 houses were destroyed, and damage was estimated at $200 million. The storm killed 12 people in the country.

After emerging into the Straights of Florida around 13:00 UTC on June 8, Alma continued to intensify and reached major hurricane intensity five hours later. The storm then peaked as a Category 3 hurricane with maximum sustained winds of 115 mph (185 km/h) and a minimum barometric pressure of 970 mbar (29 inHg) as it passed between Dry Tortugas and Key West, Florida. The latter reported power outages and flooding. Alma dropped heavy rainfall and produced winds across most of Florida, which damaged crops and caused scattered power outages. The cyclone weakened to a Category 1 hurricane before moving ashore near St. Marks, Florida, late on June 9 with winds of 85 mph (137 km/h). This was the earliest date of landfall in the United States since 1825. Damage in Florida was estimated at $10 million, and there were six deaths in the state. Alma crossed southeastern Georgia as a tropical storm, damaging a few houses and causing light damage. The storm re-intensified into a hurricane over the western Atlantic Ocean around 12:00 UTC on June 11, and its outer rainbands dropped heavy precipitation in Wilmington, North Carolina. Alma encountered colder water temperatures and weakened back to tropical storm intensity late on the following day, shortly before transitioning into an extratropical cyclone east of the Outer Banks. The remnant extratropical storm was absorbed by a frontal boundary just offshore Massachusetts on June 14.

=== June tropical storm ===
- Tropical storm (SSHWS)
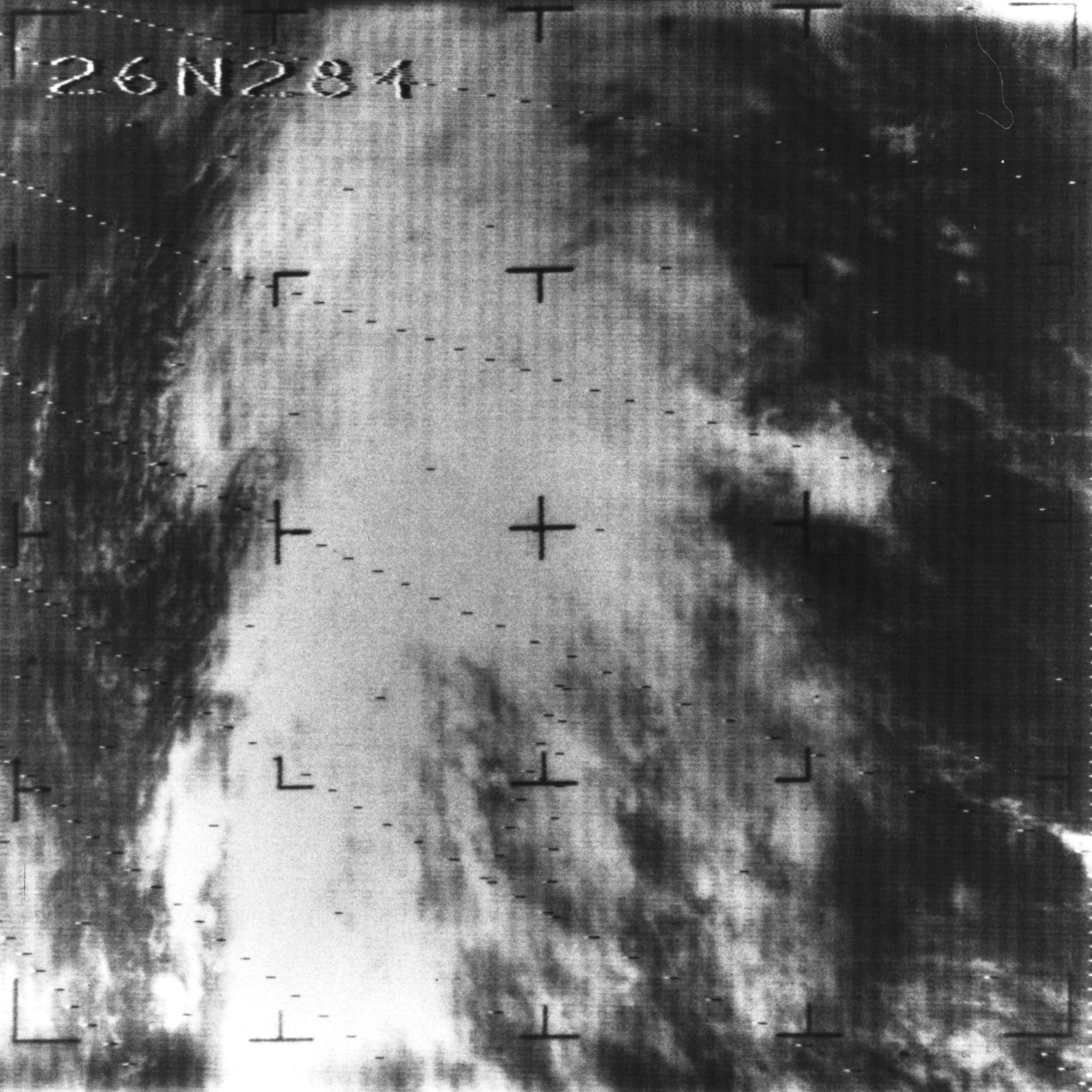
- Duration: June 28 – July 2
- Peak intensity: 45 mph (75 km/h) (1-min); 1004 mbar (hPa)

A strong tropical wave developed into a tropical depression in the northwestern Caribbean Sea on June 28. The depression moved slowly northward and although it remained poorly defined throughout its duration, the system intensified into a tropical storm early the following day. Also despite being described as poorly defined, the wind field was well organized, especially in the northeastern quadrant. Around 14:00 UTC on June 29, the storm made landfall on Cuba's south coast just west of the modern-day border of Artemisa and Mayabeque provinces with winds of 40 mph (64 km/h). The cyclone emerged into the Straights of Florida several hours later. Early on June 30, the system peaked with sustained winds of 45 mph (72 km/h) and a minimum pressure of 1,004 mbar (29.6 inHg) while approaching the Florida Keys. Continuing northward, the storm passed just west of the Tampa Bay area on July 1 before striking Cedar Key at 22:00 UTC with winds of 45 mph (72 km/h). The system curved northeastward and weakened to a tropical depression over southern Georgia at 06:00 UTC on July 2, about 12 hours before dissipating.

The storm spawned two tornadoes, one of which destroyed two aircraft at Palm Beach International Airport; the other touched down in Vero Beach and caused minimal effects. The storm dropped heavy rainfall in some areas of Florida, with a peak total of 10 in (250 mm) in Everglade City and Jacksonville. The precipitation in Jacksonville resulted in $50,000 in damage to roadways. Additionally, the cyclone brought "beneficial rains" to South Carolina.

=== Hurricane Becky ===
- Category 1 hurricane (SSHWS)
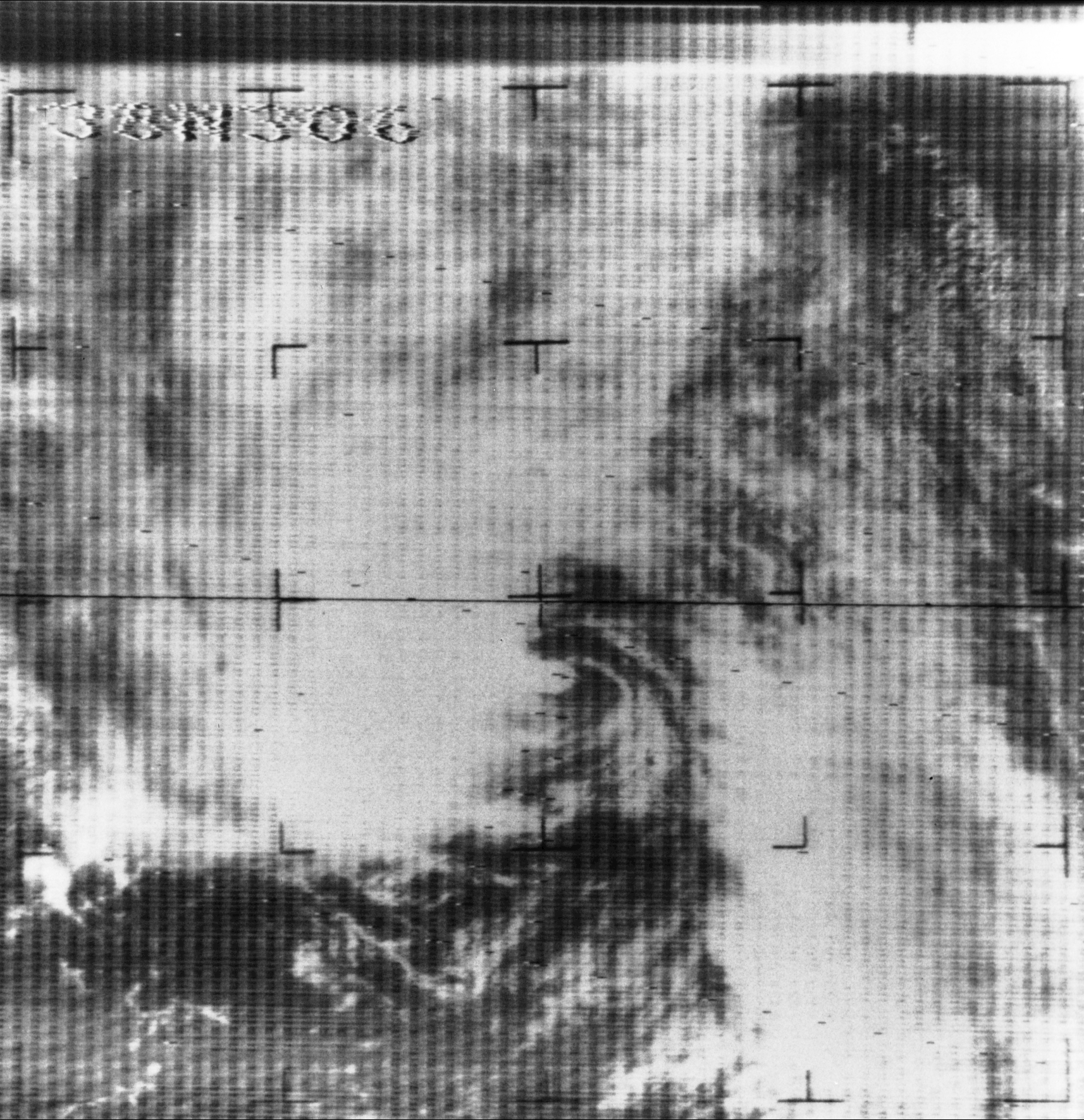
- Duration: June 30 – July 3
- Peak intensity: 85 mph (140 km/h) (1-min); 984 mbar (hPa)

In late June, a weakening frontal boundary and an upper-level trough traversed the western Atlantic. A significant convective flare occurred along the tail-end of the frontal system between the Bahamas and Bermuda on June 27. The frontal system also began interacting with the northern part of a westward-moving tropical wave over the Caribbean. After a well-defined center developed on June 30, the system became a subtropical depression near Bermuda at 12:00 UTC. Six hours later, the cyclone intensified into a subtropical storm. Based on satellite imagery, the system transitioned into a tropical storm around 12:00 UTC on July 1. Becky continued to intensify while heading northeastward under an upper-level trough. The storm reached hurricane status by midday on July 2, six hours before peaking with maximum sustained winds of 85 mph (137 km/h) and a minimum barometric pressure of 984 mbar (29.1 inHg). However, Becky soon began weakening and losing tropical characteristics, becoming an extratropical cyclone early on July 3. A cold low then caused the remnants of Becky to turn northwest toward Atlantic Canada, before being absorbed by another extratropical system to the north several hours later.

=== Hurricane Celia ===
- Category 1 hurricane (SSHWS)
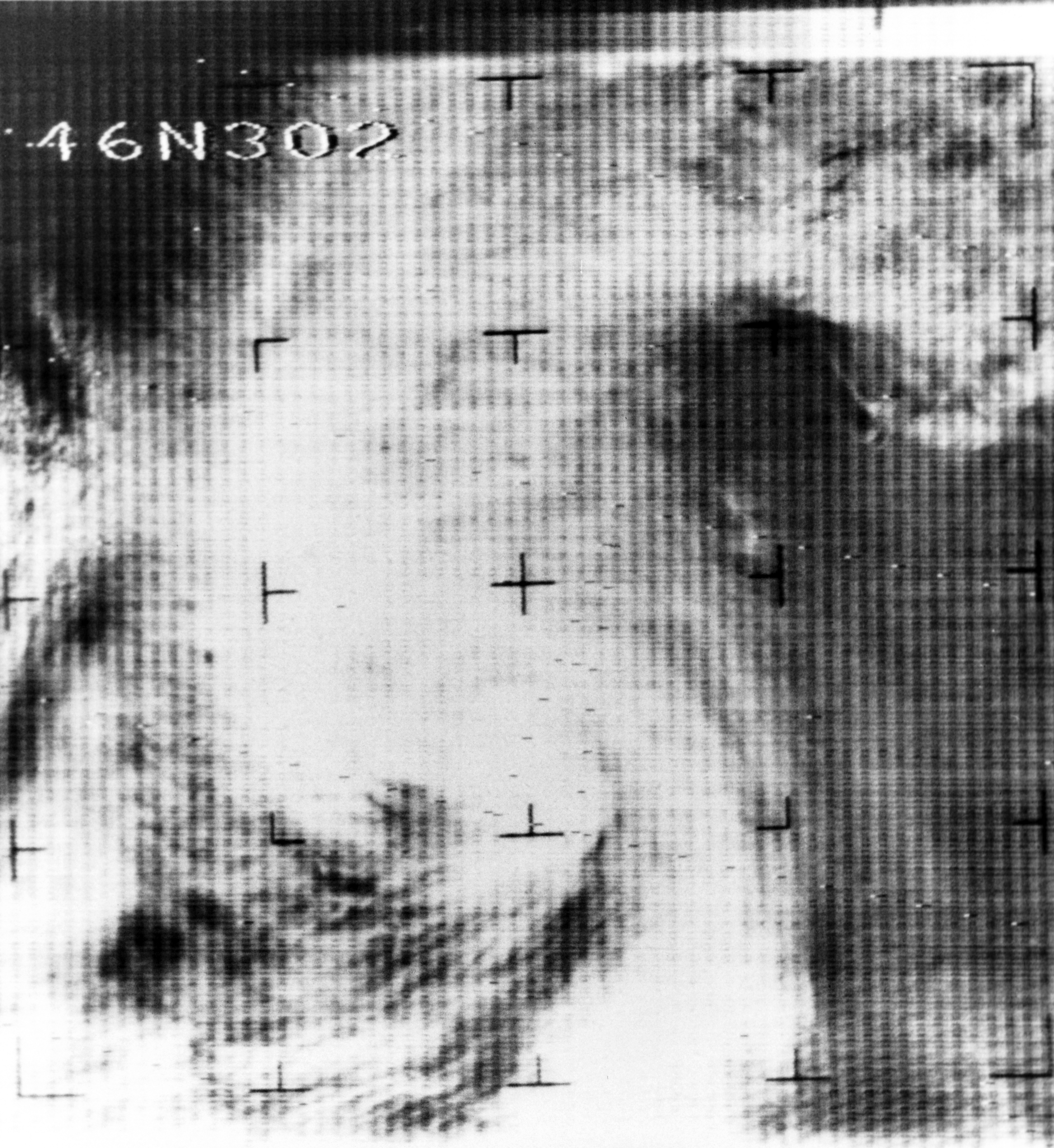
- Duration: July 13 – July 21
- Peak intensity: 75 mph (120 km/h) (1-min); 994 mbar (hPa)

A tropical wave spawned a tropical depression west of the Leeward Islands at 00:00 UTC on July 13. Six hours later, ship reports indicated that the depression strengthened into Tropical Storm Celia. However, because satellite imagery showed only a weak swirl with convection sheared well to the southeast, Celia degenerated back to a tropical wave early on July 14 north of Puerto Rico while moving westward. While nearing the central Bahamas late on July 18, the remnants of Celia regenerated into a tropical depression after regaining a low-level circulation. That day, Celia turned northward back into the open Atlantic. Observations from a ship indicate that Celia re-strengthened into a tropical storm early on July 20 as it accelerated northeastward ahead of a frontal boundary. The storm intensified significantly throughout the day, reaching hurricane status at 18:00 UTC. Celia then peaked with sustained winds of 75 mph (121 km/h) and a minimum pressure of 994 mbar (29.4 inHg). The cyclone soon began to weaken, falling to tropical storm intensity at 06:00 UTC on July 21. Six hours later, Celia transitioned into an extratropical cyclone, which struck eastern Nova Scotia late on July 21 and then dissipated over Labrador on the following day.

Only light rainfall was observed in Atlantic Canada and Quebec, with a peak total of 1.7 in (44 mm) in Nova Scotia. Portions of Newfoundland experienced wind gusts up to 45 mph (72 km/h).

=== Hurricane Dorothy ===
- Category 1 hurricane (SSHWS)
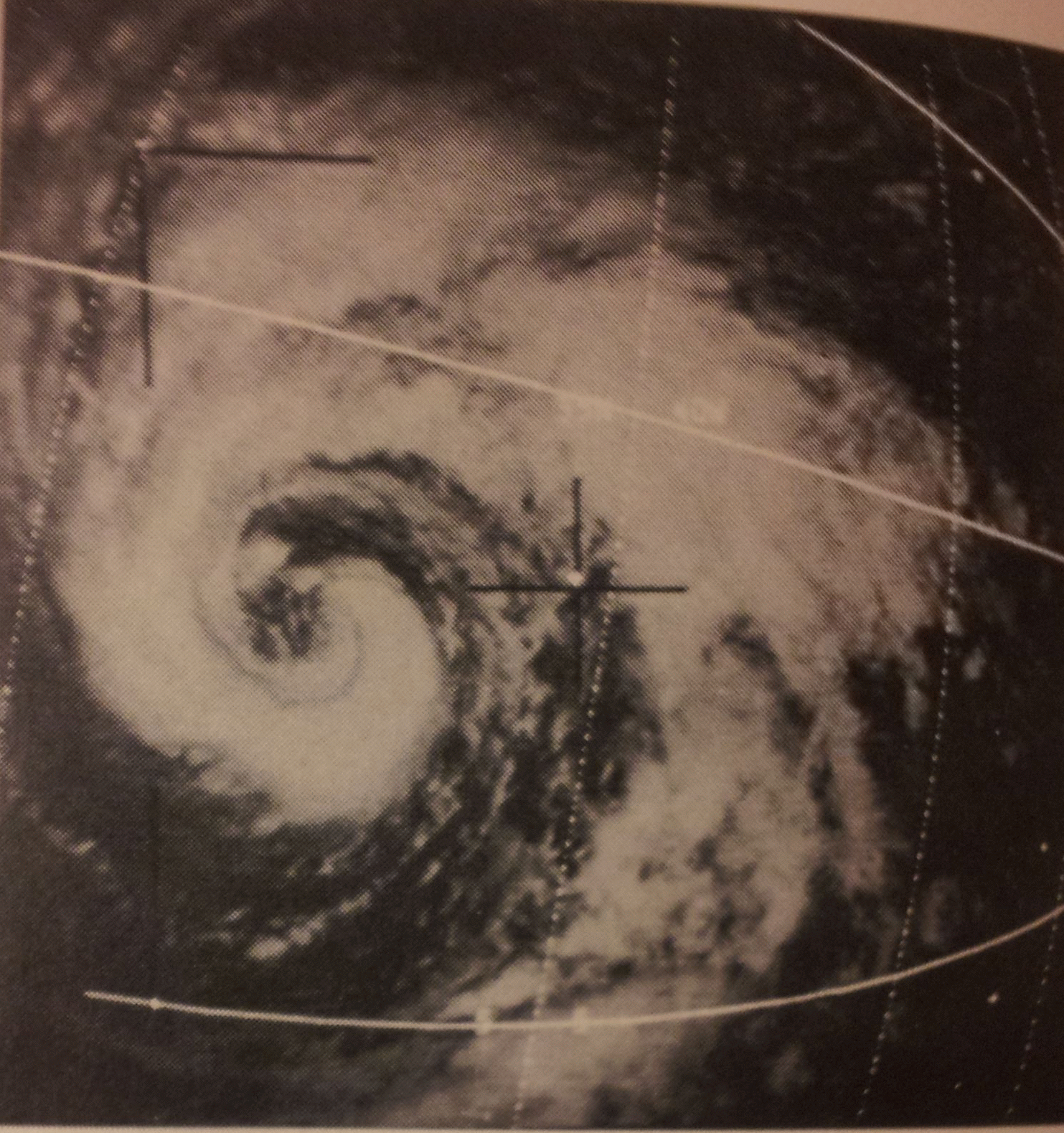
- Duration: July 21 – July 30
- Peak intensity: 85 mph (140 km/h) (1-min); 989 mbar (hPa)

In late July, a low-level disturbance situated over the central Atlantic Ocean encountered a vigorous shortwave trough and developed into a surface low-pressure area on July 21. Initially, the depression had extratropical features and lacked tropical characteristics, such as a warm core and a well-developed central dense overcast. A weather ship in the area indicated an influx of baroclinity, suggesting that Dorothy derived its energy through non-tropical processes. Around 06:00 UTC on July 23, the depression strengthened into Tropical Storm Dorothy. Thereafter, it moved in quasi-stationary motion to the northwest and continued to intensify, reaching hurricane status late on July 24.

Upon reaching hurricane intensity, Dorothy possessed tropical characteristics, with evidence of a weak warm core beginning on July 25. The hurricane moved in a semi-circular path, and at 12:00 UTC the next day, Dorothy attained its minimum barometric pressure of 989 mbar (29.2 inHg). Later on July 26, the system curved north-northeastward. Further strengthening occurred and at 00:00 UTC on July 28, Dorothy attained its maximum sustained wind speed of 85 mph (137 km/h). Moving across colder sea surface temperatures, the hurricane began weakening and fell to tropical storm status early on July 29. Dorothy continued to weaken and became extratropical around 18:00 UTC the following day, while located about 610 mi (980 km) north-northwest of Corvo Island in the Azores. The remnants continued northwestward and dissipated on July 31.

=== Tropical Storm Ella ===
- Tropical storm (SSHWS)
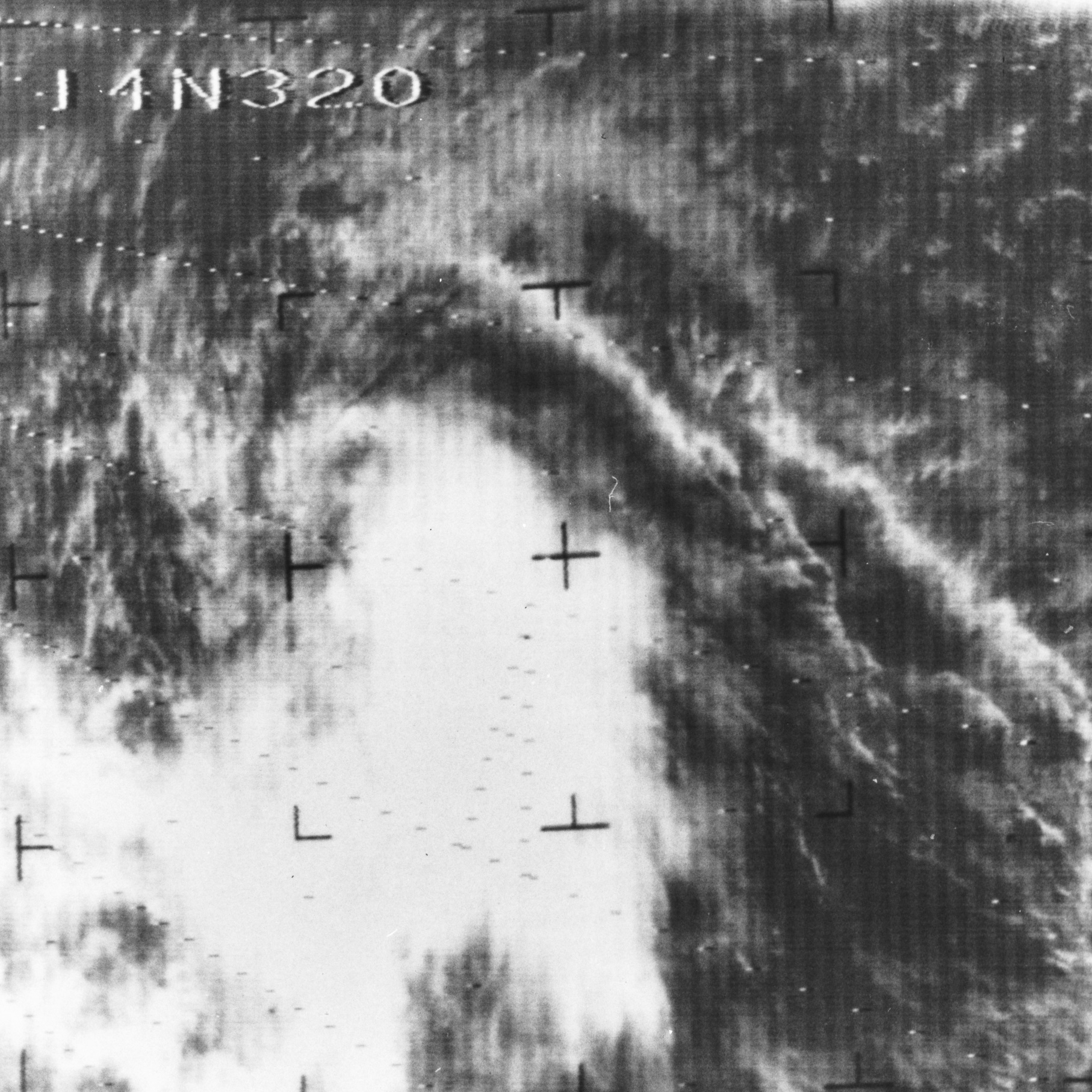
- Duration: July 22 – July 28
- Peak intensity: 40 mph (65 km/h) (1-min); 1008 mbar (hPa)

On July 20, a tropical wave emerged into the Atlantic from the west coast of Africa. The wave organized while moving westward and developed into a tropical depression at 12:00 UTC on July 22. The depression initially moved west-northwestward at approximately 23 mph (37 km/h) and slowly intensified. Early on July 24, the cyclone strengthened into Tropical Storm Ella and peaked with maximum sustained winds of 40 mph (64 km/h) and a minimum barometric pressure of 1,008 mbar (29.8 inHg). Ella remained poorly organized throughout its duration and weakened back to a tropical depression at 06:00 UTC on July 28, due to outflow from Hurricane Dorothy. Although Ella soon dissipated, its remnants turned northward and persisted until being absorbed by a frontal boundary two days later.

=== Hurricane Faith ===
- Category 3 hurricane (SSHWS)
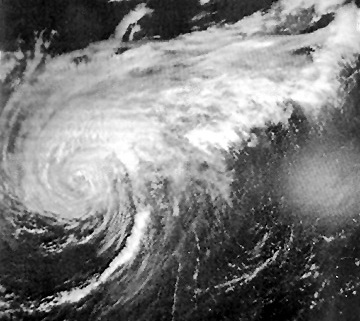
- Duration: August 21 – September 4
- Peak intensity: 120 mph (195 km/h) (1-min); 950 mbar (hPa)

An area of disturbed weather emerged into the Atlantic Ocean from the west coast of Africa in mid-August. It developed into a tropical depression while located between Cape Verde and the west coast of Africa on August 21. Tracking westward, the depression intensified and became Tropical Storm Faith on the following day. Moving westward across the Atlantic Ocean, it continued to slowly strengthen, reaching hurricane status early on August 23. However, Faith weakened back to a tropical storm early on August 26 while approaching the Lesser Antilles, before re-gaining hurricane status about 24 hours later. The outer bands of Faith produced gale-force winds in the region, especially Puerto Rico, the Virgin Islands, and Antigua. Minor damage to boats and jetties occurred as far south as Trinidad and Tobago. After curving north-northwestward near the Bahamas, Faith briefly intensified into a Category 3 hurricane on August 28, reaching an initial peak intensity with winds of 115 mph (185 km/h). The storm then weakened and fluctuated in intensity between Category 2 and Category 1 over the next few days. Faith remained well offshore the East Coast of the United States, turning northeastward on August 31 and then eastward on September 2.

Re-intensifying into a Category 3 hurricane early on September 3, Faith then attained its peak intensity with maximum sustained winds of 120 mph (195 km/h) and a minimum barometric pressure of 950 mbar (28 inHg). One person drowned in the western Atlantic after his ship sank. Heavy rainfall and strong winds pelted Bermuda, though no damage occurred. The storm resumed a northeastward motion and weakened to a Category 2 hurricane early on September 4, before becoming extratropical about 480 mi (770 km) east-southeast of Cape Race, Newfoundland. The extratropical remnants continued northeastward and later east-northeastward across the far north Atlantic. On September 6, the remnants of Faith passed near the Faroe Islands, several hours before striking Norway and crossing Scandinavia. Thereafter, the system meandered over the Soviet Union and the Arctic Ocean for the next several days, until finally becoming unidentifiable near Franz Josef Land on September 15. Three other drowning deaths occurred in the North Sea near Denmark. A fifth death occurred after a man succumbed to injuries sustained during a boating incident related to the storm. In Norway, heavy rainfall from the storm caused record high glacier melting, flooding some areas.

=== Tropical Storm Greta ===
- Tropical storm (SSHWS)
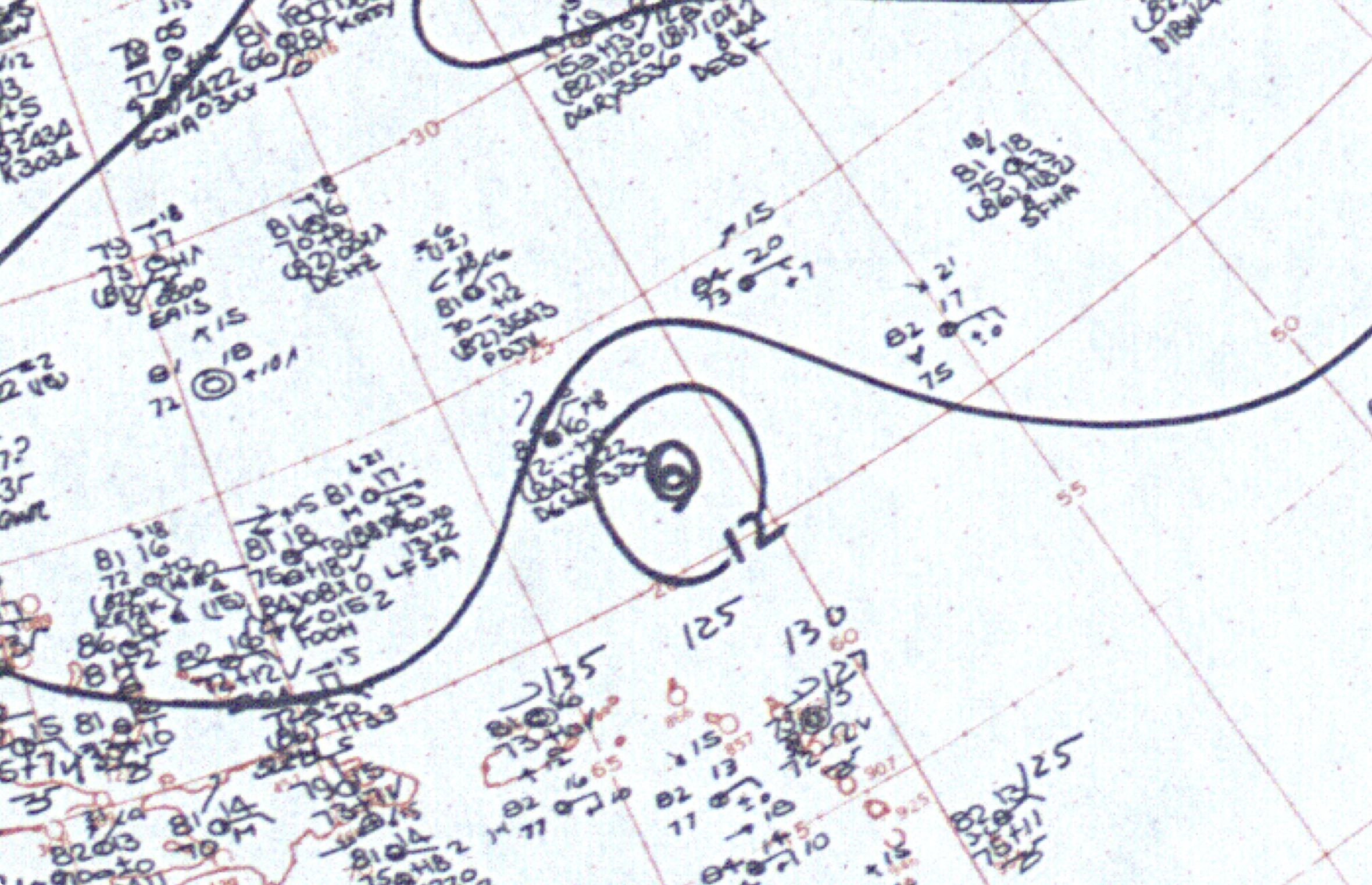
- Duration: September 1 – September 6
- Peak intensity: 50 mph (85 km/h) (1-min); 1004 mbar (hPa)

A tropical wave traversed the Atlantic well east of the Windward Islands in late August. The wave developed into a tropical depression about 745 mi (1,199 km) east of Barbados at 12:00 UTC on September 1, based on Nimbus 2 satellite imagery showing that a circulation formed within the cloud mass. The depression moved west-northwestward and remained weak and disorganized, with convection highly sheared on its east side. Based on reconnaissance flight data, the depression intensified into Tropical Storm Greta early on September 4. Based on reconnaissance data, ship reports, and the pressure-wind relationship, Greta is estimated to have peaked with maximum sustained winds of 50 mph (80 km/h) and a minimum barometric pressure of 1,004 mbar (29.6 inHg) several hours later. The cyclone slowly weakened thereafter, falling to tropical depression intensity early on September 6. Around 18:00 UTC that day, Greta degenerated into an open trough, which turned northward over the western Atlantic before being absorbed by a frontal system on September 8.

=== Tropical Storm Hallie ===
- Tropical storm (SSHWS)
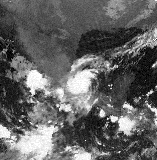
- Duration: September 20 – September 21
- Peak intensity: 60 mph (95 km/h) (1-min); 997 mbar (hPa)

Satellite imagery from ESSA 2 indicated that a large area of disturbed weather began merging with a frontal band in the southwestern Gulf of Mexico. After an increase in convective activity and satellite imagery revealing a closed circulation on September 20, the system was classified as a tropical depression at 12:00 UTC. Six hours later, the depression intensified into Tropical Storm Hallie. After initially remaining stationary, Hallie eventually began a southwestward drift toward Mexico. Early on September 21, Hallie peaked with maximum sustained winds of 60 mph (97 km/h) and a minimum barometric pressure of 997 mbar (29.4 inHg). However, the storm abruptly weakened to a tropical depression at 18:00 UTC due to cool, dry air and land interaction. Although post-season analysis indicated that Hallie soon made landfall near Nautla, Veracruz, the Atlantic hurricane reanalysis project concluded that the cyclone remained offshore and dissipated just after 18:00 UTC. The remnants of Hallie produced heavy rainfall and wind gusts up to 40 mph (64 km/h) at Nautla.

=== Hurricane Inez ===
- Category 5 hurricane (SSHWS)
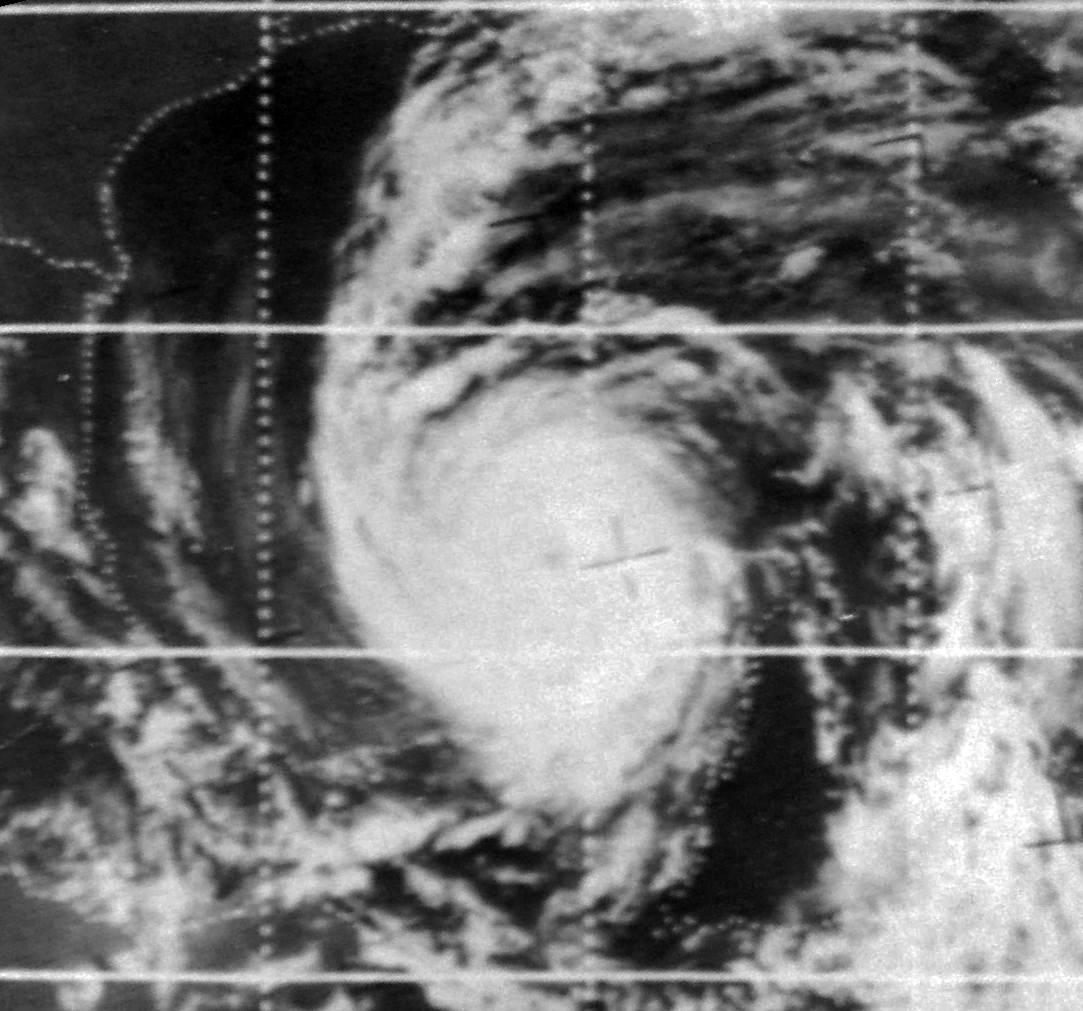
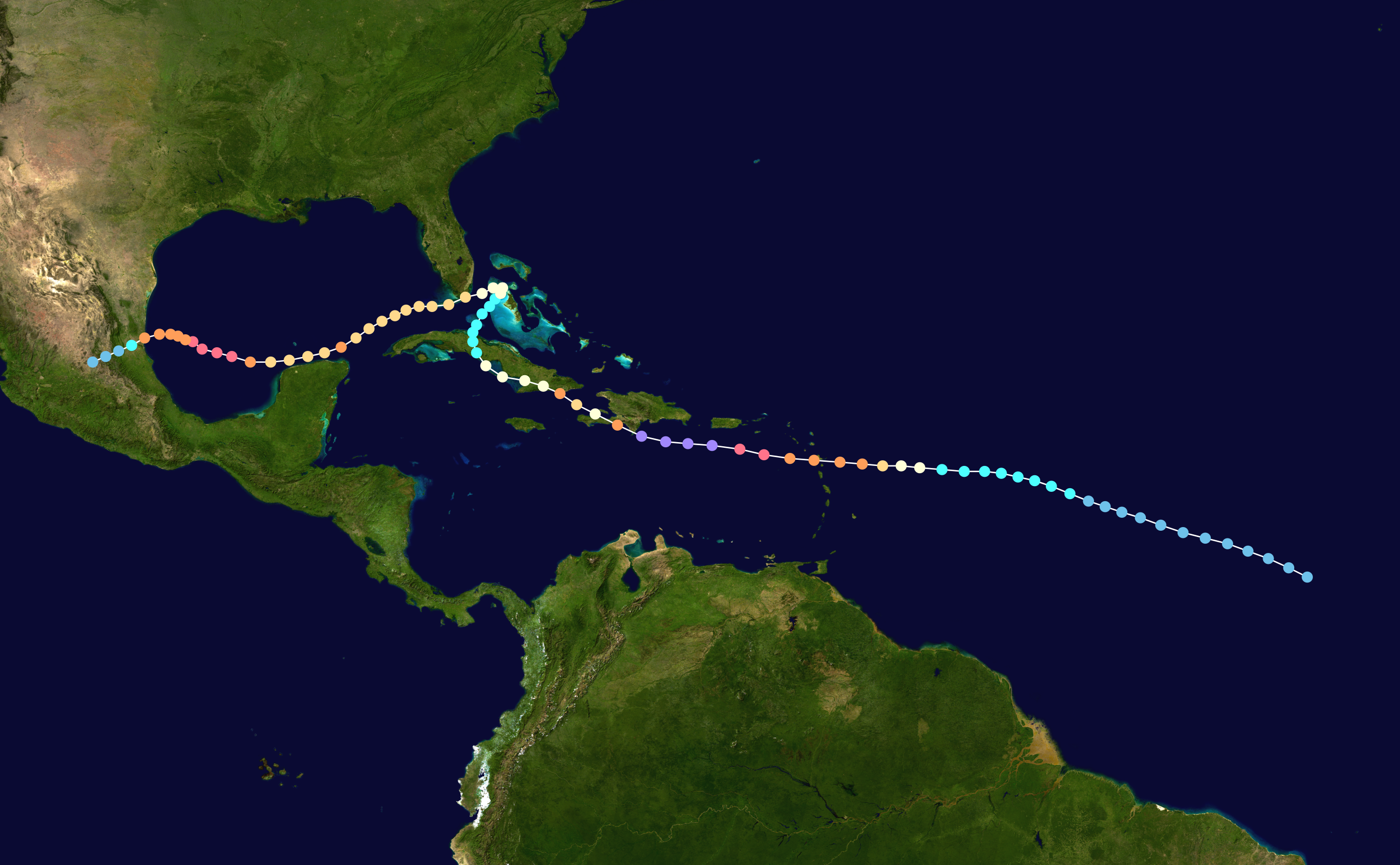
- Duration: September 21 – October 11
- Peak intensity: 165 mph (270 km/h) (1-min); 927 mbar (hPa)

A tropical wave developed into a tropical depression well east of the Lesser Antilles on September 21. It moved slowly westward and strengthened into Tropical Storm Inez on September 24. The storm strengthened into a hurricane and was quickly intensifying when it struck the French overseas region of Guadeloupe on September 27. After entering the Caribbean, Inez briefly weakened before a rapid intensification trend ensued, attaining peak sustained winds of 165 mph (270 km/h) on September 28. Continuing westward, Inez made landfall on the Barahona Peninsula of the Dominican Republic. Inez then struck southwestern Haiti, where it was considered the worst hurricane since the 1920s. Inez weakened quickly over Hispaniola, although it reintensified into a major hurricane before striking southeastern Cuba on September 30. The hurricane moved slowly over Cuba for two days before emerging into the Atlantic Ocean near the Bahamas. Inez stalled and later resumed its previous westward path. Between October 4 and October 5, the storm moved west-southwestward across the Florida Keys. Entering the Gulf of Mexico, Inez began to slowly re-strengthen. On October 10, Inez made landfall near Tampico as a Category 3 hurricane. The storm weakened rapidly and dissipated over Guanajuato on October 11.

In Guadeloupe, Inez severely damaged the island's banana and sugar crops, and thousands of homes were damaged, leaving 10,000 people homeless. There were 40 deaths and damage totaled approximately $50 million. The storm flooded many rivers and destroyed over 800 houses in Dominican Republic. There were about 100 deaths and $12 million in damage. In Haiti, as many as 1,000 people were killed, and 60,000 people were left homeless. Damage totaled $20.35 million. About 125,000 people were forced to evacuate in Cuba, and there were three deaths and $20 million in damage. In the Bahamas, heavy rainfall and high tides caused flooding, which killed five people and left $15.5 million in damage. Hurricane-force winds were observed in the Florida Keys, where 160 homes and 190 trailers were damaged. Salt spray damaged crops in the region, and there was $5 million in damage and four deaths. In the Straits of Florida, Inez capsized a boat of Cuban refugees, killing 45 people. In the northern Gulf of Mexico, a helicopter crashed after carrying evacuees from an oil rig, killing 11 people. Inez produced flooding and caused some power outages in the Yucatán Peninsula. At its final landfall, Inez flooded portions of Tamaulipas and cut off roads to Tampico. About 84,000 people were left homeless, and the hurricane destroyed at least 2,500 houses. Damage was estimated at $104 million, and there were 74 deaths in Mexico.

=== Tropical Storm Judith ===
- Tropical storm (SSHWS)
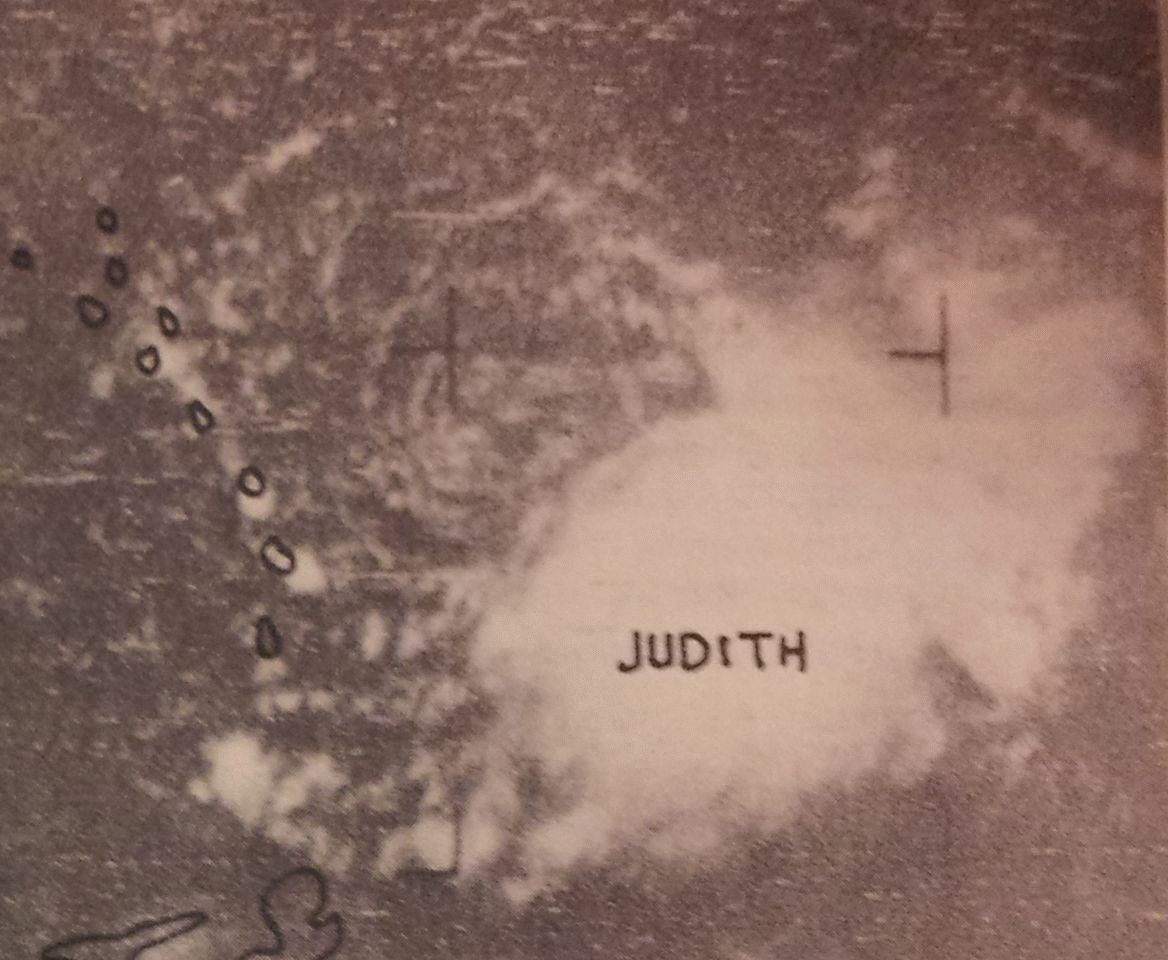
- Duration: September 27 – September 30
- Peak intensity: 50 mph (85 km/h) (1-min); 1007 mbar (hPa)

On September 26 and September 27, satellite imagery and ships monitored an area of disturbed weather located to the east of the Lesser Antilles and following Hurricane Inez. Based on reports of a circulation, the system developed into a tropical depression at 00:00 UTC on September 27. The depression intensified slowly and became Tropical Storm Judith around midday on September 28. While centered north of Barbados the next day, Judith attained its peak intensity with maximum sustained winds of 50 mph (80 km/h) and a minimum barometric pressure of 1,007 mbar (29.7 inHg), both of which were observed by a reconnaissance aircraft flight. Shortly thereafter, the storm crossed through the Windward Islands and weakened to a tropical depression, possibly due to entering the outflow of Inez. At 12:00 UTC on September 30, Judith dissipated over the eastern Caribbean Sea. Winds up to 37 mph (60 km/h) were observed on Martinique.

=== Tropical Storm Kendra ===
- Tropical storm (SSHWS)
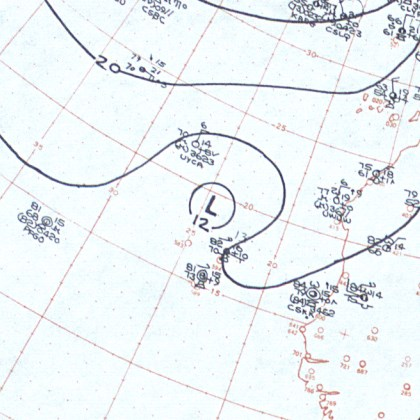
- Duration: October 3 – October 9
- Peak intensity: 40 mph (65 km/h) (1-min); 1003 mbar (hPa)

A tropical wave moved off the western coast of Africa on October 2 and spawned an area of disturbed weather that steadily organized as it moved northward between Africa and Cabo Verde. It became a tropical depression at 12:00 UTC on October 3 and maintained that strength for a few days. On October 7, a ship measured 40 mph (64 km/h) winds, the impetus for upgrading the depression to Tropical Storm Kendra. The organized nature of the system on satellite imagery suggested it may have become a tropical storm as early as October 4, but the sparsity of observations precluded an upgrade. The cyclone curved toward the southwest and began to weaken as its convection dissipated. At 00:00 UTC on October 10, it degenerated to a remnant low which dissipated into an open trough over the central Atlantic the next day. Kendra has been the focus of multiple analyses, as it was originally classified as a tropical storm, revoked as a tropical cyclone in post-season review, and finally re-designated as a tropical storm during reanalysis.

=== Hurricane Lois ===
- Category 1 hurricane (SSHWS)
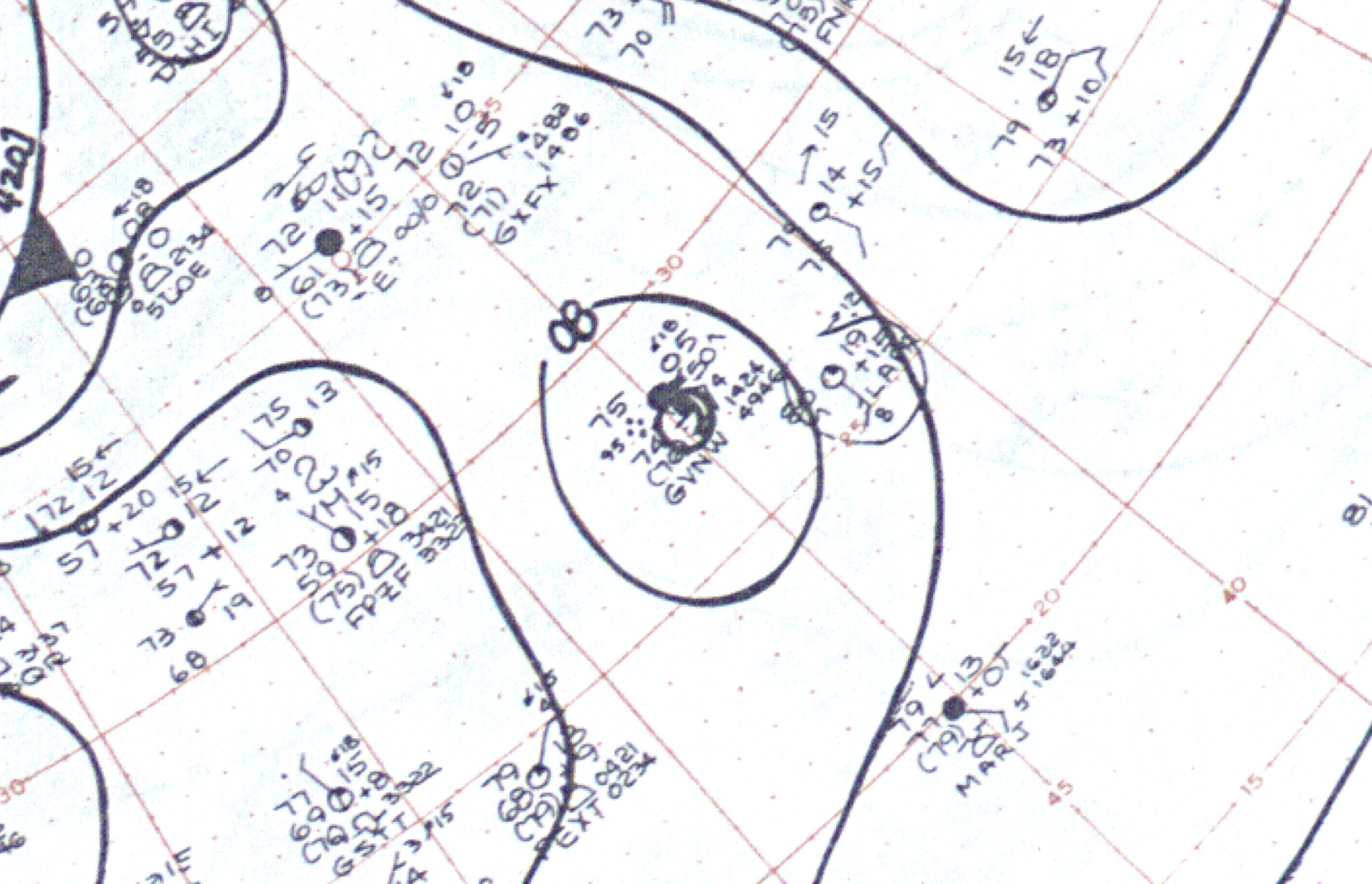
- Duration: November 4 – November 10
- Peak intensity: 80 mph (130 km/h) (1-min); 983 mbar (hPa)

A vortex within an area of low pressure developed into a tropical depression at 12:00 UTC on November 4, while located about 965 mi (1,553 km) east-southeast of Bermuda. Initially, the depression featured cold temperatures near the center and did not completely possess tropical characteristics. During the next few days, the depression organized further and acquired a warmer center of circulation while heading west-southwestward and then to the east-southeast. Late on November 6, the depression was upgraded to Tropical Storm Lois, based on reconnaissance aircraft flight observations. Passing west of the Azores on November 10, a sustained wind speed of 50 mph (80 km/h) was observed on Corvo Island. Moving over colder ocean waters, at 18:00 UTC on November 10 Lois transitioned from a hurricane into an extratropical storm while located about 640 mi (1,030 km) north of São Miguel Island. Transitioning at 42.7N, this made Lois the farthest north an Atlantic hurricane has traveled in the month of November on record, until surpassed by Hurricane Martin in 2022. The remnants curved southeastward while weakening until dissipating a few hundred miles offshore Portugal at 06:00 UTC on November 14.

=== Mid November tropical storm ===
- Tropical storm (SSHWS)
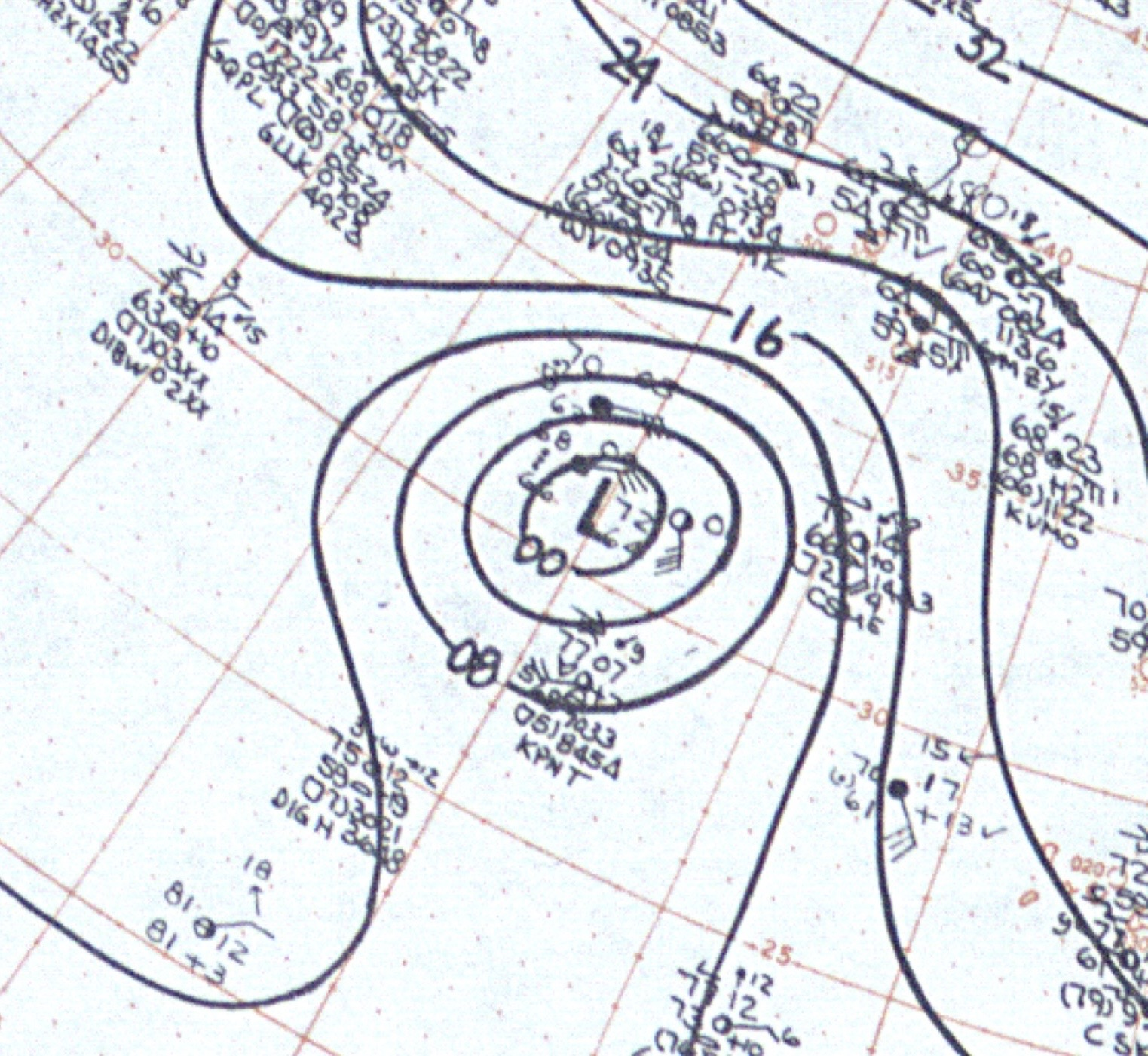
- Duration: November 13 – November 17
- Peak intensity: 65 mph (100 km/h) (1-min); 994 mbar (hPa)

On November 13, an area of low pressure developed in the eastern Atlantic at the tail-end of a cold front connected to the extratropical remnants of Lois. Surface observations and satellite imagery suggest a subtropical storm formed at 18:00 UTC that day. The system moved west and slowly shed its frontal boundaries; it is thus analyzed to have become a tropical storm on November 14. The small system developed organized banding features, and ship observations support it reaching winds of at least 65 mph (105 km/h), although the sparsity of data suggests it could have become a hurricane. The storm began curving poleward and passed west of the Azores on November 17, where it intercepted cold, dry air and transitioned into an extratropical cyclone around 18:00 UTC that day.

=== Late November tropical storm ===
- Tropical storm (SSHWS)
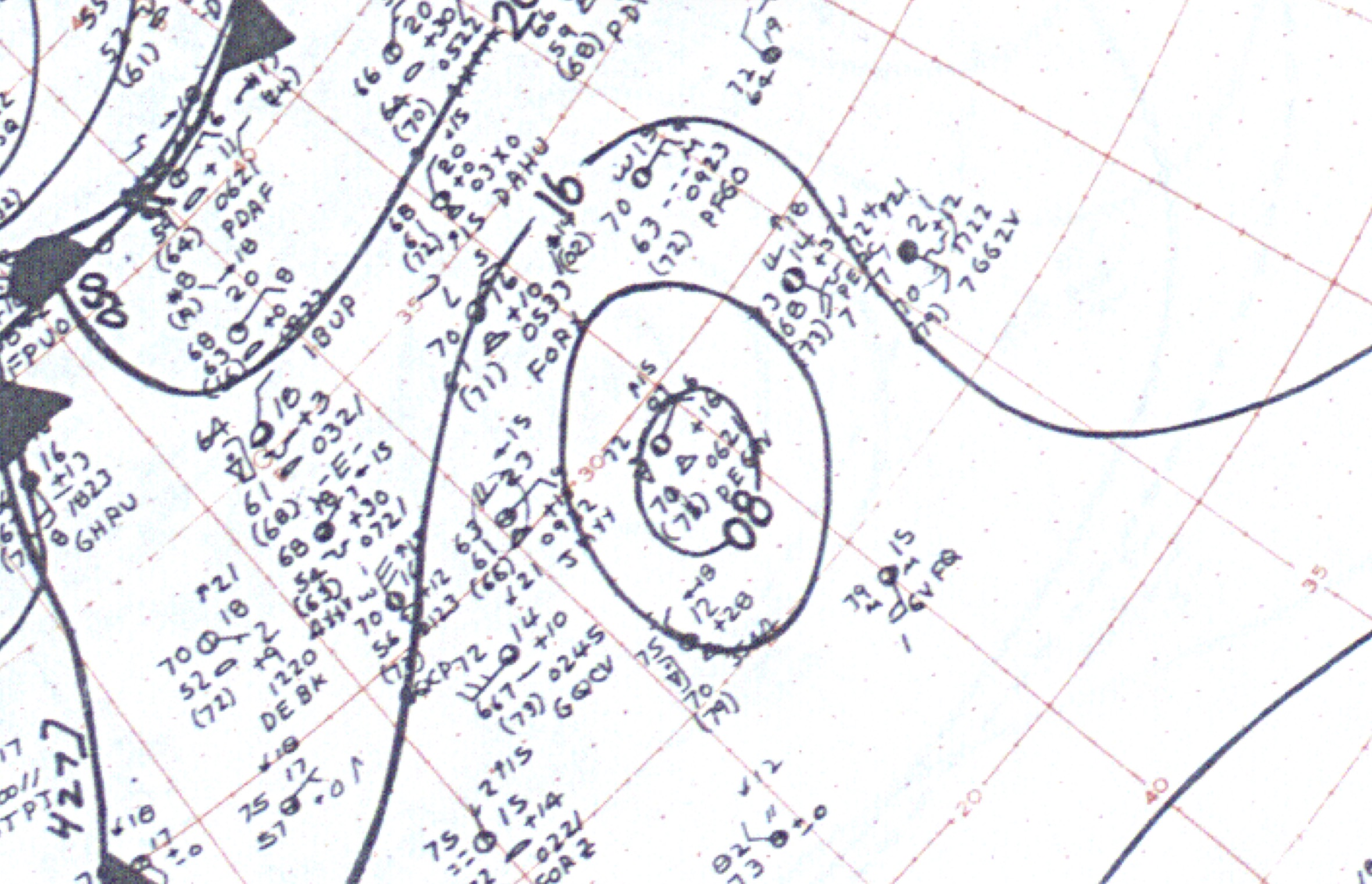
- Duration: November 19 – November 26
- Peak intensity: 65 mph (100 km/h) (1-min); 997 mbar (hPa)

Similar to the previous system, an area of low pressure developed at the tail-end of a front over the central Atlantic on November 19. After persisting as an extratropical cyclone for a few days, the northeast-moving system acquired characteristics of a tropical storm at 00:00 UTC on November 22. Two days later, it reached peak winds of 65 mph (105 km/h) as it curved toward the northwest. An intensifying non-tropical low progressing across the western Atlantic increased shear over the system, causing it to open up into a trough around 00:00 UTC on November 26.

=== Other systems ===
There were also two weaker tropical cyclones during the season.

A tropical depression was reported to have existed in late July. A tropical low-pressure area moved across Florida and entered the northeastern Gulf of Mexico on July 24. By the following day, coastal radars indicated a relatively well-defined circulation. As a result, it is estimated that the system became a tropical depression later on July 25. After minimal intensification, the depression made landfall near Boothville, Louisiana early on July 26. The depression then curved westward and dissipated on the next day. Other than heavy thunderstorms and a brief suspension of fishing activities, no other effects were reported.

There was a report of a tropical depression that lasted from September 27 to 30.

== Storm names ==
The following list of names was used for named storms (tropical storms and hurricanes) that formed in the North Atlantic in 1966. Storms were named Dorothy, Faith, Hallie, Inez, Kendra and Lois for the first (and only, in the case of Inez) time in 1966.

- Alma
- Becky
- Celia
- Dorothy
- Ella
- Faith
- Greta
- Hallie
- Inez
- Judith
- Kendra
- Lois
- Marsha (unused)
- Noreen (unused)
- Orpha (unused)
- Patty (unused)
- Rena (unused)
- Sherry (unused)
- Thora (unused)
- Vicky (unused)
- Wilma (unused)

=== Retirement ===
Early in 1967, at the recommendation of the Interdepartmental Hurricane Warning Conference, the name Faith was removed from the naming list. And later, following the 1969 interdepartmental conference, Inez was retired from further use as an Atlantic tropical cyclone name. Faith and Inez were replaced with Felice and Isabel, respectively, when the 1966 list was used again for the 1970 season.

== Season effects ==
This is a table of all of the tropical cyclones that formed in the 1966 Atlantic hurricane season. It includes their name, duration, peak classification and intensities, areas affected, damage, and death totals. Deaths in parentheses are additional and indirect (an example of an indirect death would be a traffic accident), but were still related to that storm. Damage and deaths include totals while the storm was extratropical, a wave, or a low, and all of the damage figures are in 1966 USD.

Saffir–Simpson scale
TD	TS	C1	C2	C3	C4	C5

1966 North Atlantic tropical cyclone season statistics
Storm name	Dates active	Storm category at peak intensity	Max 1-min wind mph (km/h)	Min. press. (mbar)	Areas affected	Damage (US$)	Deaths	Ref(s).
Alma	June 5–14	Category 3 hurricane	115 (185)	970	Nicaragua, Honduras, Cuba, Florida, Georgia, East Coast of the United States	≥$210 million	90	
Unnumbered	June 28 – July 2	Tropical depression	30 (45)	1007	Louisiana	$100,000	None	
Unnamed	June 28 – July 2	Tropical storm	45 (75)	1004	Cuba, Florida, Georgia	None	None	
Becky	June 30 – July 3	Category 1 hurricane	85 (140)	984	None	None	None	
Celia	July 13–22	Category 1 hurricane	75 (120)	994	Bahamas, Atlantic Canada	None	None	
Dorothy	July 21–30	Category 1 hurricane	85 (140)	989	None	None	None	
Ella	July 22–28	Tropical storm	40 (65)	1008	None	None	None	
Faith	August 21 – September 13	Category 3 hurricane	120 (195)	950	Lesser Antilles, Bermuda, Faroe Islands, Scandinavia	None	4	
Greta	September 1–6	Tropical storm	50 (85)	1004	None	None	None	
Hallie	September 20–21	Tropical storm	60 (95)	997	Veracruz	None	None	
Inez	September 21 – October 11	Category 5 hurricane	165 (270)	927	Lesser Antilles, Hispaniola, Cuba, Bahamas, Florida Keys, Yucatán Peninsula, northeastern Mexico	$222.5 million	1,000	
Judith	September 27–30	Tropical storm	50 (85)	1007	Windward Islands	None	None	
Unnumbered	September 27–30	Tropical depression	35 (55)	1012	None	None	None	
Kendra	October 3–11	Tropical storm	40 (65)	1003	None	None	None	
Lois	November 4–14	Category 1 hurricane	80 (130)	983	None	None	None	
Unnamed	November 13–19	Tropical storm	65 (100)	994	None	None	None	
Unnamed	November 19–26	Tropical storm	65 (100)	997	None	None	None	
Season aggregates
17 systems	June 5 – November 26		165 (270)	927		≤$432.6 million	1,094	

== See also ==
- 1966 Pacific hurricane season
- 1966 Pacific typhoon season
- Australian cyclone seasons: 1965–66, 1966–67
- South Pacific cyclone seasons: 1965–66, 1966–67
- South-West Indian Ocean cyclone seasons: 1965–66, 1966–67
