= Hurricane Faith =

Category 3 Atlantic hurricane in 1966

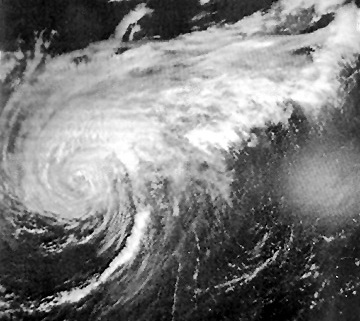
- Faith on September 1 as it moved towards Cape Hatteras

Meteorological history
- Formed: August 21, 1966
- Extratropical: September 4, 1966
- Dissipated: September 15, 1966

Category 3 major hurricane
- 1-minute sustained (SSHWS/NWS)
- Highest winds: 120 mph (195 km/h)
- Lowest pressure: 950 mbar (hPa); 28.05 inHg

Overall effects
- Fatalities: 4 direct, 1 indirect
- Areas affected: Lesser Antilles, Bermuda, Faroe Islands, Europe
- IBTrACS
- Part of the 1966 Atlantic hurricane season

Hurricane Faith was a long-lived Cape Verde hurricane and was the sixth named storm and fifth hurricane of the 1966 Atlantic hurricane season. Faith developed from an area of disturbed weather between Cape Verde and the west coast of Africa on August 21. Tracking westward, the depression gradually intensified and became Tropical Storm Faith on the following day. Moving westward across the Atlantic Ocean, it continued to slowly strengthen, reaching hurricane status early on August 23. Over the next several days, the storm trekked north of the Lesser Antilles, weakening into a tropical storm on August 26. Located near the Lesser Antilles, the outer bands of Faith produced gale-force winds in the region, especially Puerto Rico, the Virgin Islands, and Antigua. Minor coastal damage occurred as far south as Trinidad and Tobago.

On August 27, the storm reached hurricane status again, and the next day, the storm further intensified into a major hurricane after curving north-northwestward near The Bahamas. The next day, the storm weakened back to a Category 2 hurricane and began re-curving to the northeast. One person drowned in the western Atlantic after his ship sank. Heavy rainfall and strong winds pelted Bermuda, though no damage occurred. The storm maintained hurricane intensity for several days, while tracking east of the United States. On September 3, Faith reattained major hurricane status as it underwent extratropical transition, reaching peak winds of 120 mph (190 km/h). Faith then weakened as it completed extratropical transition east of Atlantic Canada. The system continued traversing the Atlantic Ocean for several days, finally dissipating on September 15, while located just north of Franz Josef Land. Three other drowning deaths occurred in the North Sea near Denmark. A fifth death occurred after a man succumbed to injuries sustained during a boating incident related to the storm.

== Meteorological history ==
Map plotting the storm's track and intensity, according to the Saffir–Simpson scale Map key Saffir–Simpson scale Tropical depression (≤38 mph, ≤62 km/h) Tropical storm (39–73 mph, 63–118 km/h) Category 1 (74–95 mph, 119–153 km/h) Category 2 (96–110 mph, 154–177 km/h) Category 3 (111–129 mph, 178–208 km/h) Category 4 (130–156 mph, 209–251 km/h) Category 5 (≥157 mph, ≥252 km/h) Unknown Storm type Tropical cyclone Subtropical cyclone Extratropical cyclone, remnant low, tropical disturbance, or monsoon depression

Television Infrared Observation Satellite XI (TIROS XI) imagery indicated the presence of an area of disturbed weather over Ivory Coast on August 18. The system moved slowly westward and eventually reached the Atlantic Ocean. It is estimated that a tropical depression developed at 0000 UTC on August 21, while located about 240 miles (390 km) southeast of Cape Verde. Continuing westward, the depression intensified, and was upgraded to Tropical Storm Faith on the following day. Gradual intensification persisted as Tropical Storm Faith headed nearly due westward at 17 to 23 mph (27 to 37 km/h). By August 23, Faith was upgraded to a Category 1 hurricane. Curving slightly west-northwestward, the storm reached Category 2 intensity and briefly peaked at sustained winds of 105 mph (169 km/h). Hurricane Faith curved to the northwest and weakened back to a Category 1 hurricane while approaching the northeastern Leeward Islands on August 25. Initially, Faith was scheduled to be seeded as part of Project Stormfury. However, the scheduled seeding was cancelled as Faith was approaching The Bahamas. Bypassing the Leeward Islands, Faith remained at nearly the same intensity, until re-strengthening into Category 2 hurricane on August 28, near Turks and Caicos Islands. The storm quickly intensified further into a Category 3 hurricane only six hours later.

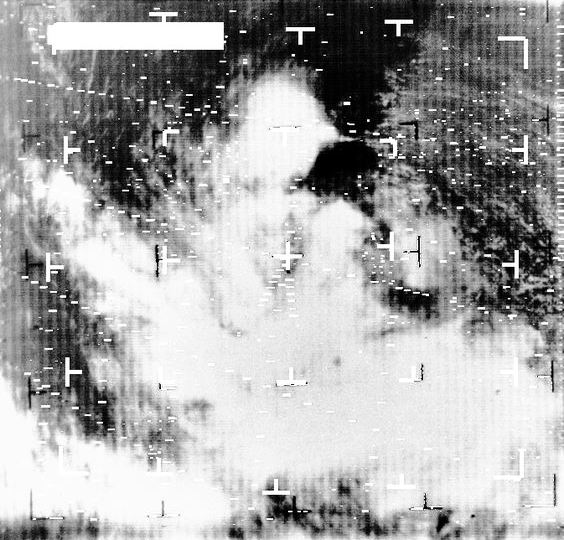
Nimbus 2 satellite image of the precursor to Faith on August 20, emerging off the west coast of Africa

At 00:00 UTC on August 29, Faith attained its maximum sustained winds of 125 mph (201 km/h). After reaching maximum sustained winds late on August 29, Faith began to gradually weaken and decreased to Category 2 hurricane intensity early on August 30. By that time, the storm turned to the northeast around the periphery of an Atlantic subtropical anticyclone while located about midway between Bermuda and Florida. Faith remained well offshore of the East Coast of the United States and Atlantic Canada, after veering eastward on September 1. Thereafter, it began to accelerate and eventually curved northeastward. While approaching Europe, Faith's forward speed increased to as much as 50 mph (80 km/h). At 0600 UTC on September 3, a minimum barometric pressure of 950 mbar (28 inHg) was recorded – the lowest in relation to the storm. On September 4, Faith transitioned into an extratropical storm retaining Category 2 equivalent winds. It continued to weaken as it neared the Faroe Islands and crossed the North Sea. The extratropical remnants of Faith headed eastward and affected Norway with winds as high as 60 mph (97 km/h). Tracking over Scandinavia, the extratropical storm weakened to the equivalent of a tropical depression before entering the Soviet Union (present day Russia). Eventually, the storm degenerated into an extratropical low pressure area, curved northward, and retained its identity until September 15, when it was over Franz Josef Land, which is roughly 600 miles (970 km) from the North Pole.

== Impact ==
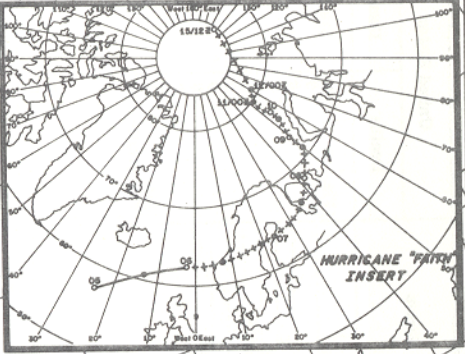
Track map of Hurricane Faith as an extratropical cyclone

In the Leeward Islands, the approach of Faith caused the tracking station on Antigua – which was monitoring an unmanned rocket launched by the National Aeronautics and Space Administration (NASA) – to shut down 45 minutes after the rocket lifted off. Faith also produced gale-force winds across Puerto Rico and the Virgin Islands, though only minor damage and no fatalities or injuries were reported. Further south, Faith brought rough seas to Trinidad and Tobago, with waves ranging from 10 to 15 feet (3.0 to 4.6 m). These conditions inflicted minor damage to small boats and jetties. In the Turks and Caicos Islands, sea defenses suffered some damage as Faith passed about 65 miles (105 km) to the east-northeast. Along the East Coast of the United States, the storm produced rough seas and high tides from Cape Canaveral (then Cape Kennedy), Florida, to the Virginia Capes. Additionally, the Weather Bureau warned of possible gale-force winds in The Carolinas and Virginia, but also noted that the area would only experience fringe effects from the storm. In Bermuda, the outer rainbands of Hurricane Faith produced heavy rainfall and wind gusts up to 62 mph (100 km/h).

Five people died as a result of the storm, though only one of them on land. Rough seas in the western Atlantic battered the Alberto Benati, pitching one man overboard. Two others drowned near Denmark while attempting to cross the Atlantic Ocean in a rowboat. Another man was missing and presumed dead after heavy seas forced him and his shipmates to abandon their boat off the northern coast of Denmark. Property damage was minimal, mainly because the areas impacted by Faith were sparsely populated. A 2,726 ton Norwegian car ferry known as Skagerak began to sink as it headed for Hirtshals in Region Nordjylland of Denmark. Waves pounded the side hatches, which flooded in the engine room, causing the ship to become disabled. A large-scale search operation was conducted to rescue the 144 passengers aboard. All passengers were rescued and treated for their injuries in Hjørring, Denmark, however one person later died in the hospital. In Norway, the remnants of Faith impacted areas between Ryfylke and Sunnfjord. The storm brought heavy rainfall and resulted in glacier melting, which in turn caused rampant flooding in some locations. Discharge from the Folgefonna, Fjærland, and Sunnfjord glaciers reached a record high melt due to the remnants of Faith.

== See also ==
- Tropical cyclone effects in Europe
- List of Bermuda hurricanes
- Atlantic hurricane records
