= Hurricane Alma (1966) =

Category 3 Atlantic hurricane

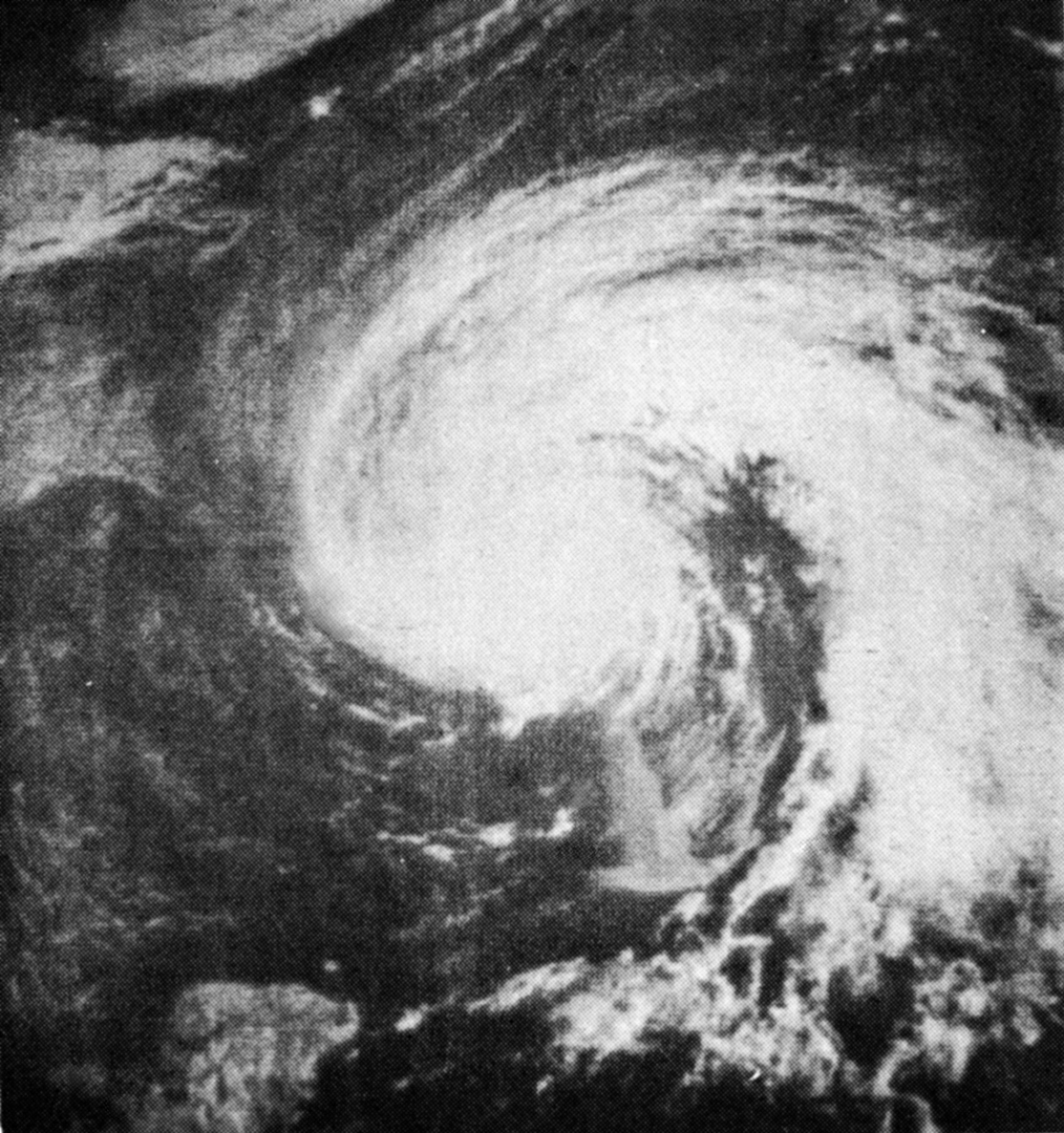
- Satellite image of Hurricane Alma approaching landfall in the Big Bend region of Florida on June 9

Meteorological history
- Formed: June 4, 1966
- Dissipated: June 14, 1966

Category 3 major hurricane
- 1-minute sustained (SSHWS/NWS)
- Highest winds: 115 mph (185 km/h)
- Lowest pressure: 970 mbar (hPa); 28.64 inHg

Overall effects
- Fatalities: 90 total
- Damage: $210 million (1966 USD)
- Areas affected: Nicaragua, Honduras, Cuba, East Coast of the United States
- IBTrACS
- Part of the 1966 Atlantic hurricane season

Hurricane Alma was a rare June major hurricane in the 1966 Atlantic hurricane season. It was the earliest Atlantic hurricane in the calendar year in fifteen years, as well as the earliest continental U.S. hurricane strike since 1825. Alma developed on June 4 over Central America, and while moving through Honduras, it dropped heavy rainfall that killed at least 73 people in the city of San Rafael. Offshore northern Honduras, the system produced heavy rainfall in Swan Island. Alma moved northeastward and intensified into a hurricane on June 6. It crossed western Cuba, causing heavy crop damage and water shortages. Alma destroyed over 1,000 houses, and damage was estimated around $200 million (1966 USD). The storm killed 11 people in the country.

After crossing Cuba, Alma intensified further to reach winds of 115 mph (185 km/h) in the Gulf of Mexico. The hurricane passed west of Key West, Florida, causing a power outage and flooding. Alma dropped heavy rainfall and produced winds across most of Florida, which damaged crops and caused scattered power outages. The hurricane weakened before moving ashore near Apalachee Bay. Damage in Florida was estimated at $10 million, and there were six deaths in the state.

Alma crossed southeastern Georgia as a tropical storm, damaging a few houses and causing light damage. The storm re-intensified into a hurricane over the western Atlantic Ocean, and its outer rainbands dropped heavy rainfall in Wilmington, North Carolina. Alma encountered colder water temperatures and its intensity decreased to being an extratropical cyclone on June 13. Its remnants dissipated a day later over Massachusetts.

== Meteorological history ==
Map plotting the storm's track and intensity, according to the Saffir–Simpson scale Map key Saffir–Simpson scale Tropical depression (≤38 mph, ≤62 km/h) Tropical storm (39–73 mph, 63–118 km/h) Category 1 (74–95 mph, 119–153 km/h) Category 2 (96–110 mph, 154–177 km/h) Category 3 (111–129 mph, 178–208 km/h) Category 4 (130–156 mph, 209–251 km/h) Category 5 (≥157 mph, ≥252 km/h) Unknown Storm type Tropical cyclone Subtropical cyclone Extratropical cyclone, remnant low, tropical disturbance, or monsoon depression

During June 1966, low atmospheric pressure stretched across the western Caribbean and Gulf of Mexico—a pattern that is conducive for tropical cyclogenesis. During the first few days of the month, a dissipating trough extended from the southeastern United States into the western Caribbean. A mid-level circulation developed along the trough near Cabo Gracias a Dios on June 3. By the next day, the circulation had reached the surface, which marked the development of a tropical depression over eastern Nicaragua. On June 5, the depression crossed Honduras and emerged into the western Caribbean, moving north-northeastward through an area of warm sea surface temperatures. It had a good cyclonic circulation, convection, and moisture content, but most significantly, a passing trough to the north provided the depression with favorable outflow. On June 6, the depression rapidly intensified into Tropical Storm and later Hurricane Alma. This made it the earliest hurricane in the basin since Hurricane Able in 1951.

After attaining hurricane status, Alma continued moving slowly to the north-northeast, although its intensification rate slowed. While over the western Caribbean, Alma was a large hurricane with gale-force winds covering about 200,000 sq mi (520,000 km^{2}). The hurricane accelerated on June 8, quickly moving across Isla de la Juventud and later mainland Cuba with winds of around 100 mph (160 km/h). Alma did not weaken over land and entered the Gulf of Mexico, where it turned northwestward and passed between Key West and the Dry Tortugas. Late on June 8, a station in the Dry Tortugas reported winds of 125 mph (201 km/h) and a minimum barometric pressure of 970 mbar (29 inHg). These figures were originally considered the storm's peak intensity. However, a conflict in observations from Dry Tortugas and a reconnaissance aircraft flight, as well as the possibility that the former experienced a mesocyclone that did not represent the intensity of the storm, led to the maximum sustained winds being adjusted to 115 mph (185 km/h) in a 2022 renalysis. The hurricane began weakening as it paralleled the west coast of Florida, at which point a developing upper-level low over the northern Gulf of Mexico began to influence its motion. While the hurricane moved northward through the Gulf of Mexico, it had a large, ragged eye that reached 75 mi (121 km) in diameter. Initially, forecasters anticipated Alma would cross central Florida, although the hurricane turned to the north-northwest. Cool water temperatures contributed to weakening, and Alma made landfall near Apalachee Bay with winds of 85 mph (140 km/h) on June 9. This marked the earliest United States hurricane landfall since a hurricane in May and June of 1825.

While turning northeastward over northern Florida, Alma quickly weakened to a tropical storm. It moved across Georgia and emerged into the Atlantic near Savannah late on June 10. Its circulation remained near the coast, although by late on June 11, Alma had moved far enough offshore that it was able to re-intensify into a hurricane. It developed a large eye and maintained hurricane intensity for about 30 hours. Afterward, Alma turned to the north into an area of drier air and colder waters, and again weakened to a tropical storm on June 12. The next day, Alma transitioned into an extratropical cyclone to the east of Virginia. The remnants continued to the northeast and dissipated on June 14 over Massachusetts.

== Preparations ==
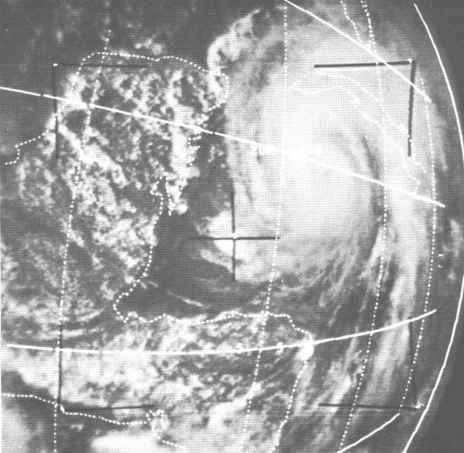
Satellite image of Hurricane Alma approaching western Cuba

In Cuba, evacuations were ordered for Nueva Gerona on Isla de la Juventud, and for 113,754 people on the mainland. Cattle were moved to a safe location for the storm's passage. President Fidel Castro declared a state of emergency in four western provinces due to the threat to the local sugar industry.

Before Alma struck Florida, officials issued hurricane warnings from the Florida Keys through Apalachicola. A hurricane watch and gale warning were issued for the state's eastern coastline, extending to Savannah, Georgia. In Key West, residents boarded up houses, and about 1,000 people fled to the region's 11 shelters. The MIM-23 Hawk antiaircraft missiles in the city were moved to higher ground, having been in place since the 1962 Cuban Missile Crisis. Further north, officials ordered the evacuation of Captiva Island and Sanibel Island. The causeways to Sanibel Island were closed, isolating residents who had not evacuated. Ten emergency shelters were opened in Fort Myers and two in Naples. Overall, about 100,000 people were advised to seek shelter, though many of them chose to stay in their homes. All Phantom jet fighters at MacDill Air Force Base in Tampa were transported to Columbus Air Force Base in Mississippi, while aircraft were also evacuated from Homestead Air Reserve Base. Because Alma was initially forecast to cross the central portion of the state, residents along the Florida panhandle were not adequately prepared for the hurricane. Just hours before the storm moved ashore, officials ordered evacuations for residents in low-lying areas around Apalachicola.

One week before a scheduled hurricane preparedness drill at Kennedy Space Center, Alma presented the facility with an actual storm threat. A full-scale version of a Saturn V rocket was rolled back to the Vehicle Assembly Building on June 8 in less than 11 hours, which was within the anticipated time for such a move and before the expected arrival of 60 mph (97 km/h) wind gusts. Two other rockets were also removed from their pads.

== Impact ==
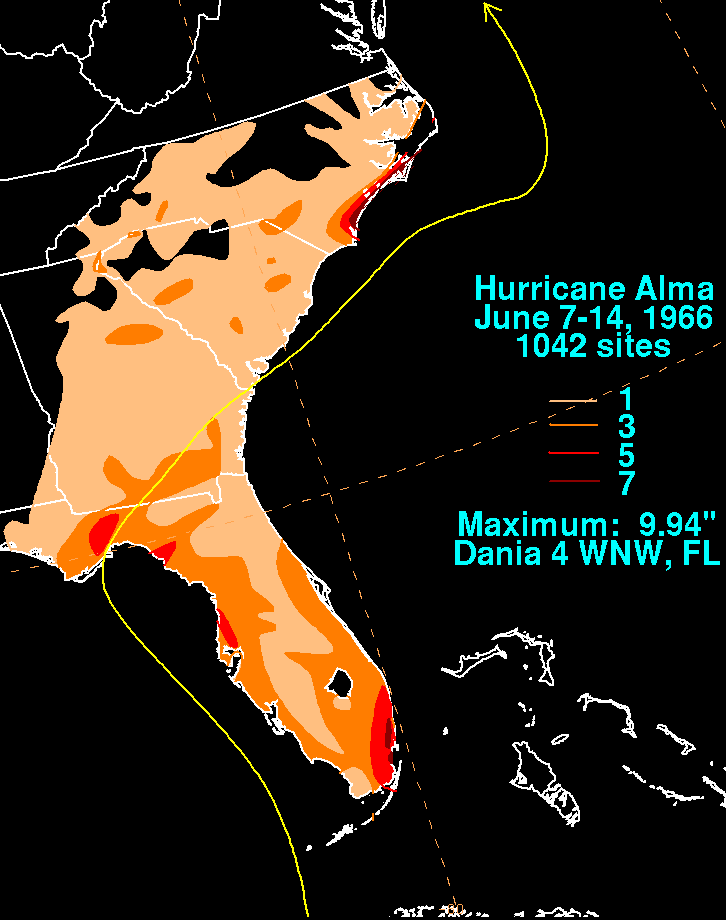
Alma's rainfall in the United States

=== Central America ===
During its formative stages, Alma produced heavy rainfall for several days across Central America, primarily in Nicaragua and Honduras. Overnight on June 5, the city of San Rafael, Honduras recorded about 30 in (760 mm) of precipitation, possibly in relation to a localized cloudburst. The extreme rainfall flooded the entire city and left most of it covered with about 3 ft (1 m) of mud. Most of San Rafael was destroyed, and there were at 73 deaths in the city; one news report indicated that 75 people died in the city. Many rivers in Honduras became swollen at the height of the storm. On Swan Island, offshore northern Honduras, the storm dropped 14.28 in (363 mm) of rain. There was little damage on the island.

=== Cuba ===
Before affecting Cuba, Alma spawned a tornado in Cayman Brac that destroyed a few houses and power lines. On Isla de la Juventud, the combination of high winds and rains destroyed dairy facilities, chicken farms, and large areas of fruit crops. The storm also destroyed a large radio tower on the island. When Alma struck Cuba, it produced high tides in southern La Habana Province that destroyed many fishing boats and wharves. Several towns along the coastline were flooded during the storm. The hurricane crossed western Cuba while strengthening. The Havana Institute of Meteorology recorded winds of 110 mph (180 km/h) and a barometric pressure of 980 mbar (29 inHg). The strong winds knocked down trees and power lines, including in the capital city of Havana where hundreds of trees fell. The city had power outages and damage to its water systems. More than 1,000 houses were damaged in Havana. Many of them were poorly constructed due to lack of government funding to repair the gradually deteriorating structures in the tropical climate. High winds sank a boat in Pinar del Río Province; one of the occupants drowned, and the other two swam to shore.

Alma caused significant crop damage in western Cuba; it destroyed 13,400 acres (5,400 hectares) of bananas and 18,090 acres (7,320 hectares) of corn fields. There were also heavy losses to fruit trees and to the sugar industry, after the storm destroyed sugar mills and the rail lines that carried the cane to the mills. The storm destroyed over 100 tobacco drying barns, including their contents. The destruction of the tobacco represented a $30 million loss for the country. High winds also destroyed 96 tobacco storage facilities, although the tobacco was removed beforehand. In Güines near Havana, Alma destroyed food crops, which further exacerbated Cuba's existing food shortages. Alma's passage also resulted in water shortages, prompting the government to urge residents to use less water. There was heavy structural damage across western Cuba, including in Havana, Matanzas, Camagüey, Pinar del Río, and Las Villas. The hurricane destroyed 1,083 houses, and overall damage was estimated at $200 million. Alma killed 12 people in the country and injured 78 others. In the storm's aftermath, Cuban officials sent about 100,000 people from Havana to the cities around the capital to repair storm damage. Such forced labor was a complaint about the rule of Fidel Castro, after the food and supply shortages.

=== United States ===
==== Florida ====
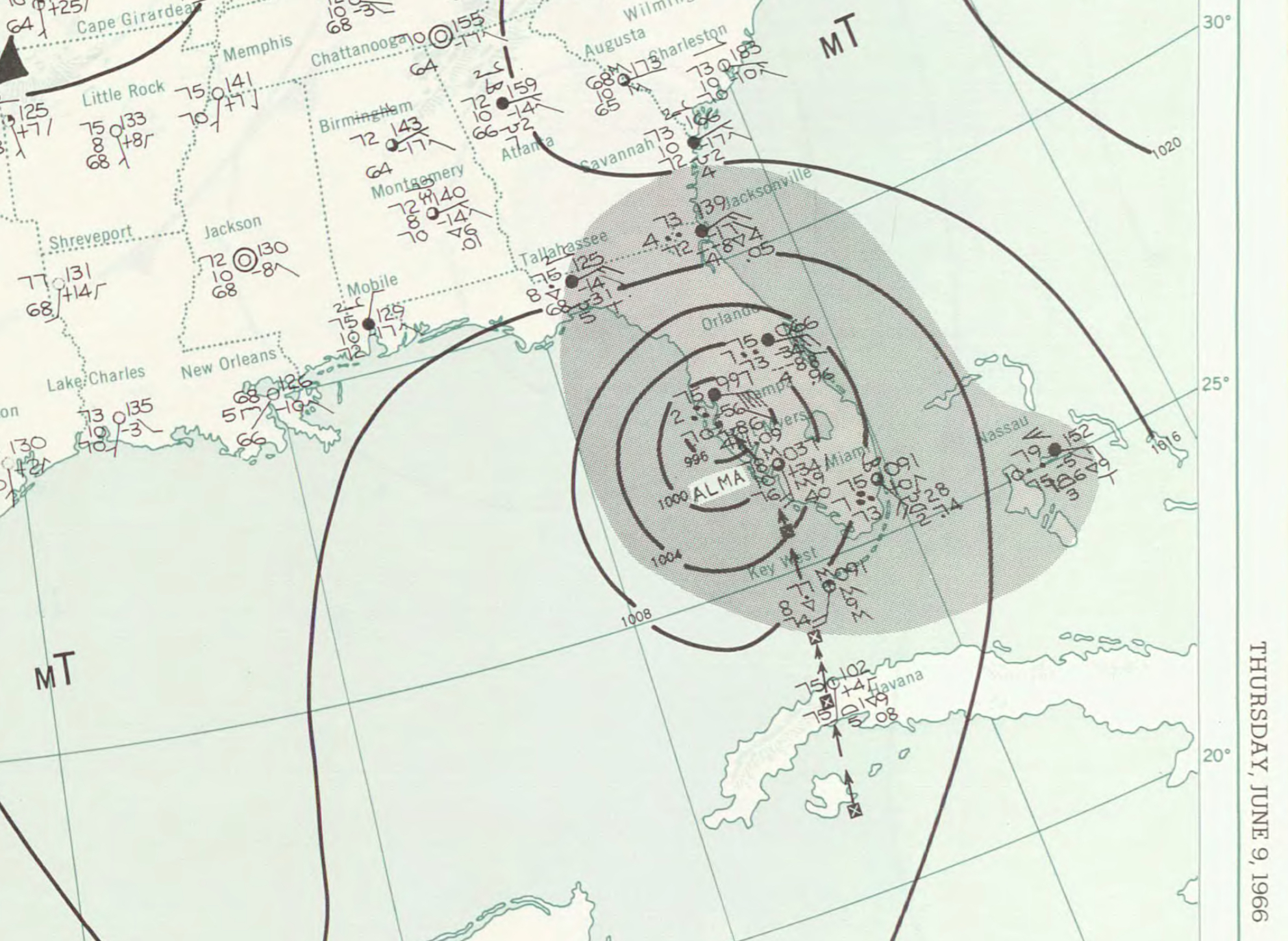
Surface weather analysis of Hurricane Alma several hours after peak intensity early on June 9

Hurricane Alma affected the entire state of Florida with strong winds and rainfall. While the hurricane passed east of the Dry Tortugas, a station recorded winds of 125 mph (201 km/h), which were the highest winds on land. The station also recorded a pressure of 970 mbar (29 inHg), which was the lowest pressure recorded on land. Wind gusts reached 70 mph (110 km/h) in Key West, causing a power outage. Rising tides flooded streets in the city, including A1A which sustained damage to an adjacent seawall. Damage in the lower Florida Keys was estimated at $300,000. In southwestern Florida, the hurricane heavily damaged the mango crop. High rainfall totals occurred across the state, peaking at 9.94 in (252 mm) in Dania Beach near Miami. There were eight tornadoes or funnel clouds in the state, including one in Dade County that damaged a home. Along the west coast of Pinellas County, the storm damaged the grapefruit crop. High winds, including a gust of 93 mph (150 km/h), caused power outages in the Tampa Bay Area. A wind gust knocked a car off of a bridge between Tampa and St. Petersburg, although the occupants were able to escape safely. As it paralleled the coastline, Alma produced a storm tide of 10 ft (3.0 m) in New Port Richey. The high tides caused significant flooding in Cedar Key. In northern Florida where Alma moved ashore, wind gusts reached 100 mph (160 km/h) in Crawfordville; the high winds damaged the local tobacco crop. There were six deaths, of which two were electrocutions, two were drownings, and two were from heart attacks related to the storm. One of the deaths was a man who had a heart attack while preparing to evacuate. Damage throughout Florida was estimated at $10 million. This was less than other storms of similar intensity, due to the sparse population of the affected area.

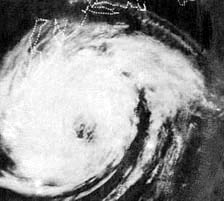
Satellite image of Hurricane Alma east of Cape Hatteras on June 12

==== Georgia ====
Further north, Alma produced 44 mph (71 km/h) wind gusts and 2.18 in (55 mm) in Savannah, Georgia. High winds damaged a few houses and downed trees near Albany, Georgia. The winds overturned a bus at Fort Gordon, injuring 11 soldiers. The storm caused about $50,000 in damage in the state. Effects were minor in South Carolina, although heavy rainfall totalled 7.80 in (198 mm) in Wilmington, North Carolina. Rainfall and increased storm tides extended into Virginia and New Jersey.

== See also ==
- Other storms named Alma
- List of Category 3 Atlantic hurricanes
- List of Cuba hurricanes
- List of Florida hurricanes (1950–1974)
- Labor Day Hurricane (1935) – The strongest and most intense hurricane to ever strike Florida
- Hurricane Audrey (1957) – major hurricane, killed at least 416 people after making landfall in the Texas–Louisiana state line
- Hurricane Dennis (2005) – Category 4 hurricane, caused severe damage along the Florida panhandle after its Category 3 landfall
- Hurricane Michael (2018) – A category 5 hurricane that made landfall on the Florida panhandle at category 5 strength
