= 1964–65 South-West Indian Ocean cyclone season =

Cyclone season in the Southwest Indian Ocean

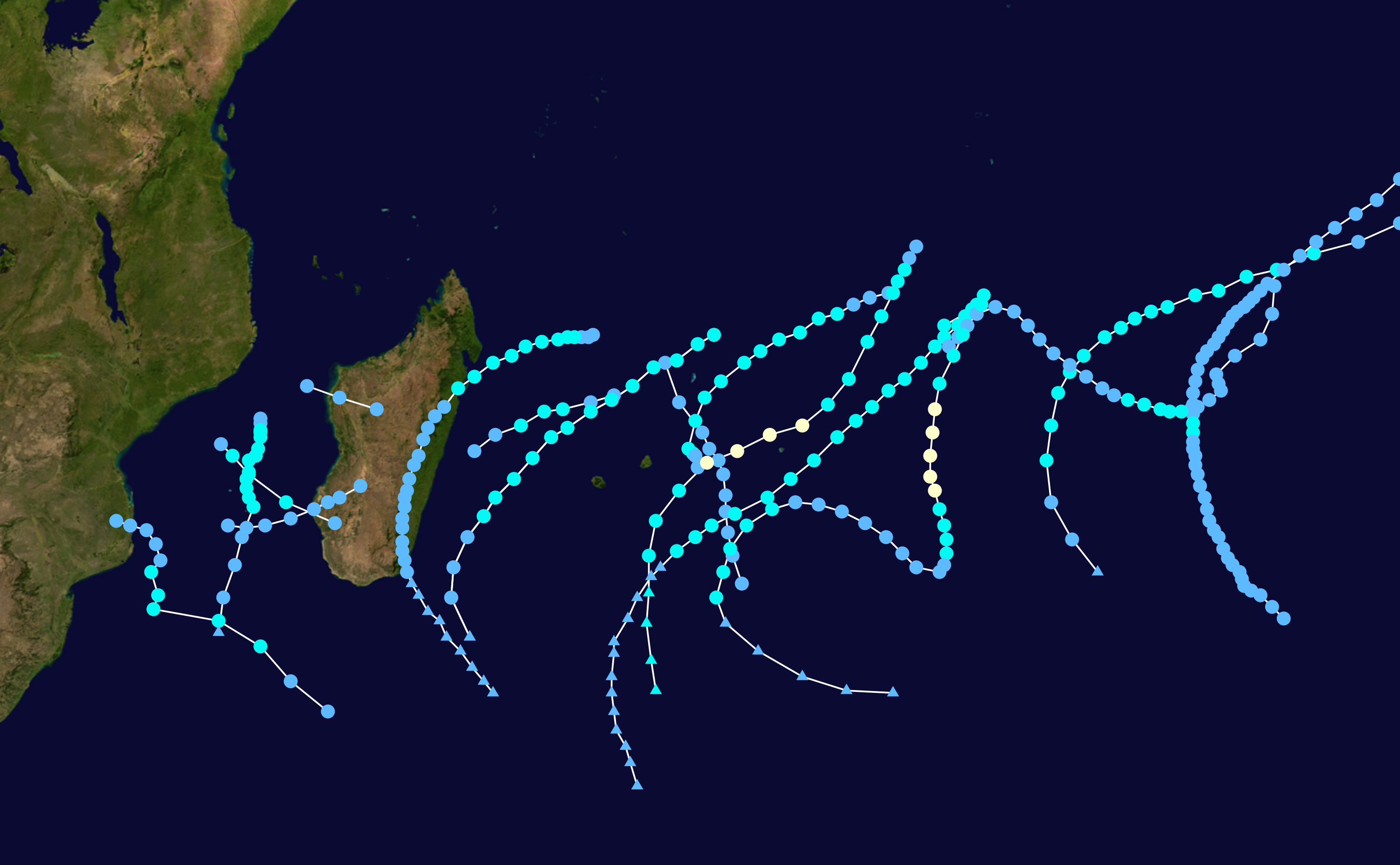
- Season summary map

Seasonal boundaries
- First system formed: December 4, 1964
- Last system dissipated: May 6, 1965

Strongest storm
- Name: Freda
  - Maximum winds: 120 km/h (75 mph) (1-minute sustained)

Seasonal statistics
- Total depressions: 14
- Total storms: 11
- Tropical cyclones: 2
- Total fatalities: Unknown
- Total damage: Unknown

Related articles
- 1964–65 Australian region cyclone season; 1964–65 South Pacific cyclone season

The 1964–65 South-West Indian Ocean cyclone season was an active cyclone season. Although it was not the most active South-West Indian Ocean cyclone season, it had the most named storms, reaching the letter R.

== Systems ==
=== Tropical Disturbance Arlette ===
- Tropical disturbance (MFR)
- Tropical depression (SSHWS)
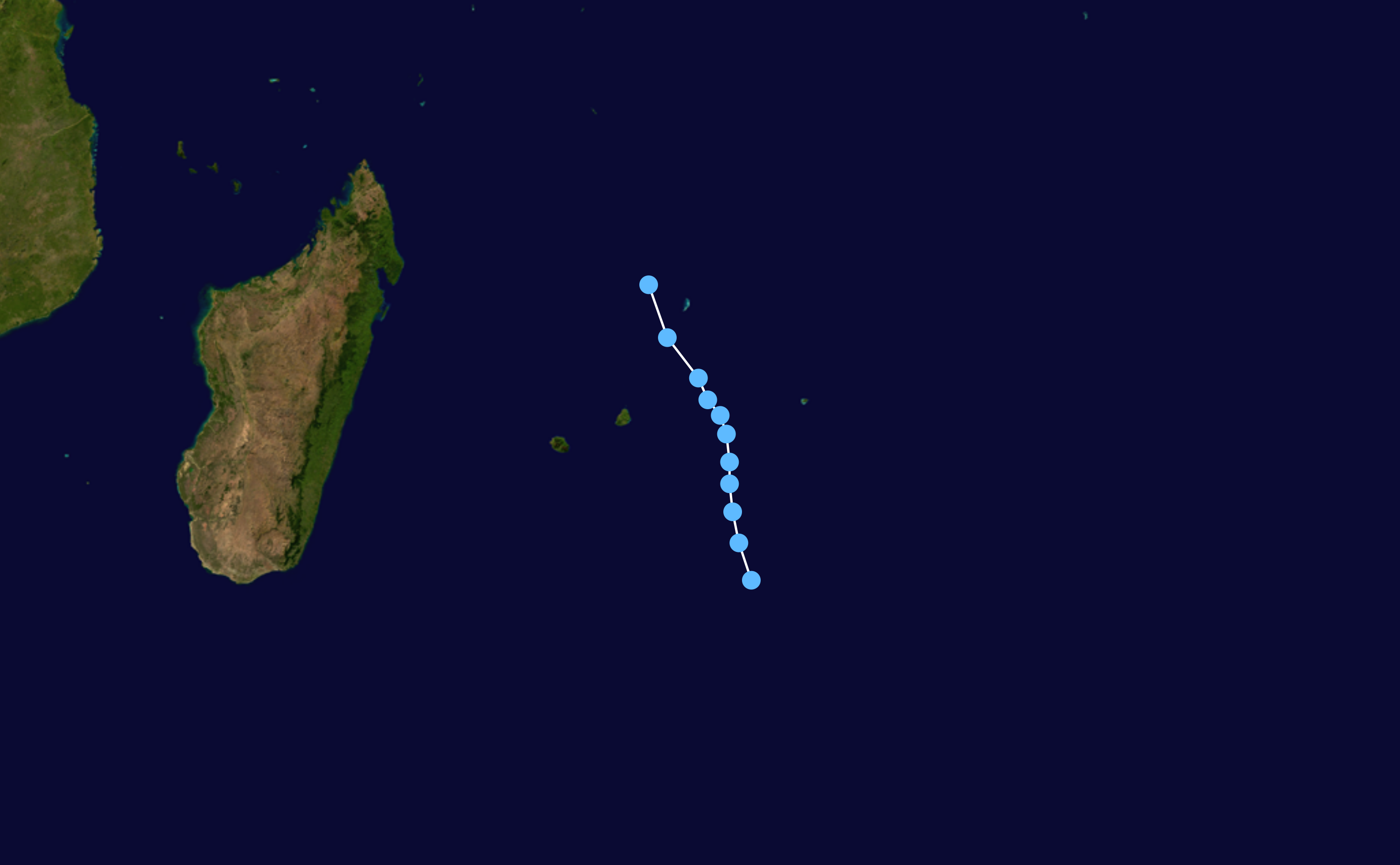
- Duration: December 4 – December 8
- Peak intensity: 45 km/h (30 mph) (10-min);

Arlette existed from December 4 to December 8.

=== Moderate Tropical Storm Bessie ===
- Moderate tropical storm (MFR)
- Tropical storm (SSHWS)
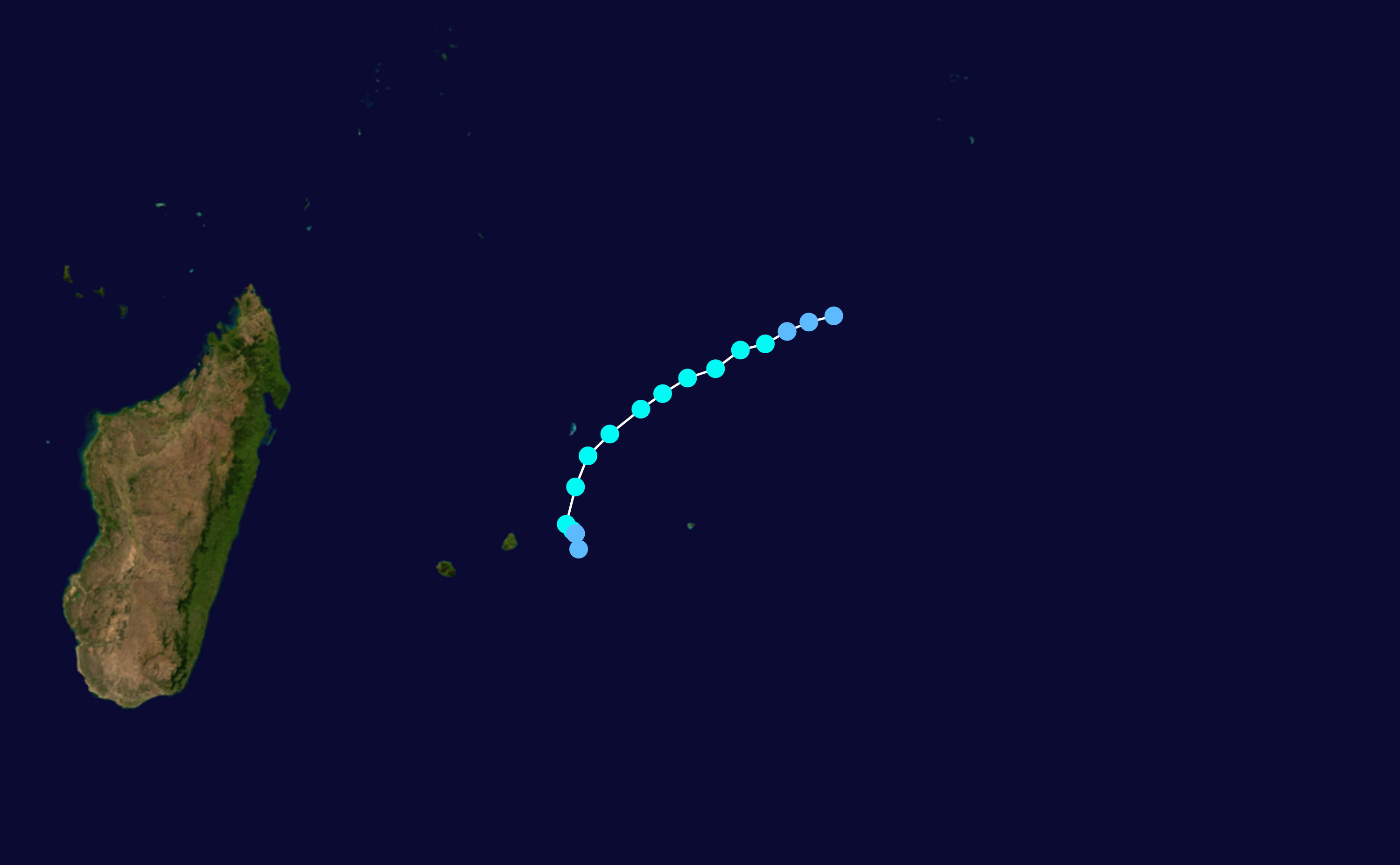
- Duration: December 7 – December 11
- Peak intensity: 85 km/h (50 mph) (10-min);

Bessie existed from December 7 to December 11.

=== Moderate Tropical Storm Connie ===
- Moderate tropical storm (MFR)
- Tropical storm (SSHWS)
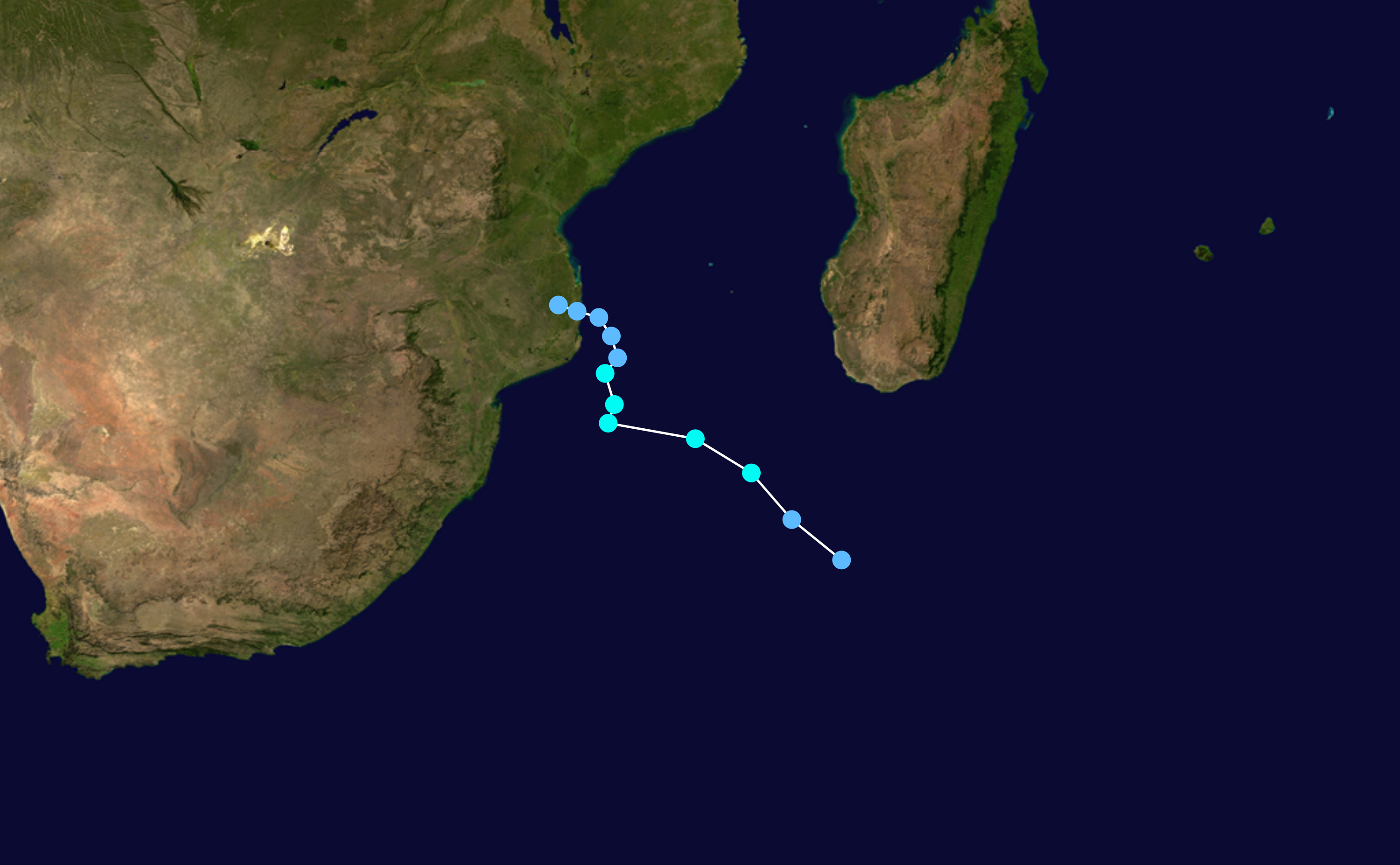
- Duration: December 17 – December 21
- Peak intensity: 75 km/h (45 mph) (10-min);

Connie existed from December 17 to December 21.

=== Tropical Disturbance Doreen ===
- Tropical disturbance (MFR)
- Tropical depression (SSHWS)
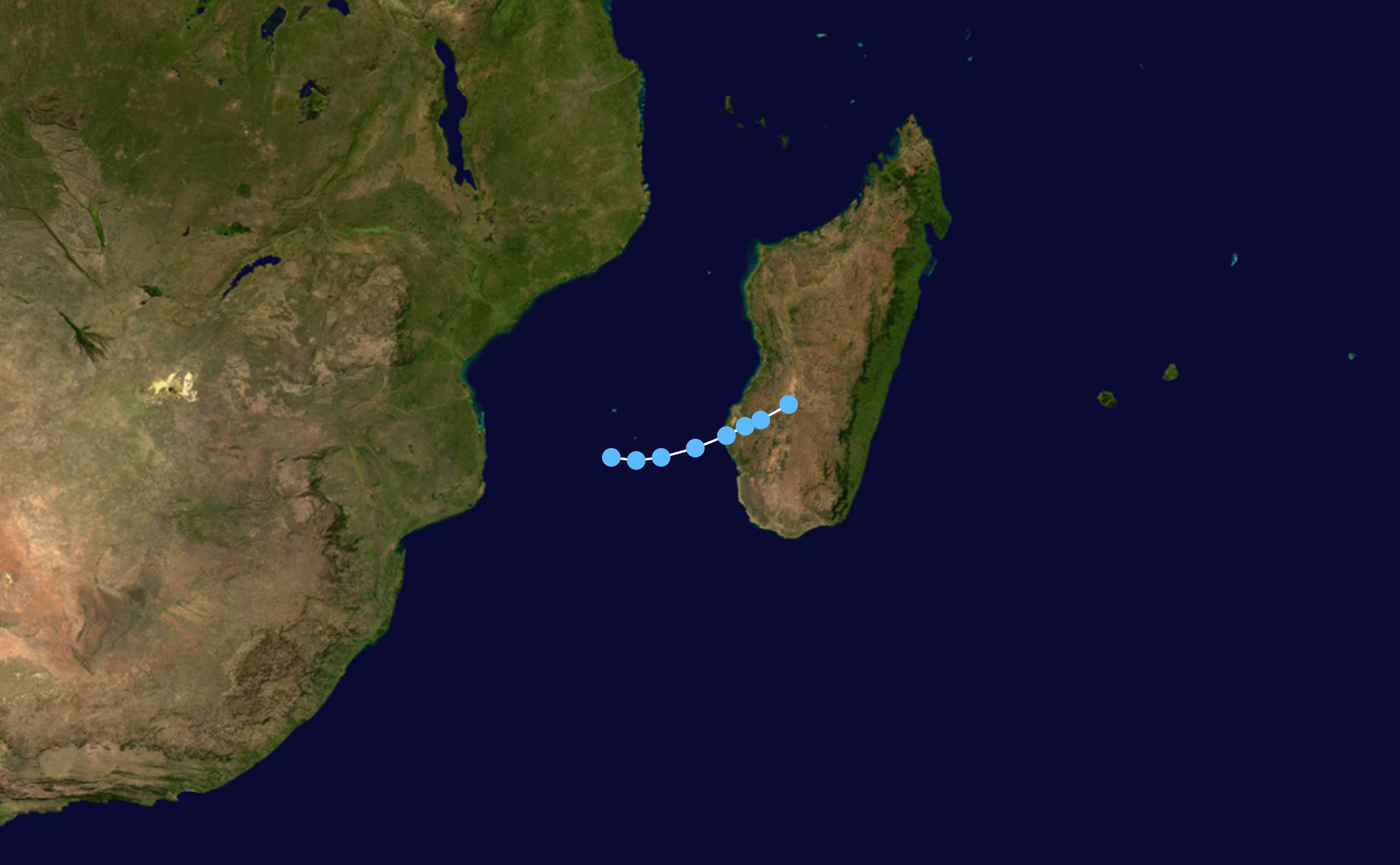
- Duration: December 23 – December 25
- Peak intensity: 45 km/h (30 mph) (10-min);

Doreen existed from December 23 to December 25.

=== Moderate Tropical Storm Edna ===
- Moderate tropical storm (MFR)
- Tropical storm (SSHWS)
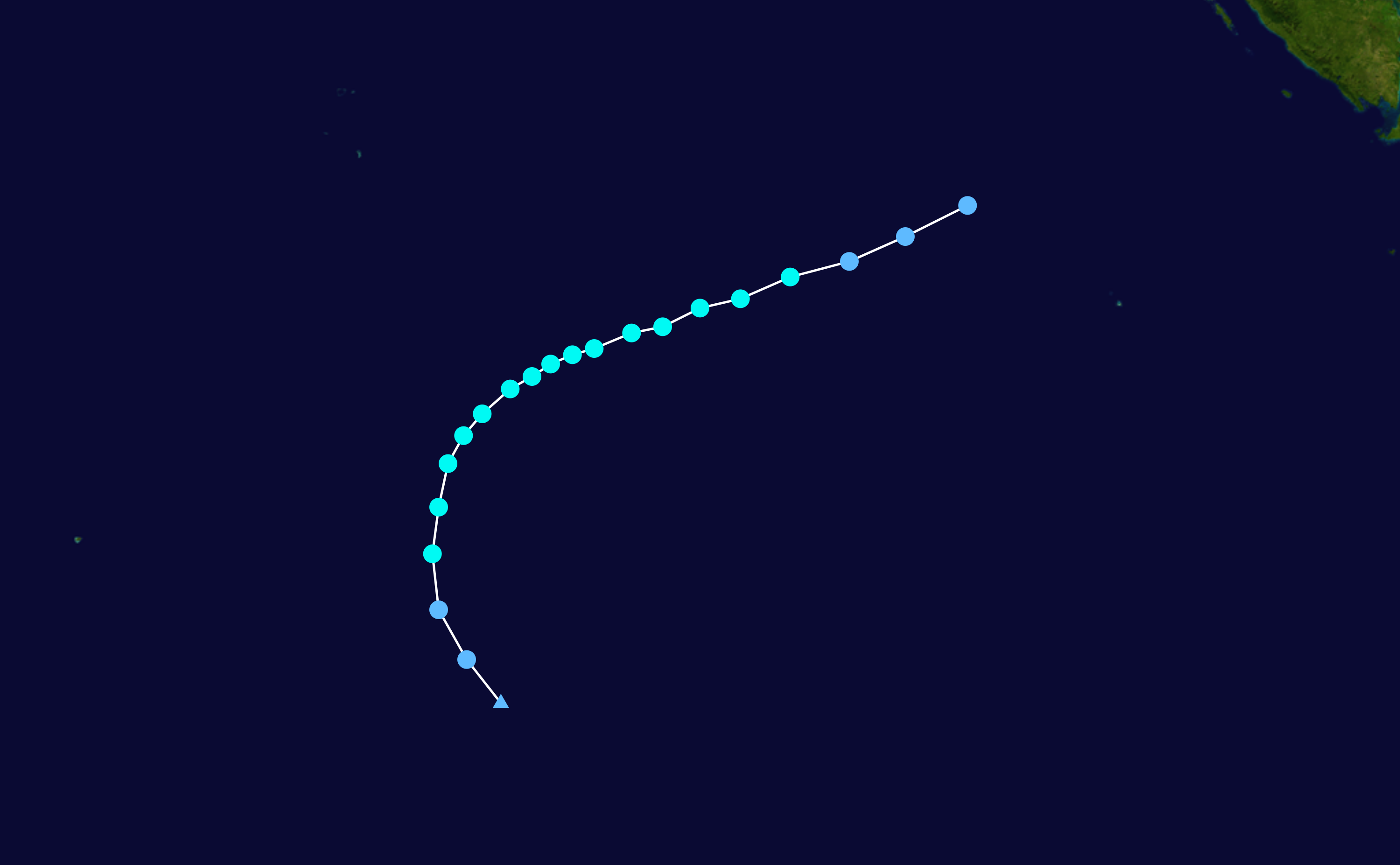
- Duration: December 22 – December 27
- Peak intensity: 75 km/h (45 mph) (10-min);

Edna existed from December 22 to December 27.

=== Tropical Cyclone Freda ===
- Tropical cyclone (MFR)
- Category 1 tropical cyclone (SSHWS)
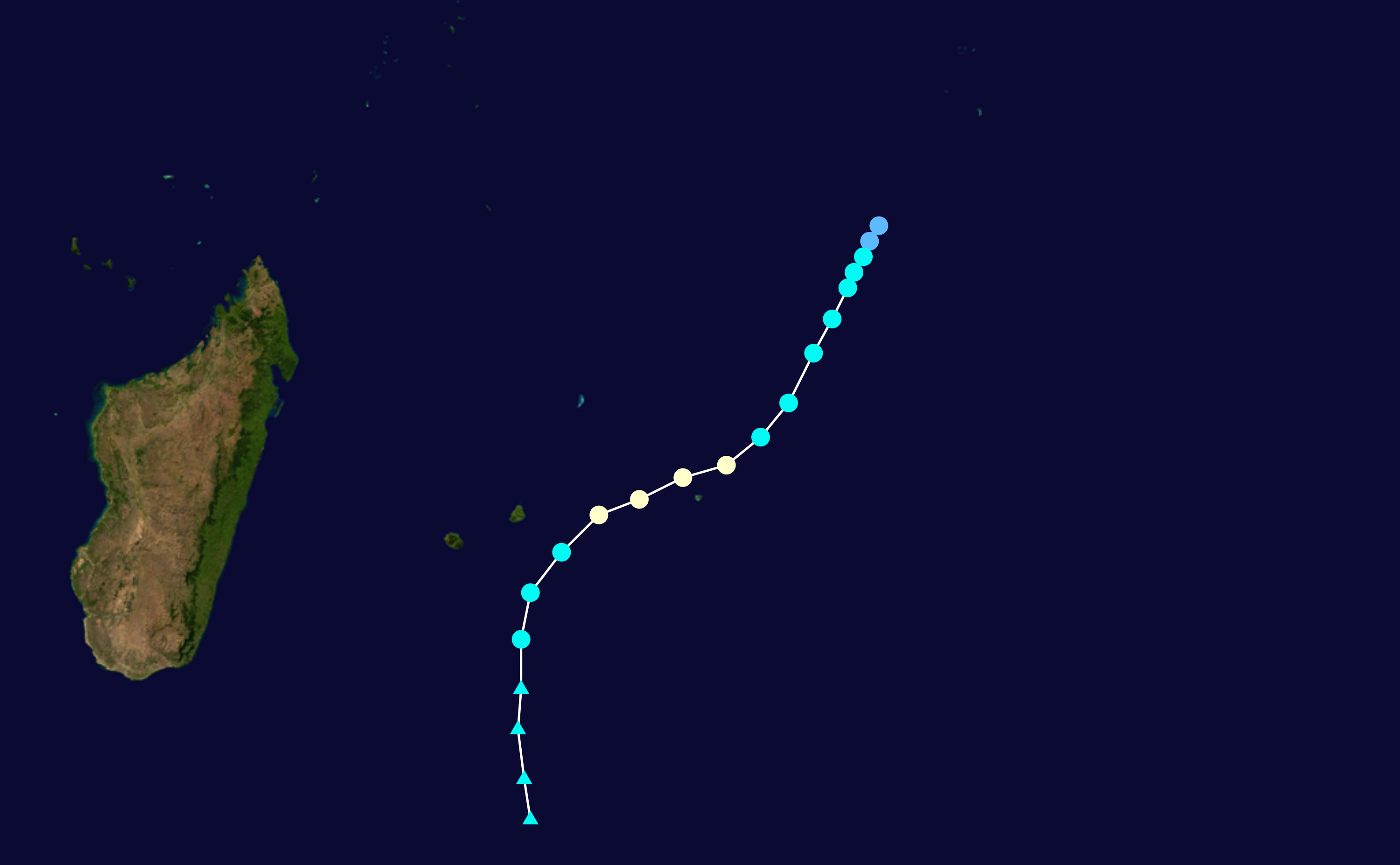
- Duration: January 5 – January 10
- Peak intensity: 120 km/h (75 mph) (10-min);

Freda existed from January 5 to January 10. On January 7, Severe Tropical Storm Freda passed between Rodrigues and Mauritius, generating wind gusts of 160 km/h (99 mph) on Rodrigues.

=== Moderate Tropical Storm Ginette ===
- Moderate tropical storm (MFR)
- Tropical storm (SSHWS)
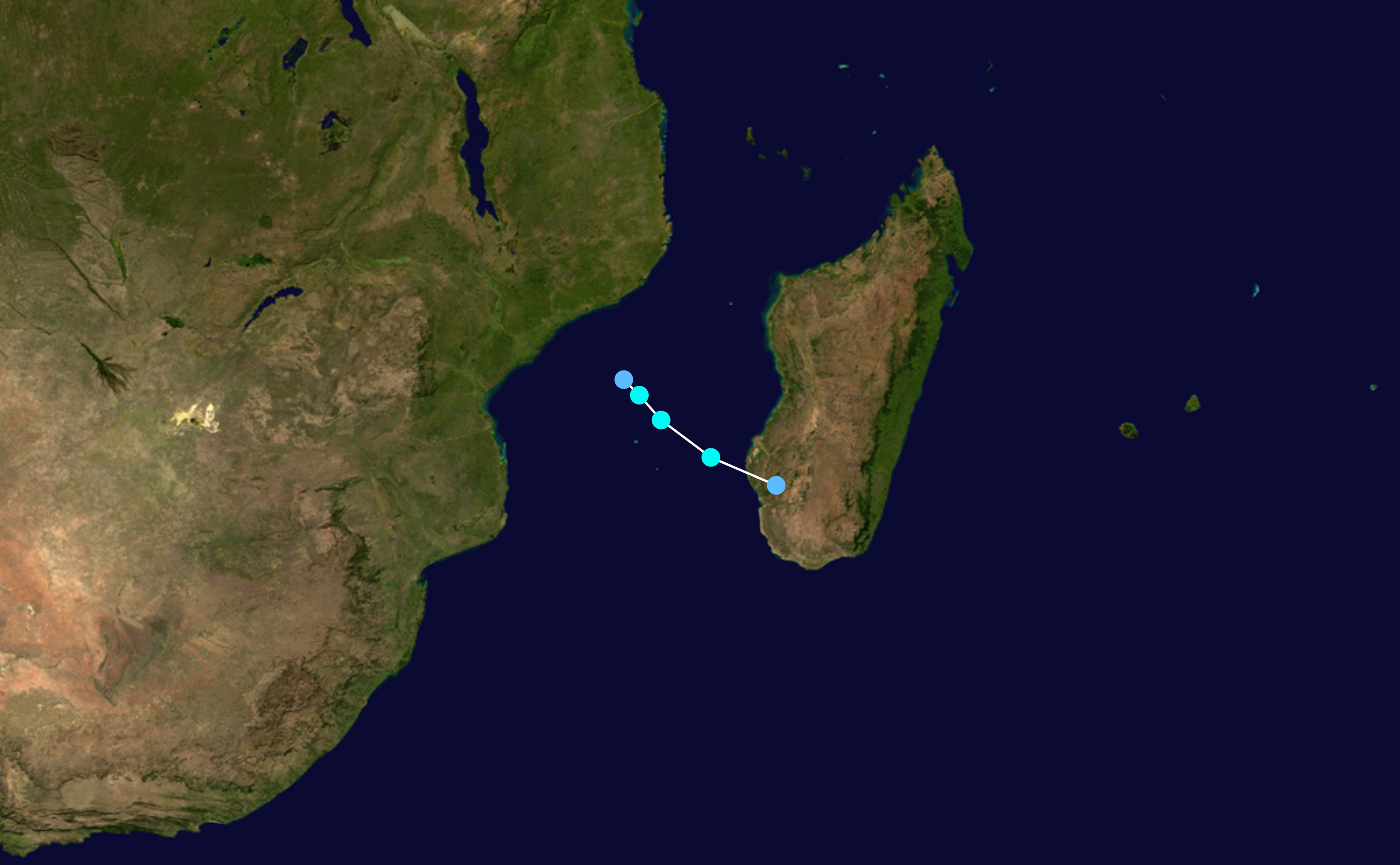
- Duration: January 6 – January 7
- Peak intensity: 65 km/h (40 mph) (10-min);

Ginette existed from January 6 to January 7.

=== Tropical Disturbance Hazel ===
- Tropical disturbance (MFR)
- Tropical depression (SSHWS)
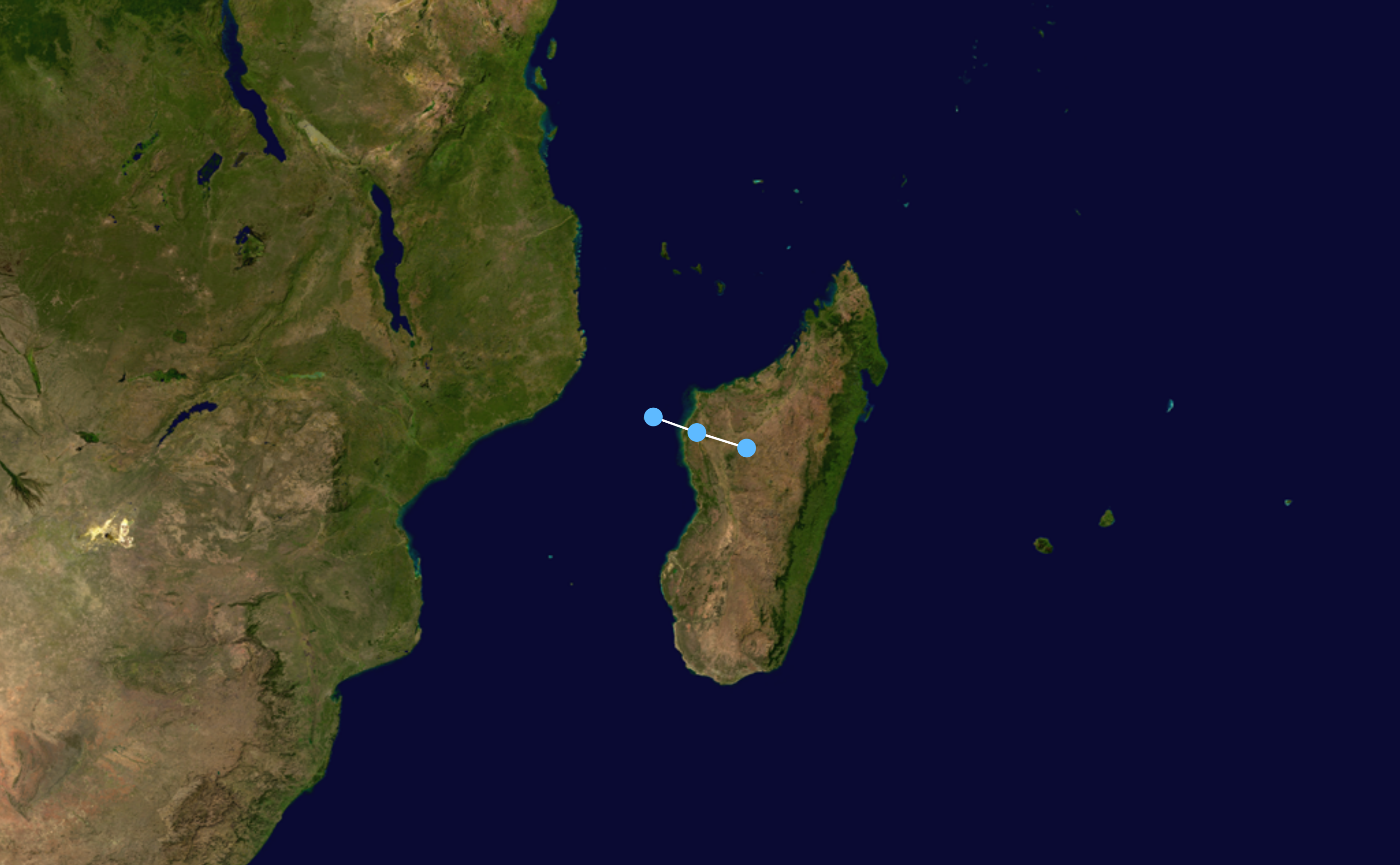
- Duration: January 15 – January 15
- Peak intensity: 45 km/h (30 mph) (10-min);

Hazel existed on January 15.

=== Moderate Tropical Storm Iris ===
- Moderate tropical storm (MFR)
- Tropical storm (SSHWS)
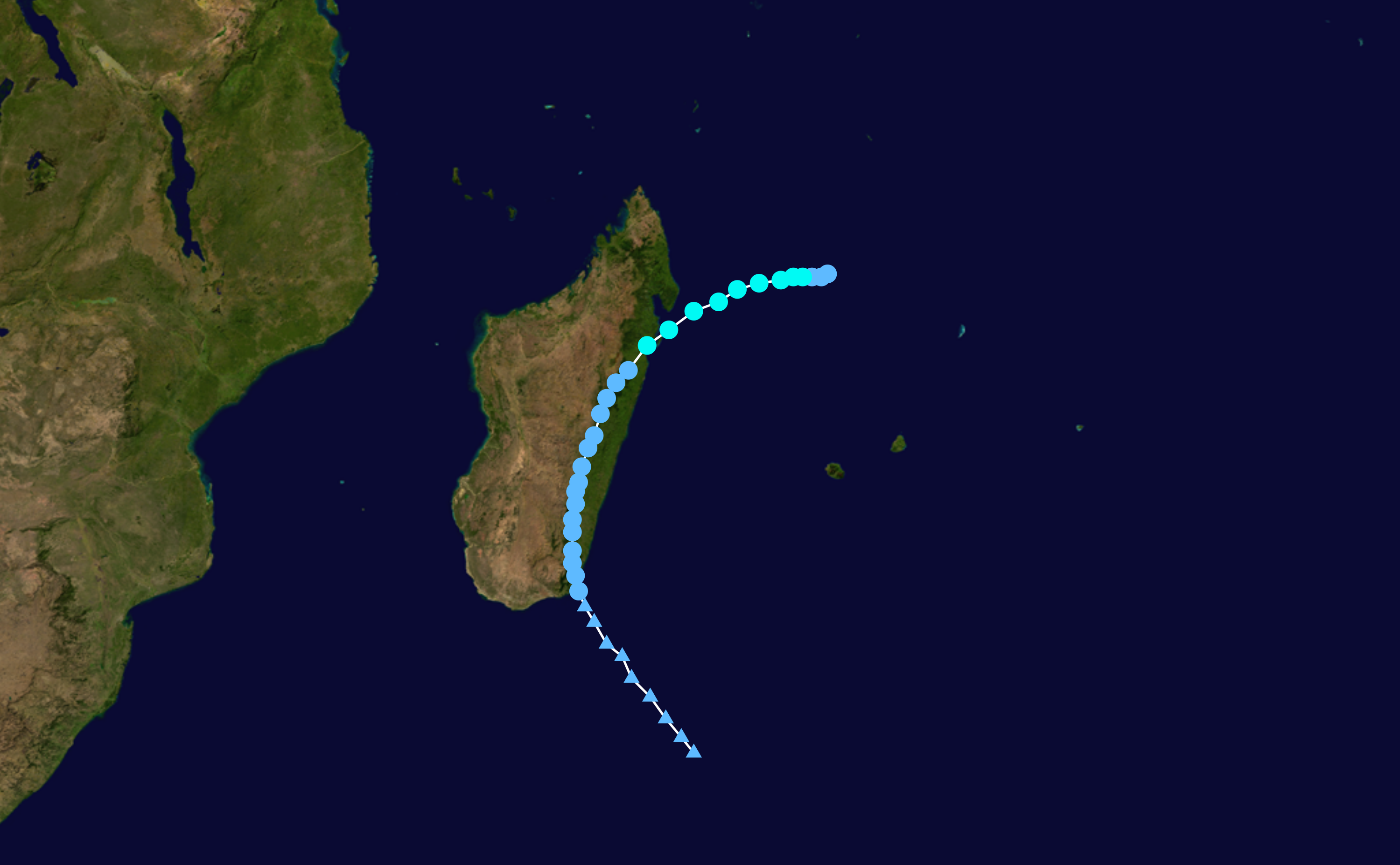
- Duration: January 17 – January 28
- Peak intensity: 75 km/h (45 mph) (10-min);

Iris existed from January 17 to January 28.

=== Moderate Tropical Storm Judy ===
- Moderate tropical storm (MFR)
- Tropical storm (SSHWS)
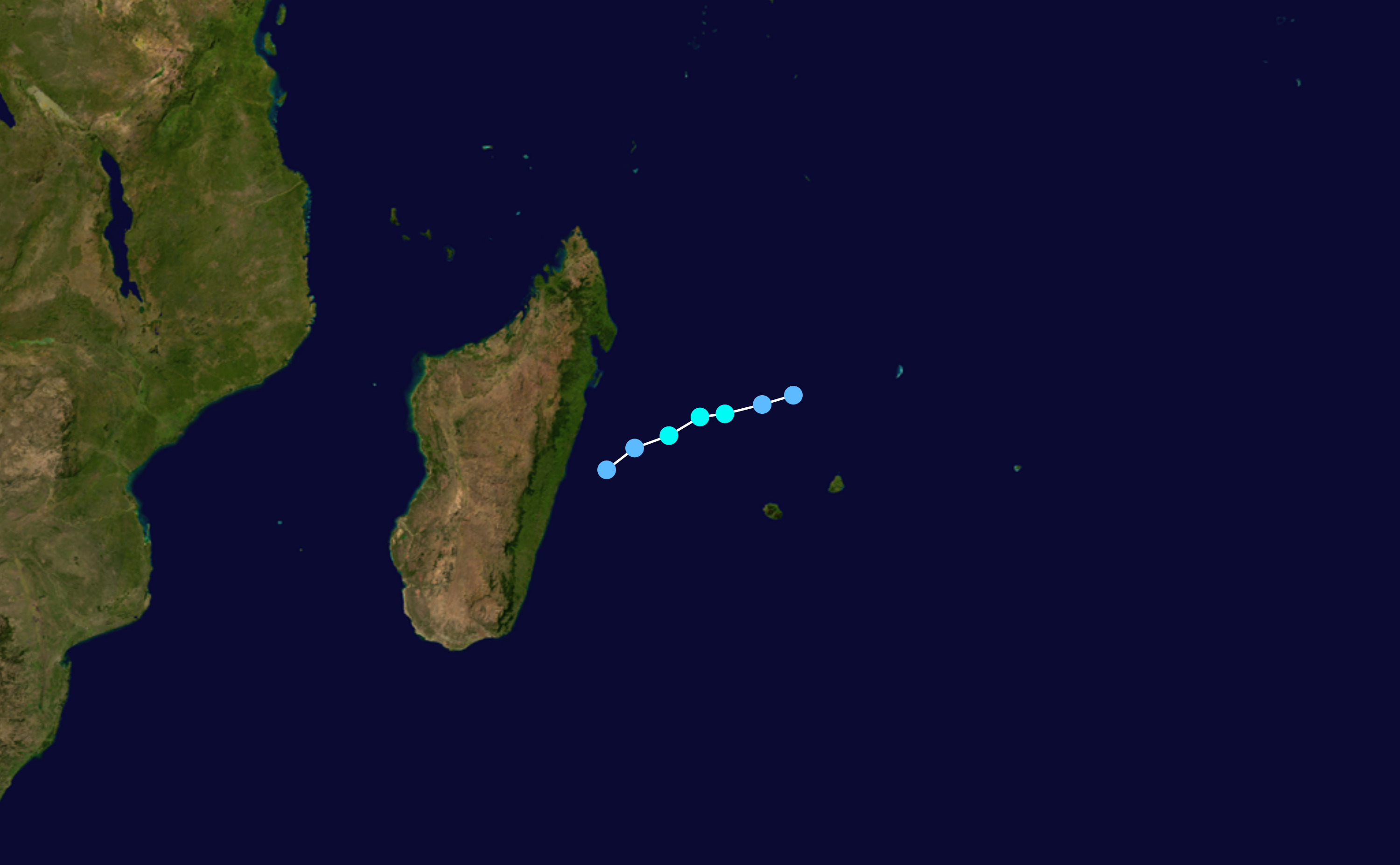
- Duration: February 6 – February 9
- Peak intensity: 65 km/h (40 mph) (10-min);

Judy existed from February 6 to February 9.

=== Moderate Tropical Storm Kathleen ===
- Moderate tropical storm (MFR)
- Tropical storm (SSHWS)
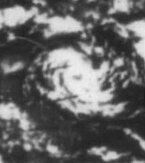
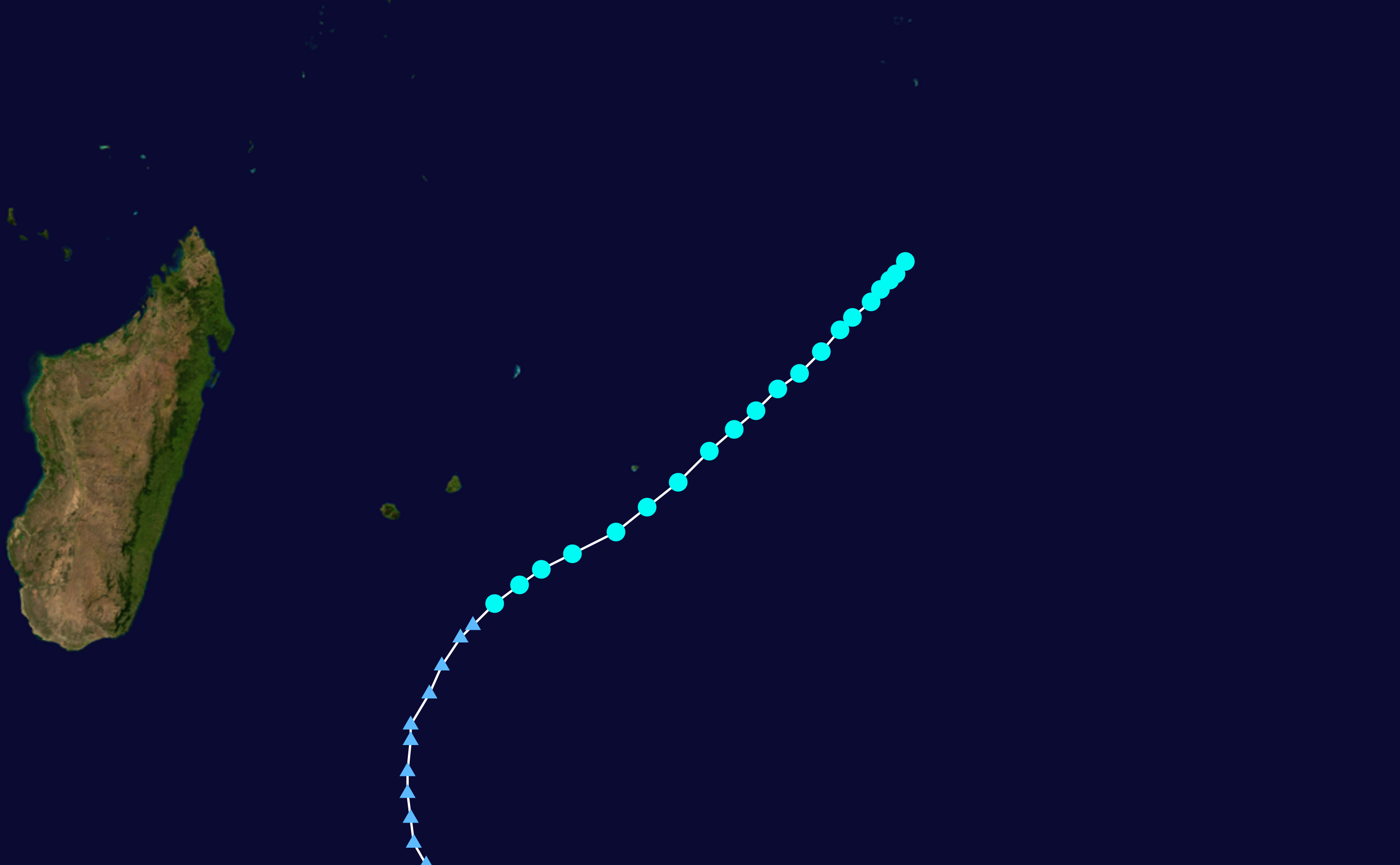
- Duration: February 10 – February 20
- Peak intensity: 85 km/h (50 mph) (10-min);

Kathleen existed from February 10 to February 20. Kathleen passed southeast of Rodrigues on February 16, generating high waves that reached 3.5 m (11 ft) along the island's southern coast.

=== Moderate Tropical Storm Lesley ===
- Moderate tropical storm (MFR)
- Tropical storm (SSHWS)
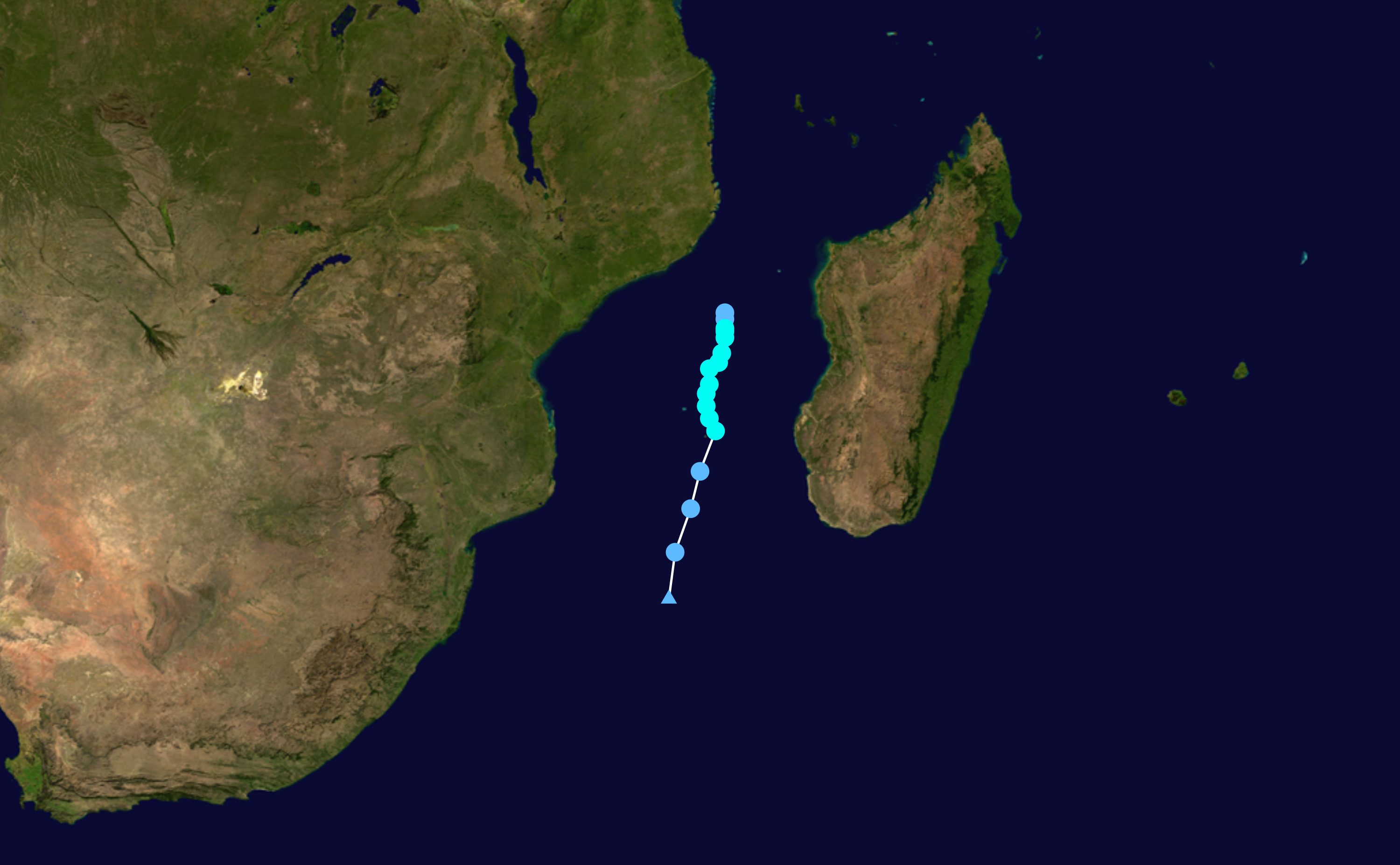
- Duration: February 20 – February 25
- Peak intensity: 75 km/h (45 mph) (10-min);

Lesley existed from February 20 to February 25.

=== Tropical Disturbance Maureen ===
- Tropical disturbance (MFR)
- Duration: February 22 – February 22
- Peak intensity: 35 km/h (25 mph) (10-min);

Maureen existed on February 22.

=== Tropical Disturbance Nancy ===
- Tropical disturbance (MFR)
- Duration: February 23 – February 23
- Peak intensity: 35 km/h (25 mph) (10-min);

Nancy existed on February 23.

=== Tropical Cyclone Gay–Olive–Peggy ===
- Tropical cyclone (MFR)
- Category 1 tropical cyclone (SSHWS)
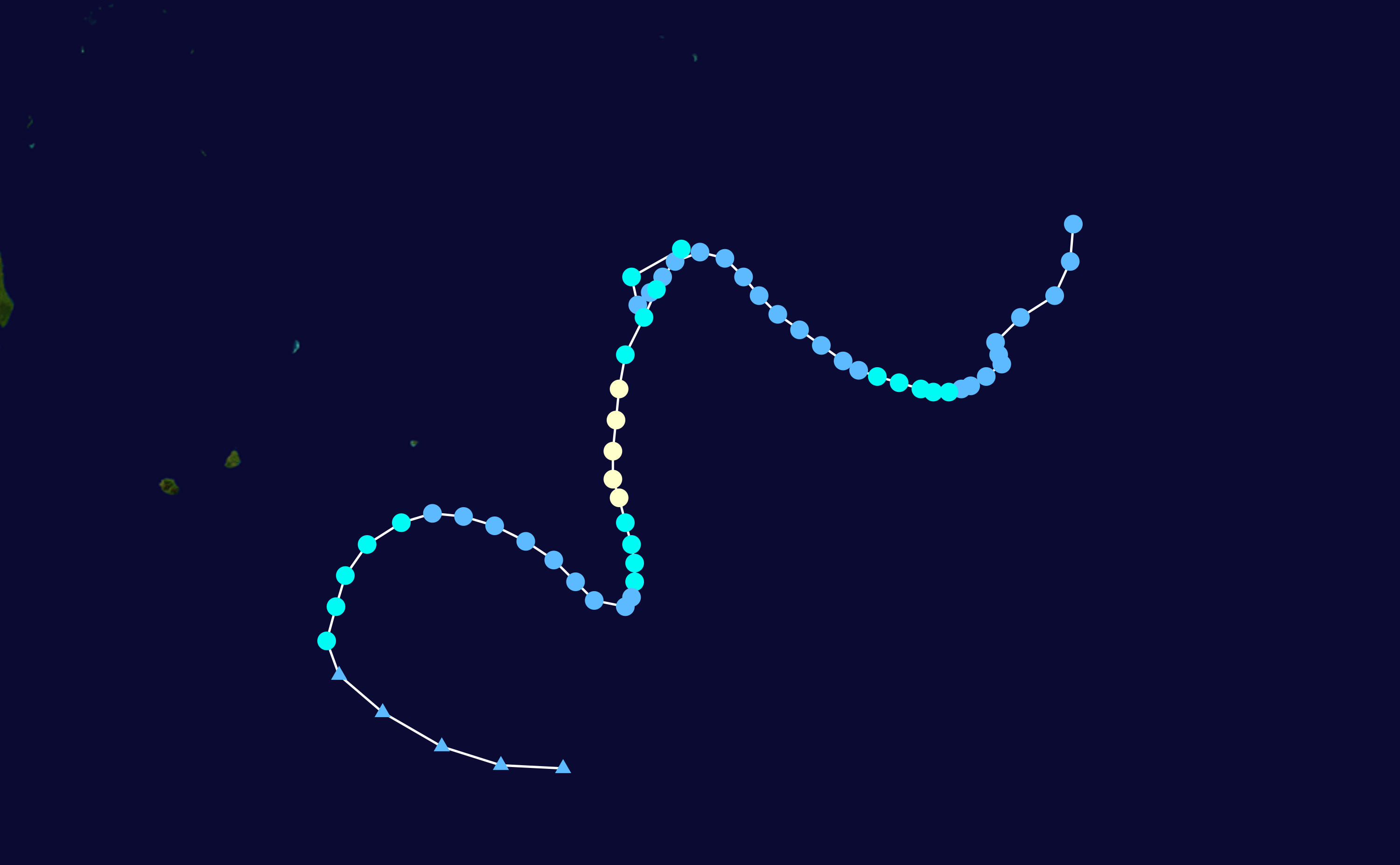
- Duration: February 24 – March 7
- Peak intensity: 120 km/h (75 mph) (10-min);

Olive existed from February 24 to March 10. On March 4, Olive passed south of Rodrigues as a tropical depression. It produced high seas and scattered thunderstorms as far west as Réunion. Later, it reintensified and was renamed Peggy.

=== Moderate Tropical Storm Rose ===
- Moderate tropical storm (MFR)
- Tropical storm (SSHWS)
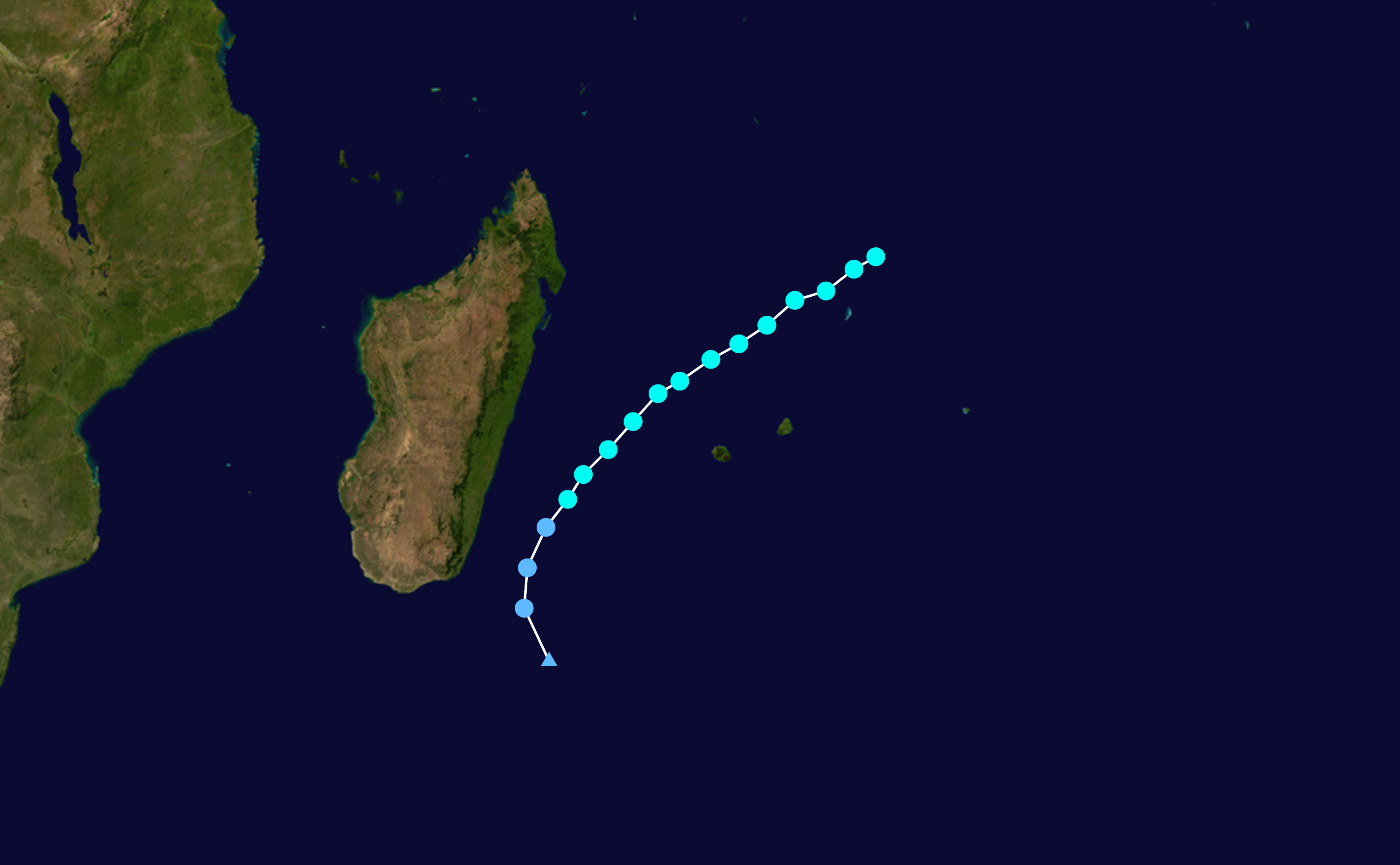
- Duration: April 27 – May 6
- Peak intensity: 75 km/h (45 mph) (10-min);

Rose existed from April 27 to May 6. On May 3, Rose passed west of Réunion, producing wind gusts of 65 km/h (40 mph), along with heavy rainfall reaching 635 mm (25.0 in) at Plaine des Palmistes. The rains caused a landslide along the Rivière des Remparts.

== Season effects ==
This table lists all of the tropical cyclones that were monitored during the 1964–1965 South-West Indian Ocean cyclone season. Information on their intensity, duration, name, primarily comes from RSMC La Réunion.

Name	Dates	Peak intensity		Areas affected	Damage (USD)	Deaths	Ref(s).
Name	Dates	Category	Wind speed	Areas affected	Damage (USD)	Deaths	Ref(s).
Arlette	4–8 December	Tropical disturbance	45 km/h (30 mph)	None	None	None	
Bessie	7–11 December	Moderate tropical storm	85 km/h (50 mph)	None	None	None	
Connie	17–21 December	Moderate tropical storm	75 km/h (45 mph)	None	None	None	
Doreen	23–25 December	Tropical disturbance	45 km/h (30 mph)	None	None	None	
Edna	22–27 December	Moderate tropical storm	75 km/h (45 mph)	None	None	None	
Freda	5–10 January	Tropical cyclone	120 km/h (75 mph)	Rodrigues, Réunion	Unknown	None	
Ginette	5–7 January	Moderate tropical storm	65 km/h (40 mph)}	None	None	None	
Hazel	15 January	Tropical disturbance	45 km/h (30 mph)	None	None	None	
Iris	17–28 January	Moderate tropical storm	75 km/h (45 mph)	None	None	None	
Judy	6–9 February	Moderate tropical storm	65 km/h (40 mph)	None	None	None	
Kathleen	10–20 February	Moderate tropical storm	85 km/h (50 mph)	Diego Garcia, Mascarene Islands	Unknown	None	
Lesley	20–25 February	Moderate tropical storm	75 km/h (45 mph)	None	None	None	
Maureen	22 February	Tropical disturbance	35 km/h (25 mph)	None	None	None	
Nancy	23 February	Tropical disturbance	35 km/h (25 mph)	None	None	None	
Gay–Olive–Peggy	24 February–7 March	Tropical cyclone	120 km/h (75 mph)	Mascarene Islands	Unknown	None	
Rose	27 April–6 May	Moderate tropical storm	75 km/h (45 mph)	St. Brandon, Mascarene Islands	Unknown	None	
Season aggregates
16 systems	4 December 1964 – 6 May 1965		120 km/h (75 mph)		Unknown	None	

== See also ==
- Atlantic hurricane seasons: 1964, 1965
- Eastern Pacific hurricane seasons: 1964, 1965
- Western Pacific typhoon seasons: 1964, 1965
- North Indian Ocean cyclone seasons: 1964, 1965
