= Rivière des Remparts – Rivière Langevin Important Bird Area =

Tract of land on Réunion, France

Coordinates: 21°20′S 55°38′E

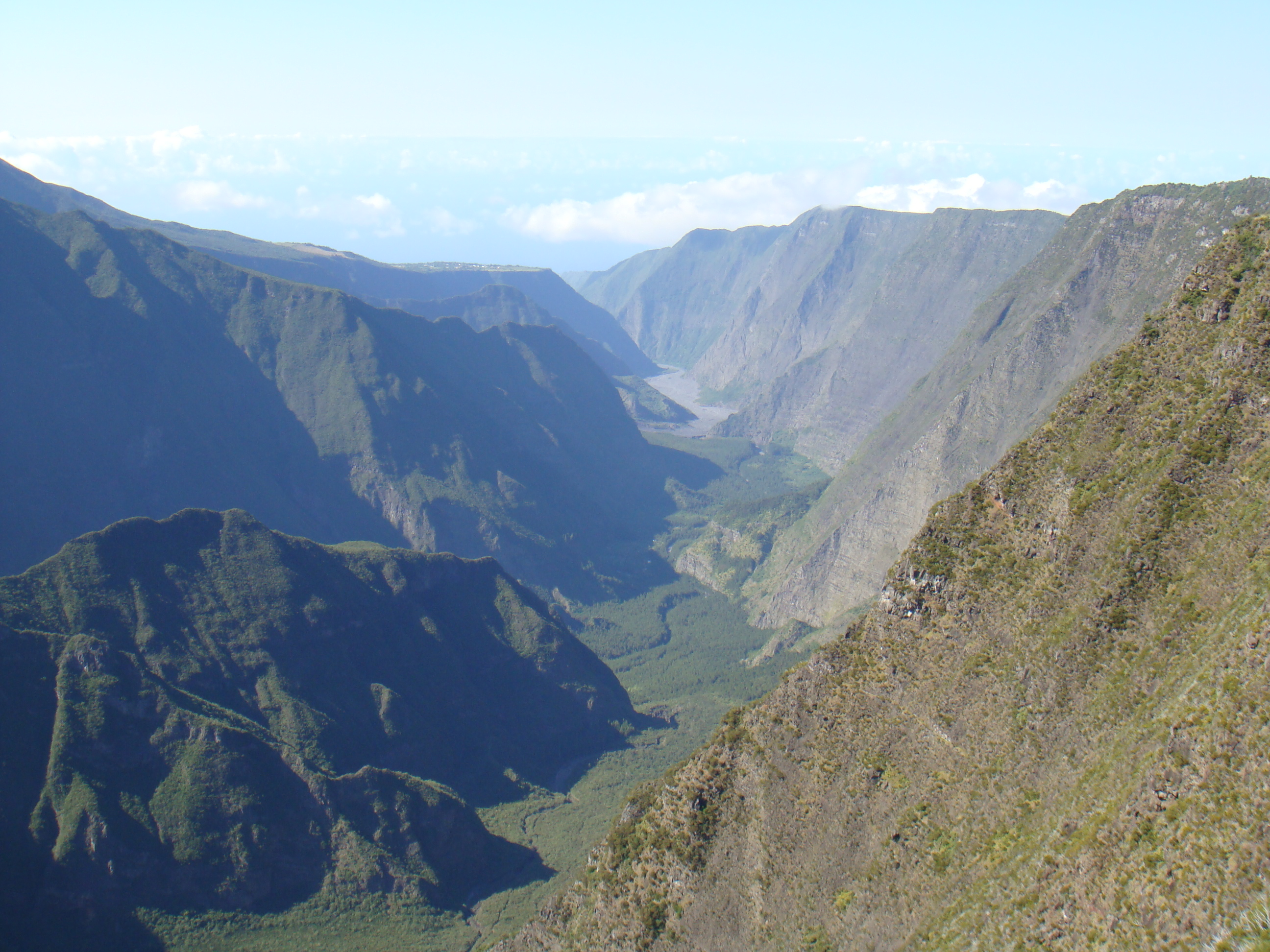
The gorge of the Rivière des Remparts

Rivière des Remparts – Rivière Langevin Important Bird Area (IBA) is a 7000 ha tract of land on the island of Réunion, a French territory in the western Indian Ocean.

== Description ==
The IBA lies at the southern end of the island in the commune of Saint Joseph, extending over a wide altitude range of 100–2320 m above sea level. It comprises the river gorges of the Rivière des Remparts and the Rivière Langevin which extend southwards from the western side of the volcanic Piton de la Fournaise massif to the sea at the town of Saint-Joseph. The gorges are separated by a narrow strip of cultivated plateau and a narrow uncultivated ridge. The site contains native plant communities, including evergreen lowland forest, mountain forest, alpine shrubland, and rocky cliffs.

=== Birds ===
The site has been identified by BirdLife International as an Important Bird Area because it supports a colony of tropical shearwaters (with 300 breeding pairs), as well as populations of Réunion harriers, Mascarene swiftlets, Mascarene paradise flycatchers, Réunion bulbuls, Mascarene white-eyes, Réunion olive white-eyes, and Réunion stonechats.
