= Rivière des Remparts =

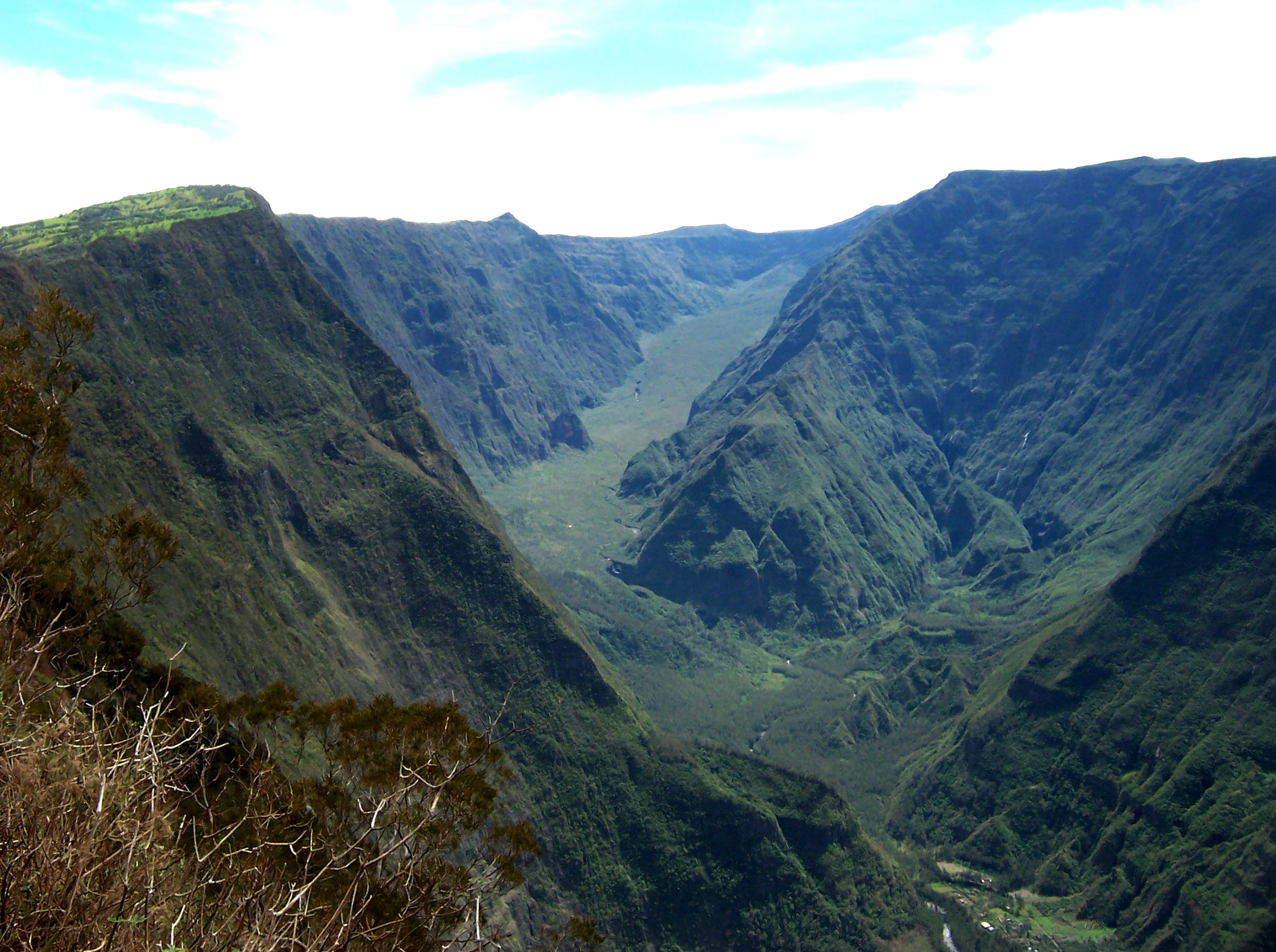
- Rivière des Remparts valley upstream of Roche-Plate

Location
- Country: France
- Region: Réunion

Physical characteristics
- Mouth: Indian Ocean
  - coordinates: 21°23′8″S 55°37′7″E
- Length: 27.1 km (16.8 mi)

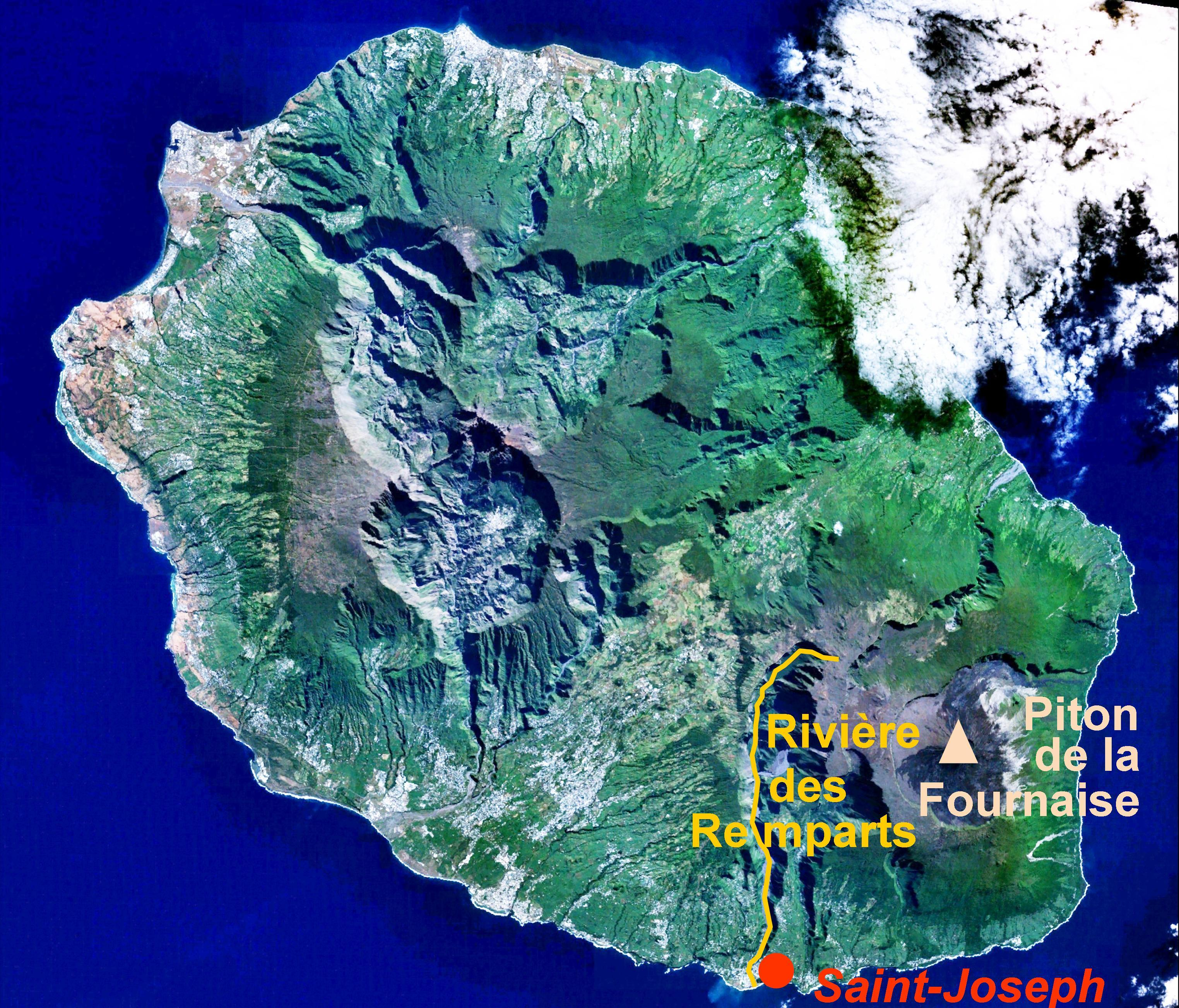
Rivière des Remparts

The Rivière des Remparts is a river on the Indian Ocean island of Réunion. It is 27.1 km (16.8 mi) long. It flows south from the slopes of the Piton des Songes, in a deep caldera along the Piton de la Fournaise, reaching the sea at the town of Saint-Joseph. It forms part of the Rivière des Remparts – Rivière Langevin Important Bird Area.
