= Tropical cyclones by year =

The following is a list of tropical cyclones by year. Since the year 957, there have been at least 12,791 recorded tropical and subtropical cyclones in the Atlantic, Pacific, and Indian oceans, which are known as basins. Collectively, tropical cyclones caused more than US$1.2 trillion in damage, unadjusted for inflation, and have killed more than 2.6 million people. Most of these deaths were caused by a few deadly cyclones, including the 1737 Calcutta cyclone, the 1839 Coringa cyclone, the 1931 Shanghai typhoon, the 1970 Bhola cyclone, Typhoon Nina in 1975, the 1991 Bangladesh cyclone, and Cyclone Nargis in 2008.

In the North Atlantic Ocean, there have been 2,463 tropical cyclones, including at least 1,150 hurricanes, which have maximum sustained winds of at least 64 knots (74 mph, 119 km/h). The storms collectively killed more than 180,000 people. In the eastern Pacific Ocean, there have been 1,318 tropical cyclones, including 554 hurricanes; the storms collectively contained killed over 8,000 people. In the western Pacific Ocean, there have been 4,653 tropical cyclones, including at least 1,485 typhoons; the storms collectively killed more than 1.4 million people. In the North Indian Ocean, there have been at least 1,553 tropical cyclones, including 262 that attained the equivalent of hurricane status; the storms collectively killed over 1 million people. There has also been over 2,500 tropical cyclones in the Southern Hemisphere.

== Table of cyclones ==
=== Pre-1800s ===
Year	Basin	Number of tropical cyclones	Number of named storms (Note: Tropical cyclones have been named throughout most of the world since the 1960s, and worldwide since 2004.)	≥64 knots (Note: Tropical cyclones with maximum sustained winds of at 64 knots (74 mph, 119 km/h) has been considered a "hurricane" on the Beaufort scale since it was designed by Admiral Sir Francis Beaufort by 1806, and is now classified a Category 1 on the Saffir–Simpson scale in the Atlantic and East Pacific Ocean, a typhoon in the West Pacific Ocean, a very severe cyclonic storm in the North Indian Ocean, a tropical cyclone in the South-West Indian Ocean, and a Category 3 on the Australian tropical cyclone intensity scale used for storms near Australia and in the South Pacific Ocean.) (74 mph, 119 km/h) sustained winds	Strongest storm	Deaths	Damage US$	Retired names	Notes
957	Western Pacific	1	1	1		10,000			
1245	Western Pacific	1	1	1		10,000			
1281	Western Pacific	1	1	1		45,000			
1494	Atlantic	1							Included the first Atlantic hurricane observed by Europeans
1495	Atlantic	1							
1500	Atlantic	2							
1502	Atlantic	1							
1504	Atlantic	1							
1508	Atlantic	2							
1509	Atlantic	1							
1511	Atlantic	1							
1514	Atlantic	1							
1515	Atlantic	1							
1519	Atlantic	1							
1520	Atlantic	1							
1523	Atlantic	1							
1525	Atlantic	2							
1526	Atlantic	2							
1527	Atlantic	3							
1528	Atlantic	3							
1529	Atlantic	3							
1530	Atlantic	4							
1533	Atlantic	2							
1537	Atlantic	2							
1537	Eastern Pacific	1							
1541	Atlantic	1							
1545	Atlantic	3							
1546	Atlantic	1							
1549	Atlantic	1							
1550	Atlantic	1							
1551	Atlantic	3							
1552	Atlantic	3							
1553	Atlantic	3							
1554	Atlantic	7							
1555	Atlantic	1							
1557	Atlantic	1							
1559	Atlantic	1							
1561	Atlantic	1							
1563	Atlantic	2							
1564	Atlantic	1							
1565	Atlantic	2							
1566	Atlantic	2							
1566	Western Pacific	2							
1567	Atlantic	1							
1568	Atlantic	3							
1568	Western Pacific	1	1	1					
1568	South Pacific	1							
1569	Atlantic	1							
1570	Atlantic	1							
1571	Atlantic	3							
1573	Atlantic	1							
1573	Eastern Pacific	1							
1574	Atlantic	1				5			
1575	Atlantic	1							
1576	Atlantic	1							
1577	Atlantic	1							
1578	Atlantic	2							
1579	Atlantic	5							
1583	Atlantic	2							
1586	Atlantic	2							
1587	Atlantic	2							
1588	Atlantic	2							
1589	Atlantic	3							
1589	Western Pacific	1	1	1					
1590	Atlantic	1							
1590	South Pacific	1				1,000			
1591	Atlantic	1							
1593	Atlantic	1							
1594	Atlantic	3							
1595	Atlantic	1							
1596	Western Pacific	3	3	3		6			
1597	Atlantic	1							
1598	Western Pacific	1	1	1					
1599	Atlantic	2							
1599	Western Pacific	1	1	1					
1600	Atlantic	2	2	2		163			
1601	Atlantic	1				1,000			
1601	Western Pacific	1	1	1					
1602	Western Pacific	1	1	1					
1603	Atlantic	1							
1603	Western Pacific	1	1	1					
1605	Atlantic	4				1,300			
1606	Western Pacific	1	1	1					
1608	Atlantic	1							
1608	Western Pacific	2	2	2					
1609	Atlantic	2				32			
1609	Eastern Pacific	1							
1614	Atlantic	1							
1615	Atlantic	2							
1616	Atlantic	1							
1617	Western Pacific	1	1	1					
1620	Western Pacific	1							
1621	Western Pacific	1	1	1					
1622	Atlantic	5				1,090			
1623	Atlantic	3				400			
1625	Atlantic	1							
1626	Atlantic	1				26			
1628	Atlantic	1							
1629	Western Pacific	2	2	2					
1630	Western Pacific	1	1	1					
1631	Atlantic	1				300			
1634	Atlantic	1				40			
1635	Atlantic	1				46			
1638	Atlantic	5							
1638	Western Pacific	2	2	2					
1639	Western Pacific	2	2	2		750			
1640	Atlantic	1							
1641	Atlantic	1							
1642	Atlantic	1							
1643	Atlantic	2							
1643	South Pacific	1							
1644	Atlantic	1				1,100			
1646	Atlantic	1							
1649	Atlantic	1							
1649	Western Pacific	2	2	2		200			
1650	Atlantic	1							
1652	Atlantic	1							
1653	Atlantic	1							
1654	Western Pacific	1	1	1					
1656	Atlantic	1							
1657	Atlantic	1							
1659	Western Pacific	3	3	3					
1661	Atlantic	1							
1664	Atlantic	2							
1665	Atlantic	1							
1666	Atlantic	2				2,000			
1667	Atlantic	1							
1669	Atlantic	2				182			
1670	Atlantic	1							
1671	Atlantic	1							
1671	Western Pacific	1	1	1					
1672	Atlantic	1							
1673	Atlantic	2				200			
1674	Atlantic	2				200			
1675	Atlantic	3				200			
1678	Atlantic	2							
1680	Atlantic	2							
1681	Atlantic	3							
1681	Western Pacific	1	1	1					
1683	Atlantic	1				496			
1686	Atlantic	1							
1686	Western Pacific	1	1	1					
1687	Western Pacific	1	1	1					
1689	Atlantic	2							
1692	Atlantic	3				100			
1693	Atlantic	1							
1693	Western Pacific	1	1	1		14			
1694	Atlantic	1				1,000			
1694	Western Pacific	1	1	1		400			
1695	Atlantic	2				600			
1696	Atlantic	2							
1697	Western Pacific	1	1	1					
1698	Atlantic	1							
1700	Atlantic	2	1	1		98			
1702	Atlantic	1							
1703	Atlantic	2							
1704	Western Pacific	1	1	1					
1705	Atlantic	1							
1706	Atlantic	2	1	1					
1707	Atlantic	2							
1707	Western Pacific	1	1	1					
1708	Atlantic	1				578			
1708	Western Pacific	1	1	1					
1709	Western Pacific	4	4	4					
1711	Western Pacific	1	1	1					
1712	Atlantic	1							
1713	Atlantic	3	3	3		100			
1714	Atlantic	4							
1715	Atlantic	2	1	1		1,000			
1716	Atlantic	1	1	1					
1717	Atlantic	1							
1717	Western Pacific	1	1	1					
1718	Atlantic	1							
1720	Atlantic	1				500			
1720	Western Pacific	1	1	1					
1722	Atlantic	2	2	2		680			
1724	Atlantic	3	2	2		121			
1725	Atlantic	1							
1726	Atlantic	1				18			
1726	Western Pacific	1	1	1					
1727	Atlantic	1	1	1					
1728	Atlantic	2	1	1					
1729	Atlantic	2	1	1					
1730	Atlantic	3	3	3					
1731	Atlantic	2	1	1		1			
1733	Atlantic	1	1	1					
1733	Western Pacific	1	1	1					
1734	Atlantic	1							
1734	Western Pacific	1	1	1					
1737	Atlantic	1							
1738	Atlantic	2	2	2					
1738	Western Pacific	1	1	1					
1740	Atlantic	4	4	4					
1742	Atlantic	1	1	1					
1742	Western Pacific	4	4	4					
1743	Atlantic	1							
1744	Atlantic	1				182			
1745	Atlantic	1							
1746	Atlantic	1							
1747	Atlantic	5				50			
1748	Atlantic	2							
1749	Atlantic	1							
1750	Atlantic	1							
1751	Atlantic	2							
1752	Atlantic	5				7			
1752	Western Pacific	1	1	1					
1753	Western Pacific	2	2	2					
1754	Western Pacific	1	1	1					
1755	Atlantic								
1756	Atlantic	2							
1757	Atlantic	1							
1757	Western Pacific	1	1	1					
1758	Atlantic	3				240			
1759	Atlantic	1							
1760	Atlantic	3				50			
1761	Atlantic	2							
1762	Western Pacific	1	1	1					
1765	Atlantic	2							
1765	South Pacific	1				16			
1766	Atlantic	10	4	4		440			
1766	Western Pacific	1	1	1		48			
1767	Atlantic	3	2	2		1,600			
1767	Western Pacific	1	1	1		500			
1768	Atlantic	2	1	1		1,000			
1768	Western Pacific	1	1	1		1			
1769	Atlantic	3	2	2		6			
1769	Western Pacific	1	1	1					
1770	Atlantic	2	1						
1771	Atlantic	2							
1772	Atlantic	4	3	3		280			
1772	Western Pacific	1	1	1					
1773	Atlantic	3							
1774	Atlantic	3							
1775	Atlantic	4	2	2		4,174			
1776	Atlantic	5	1	1		6,000			
1777	Atlantic	4							
1778	Atlantic	5	5	2		50			
1779	Atlantic	4	4	1		120			
1779	Western Pacific	1	1	1					
1780	Atlantic	8	8	6		31,000			Included the deadliest Atlantic hurricane on record
1780	Western Pacific	3	3	3		100,000			
1781	Atlantic	3				2,000			
1782	Atlantic	2	1	1		3,000			
1782	Western Pacific	1	1	1					
1783	Atlantic	3	3	1					
1783	Western Pacific	1	1	1					
1783	South Pacific	1							
1784	Atlantic	3	3	1		9			
1785	Atlantic	4	4	2		323			
1785	South Pacific	1							
1786	Atlantic	3				7			
1787	Atlantic	4	4	2		223			
1788	Atlantic	3	3	3		600			
1788	South Pacific	1							
1789	Atlantic	1							
1789	South Pacific	1							
1791	Atlantic	3	3	1		3,000			
1792	Atlantic	2	2	2					
1792	Western Pacific	1	1	1					
1793	Atlantic	2	2	2		28			
1793	Western Pacific	3	3	3		4			
1794	Atlantic	8	8	2		100			
1795	Atlantic	3	3	2					
1795	Western Pacific	1	1	1					
1796	Atlantic	3	3	2					
1797	Atlantic	2	2	1					
1797	Western Pacific	1	1	1					
1799	Atlantic	2	2	1		27			

=== 1800s ===
Year	Basin	Number of tropical cyclones	Number of named storms (Note: Tropical cyclones have been named throughout most of the world since the 1960s, and worldwide since 2004.)	≥64 knots (Note: Tropical cyclones with maximum sustained winds of at 64 knots (74 mph, 119 km/h) has been considered a "hurricane" on the Beaufort scale since it was designed by Admiral Sir Francis Beaufort by 1806, and is now classified a Category 1 on the Saffir–Simpson scale in the Atlantic and East Pacific Ocean, a typhoon in the West Pacific Ocean, a very severe cyclonic storm in the North Indian Ocean, a tropical cyclone in the South-West Indian Ocean, and a Category 3 on the Australian tropical cyclone intensity scale used for storms near Australia and in the South Pacific Ocean.) (74 mph, 119 km/h) sustained winds	Strongest storm	Deaths	Damage US$	Retired names	Notes
1800	Atlantic	6	6	6		3			
1801	Atlantic	2	2	2					
1801	Western Pacific	1	1	1					
1802	Atlantic	1	1	1					
1802	Western Pacific	1	1	1					
1803	Atlantic	4	4	4		122			
1803	Western Pacific	2	2	2					
1804	Atlantic	5	5	4		516	$1.7 million		
1804	Western Pacific	1	1	1					
1805	Atlantic	2	2	2					
1806	Atlantic	8	8	5		646	$171,000		
1807	Atlantic	4	4	2					
1808	Atlantic	2	2						
1809	Atlantic	2	2			62			
1809	Western Pacific	1	1	1					
1810	Atlantic	5	5	2					
1810	Western Pacific	1	1	1					
1811	Atlantic	4	4	4		35			
1812	Atlantic	6	6	3		100	$6 million		
1812	Western Pacific	1	1	1					
1813	Atlantic	6	6	6		3,068			
1814	Atlantic	3	3	3					
1815	Atlantic	8	8	5		167			
1816	Atlantic	6	6	5					
1817	Atlantic	2	2	2		25			
1818	Atlantic	5	5	5					
1819	Atlantic	5	5	4		43			
1819	Western Pacific	1	1	1					
1819	South Pacific	1							
1820	Atlantic	2	2	2					
1820	Western Pacific	1	1	1					
1820	South Pacific	1							
1821	Atlantic	3	3	2		57			
1821	Western Pacific	1	1	1					
1821	South Pacific	1							
1822	Atlantic	5	5	5					
1822	Western Pacific	1	1	1					
1823	Atlantic	3	3	2					
1824	Atlantic	2	2	1		100			
1824	Western Pacific	1	1	1					
1825	Atlantic	5	5	4		1,305			
1825	South Pacific	1							
1826	Atlantic	3	3	1		533			
1826	Western Pacific	2	2	2		30			
1827	Atlantic	5	5	3					
1827	Western Pacific	1	1	1					
1827	South Pacific	1							
1828	Atlantic	1	1	1					
1828	Western Pacific	1	1	1		14,429			
1829	Atlantic	4	4	2					
1829	Western Pacific	3	3	3					
1830	Atlantic	5	5	4					
1830	Western Pacific	1	1	1					
1830	South Pacific	2							
1831	Atlantic	5	5	3		2,500			
1831	Western Pacific	2	2	2		150			
1831	South Pacific	2							
1832	Atlantic	5	5	3		52			
1832	Western Pacific	2	2	2					
1832	Eastern Pacific	1							
1833	Atlantic	3	3	3					
1833	Western Pacific	2	2	2					
1833	South Pacific	2							
1834	Atlantic	4	4	4		400			
1834	South Pacific	1							
1835	Atlantic	3	3	3		21			
1835	Western Pacific	2	2	2					
1835	Western Pacific	2	1	1					
1835	South Pacific	1							
1836	Atlantic	3	3	3					
1836	South Pacific	1							
1837	Atlantic	11	11	5		105			
1838	Atlantic	2	2	2		38			
1838	Western Pacific	1	1	1					
1839	Atlantic	4	4	4					
1839	Eastern Pacific	1							
1839	Western Pacific	3	3	3					
1839	South Pacific	5							
1840	Atlantic	3	3	1					
1840	Eastern Pacific	1							
1840	South Pacific	6							
1841	Atlantic	5	5	4		81			
1841	Western Pacific	4	1	1					
1842	Atlantic	9	9	5	Florida	12	$551,000		
1842	Eastern Pacific	1							
1842	Western Pacific	1	1	1					
1842	South Pacific	3							
1843	Atlantic	3	3	2		14			
1843	Eastern Pacific	1							
1843	Western Pacific	1	1	1					
1843	South Pacific	1							
1844	Atlantic	5	5	3		171			
1844	Western Pacific	4	3	3		32			
1844	South Pacific	1							
1845	Atlantic	1	1	1					
1845	Western Pacific	2	1	1		12			
1845	South Pacific	1							
1846	Atlantic	4	4	2	Cuba	229	$338,000		
1846	Western Pacific	2	1	1					
1846	South Pacific								
1847	Atlantic	2	2	1		27			
1847	Eastern Pacific	1							
1847	South Pacific	3							
1848	Atlantic	7	7	4	New England		$20,000		
1848	Western Pacific	3	3	3					
1848	South Pacific	7							
1849	Atlantic	3	3	2		143			
1849	Eastern Pacific	1							
1849	South Pacific	3							
1850	Atlantic	7	7	7		20	$7.1 million		
1850	Eastern Pacific	8							
1850	Western Pacific	1	1	1					
1850	South Pacific	3	3			3			
1851	Atlantic	6	6	3	Florida	24	$60,000		
1851	Eastern Pacific	3							
1851	Western Pacific	1	1	1					
1852	Atlantic	5	5	1	Mississippi	100	$1 million		
1852	Eastern Pacific	1							
1852	Western Pacific	2	1	1					
1852	South Pacific	2	2						
1853	Atlantic	8	8	4	Unnamed	40			
1853	Western Pacific	2	2	2					
1854	Atlantic	5	5	3	South Carolina	30	$20,000		
1854	Eastern Pacific	2							
1854	Western Pacific	1							
1854	South Pacific	3	3						
1855	Atlantic	5	5	4	Louisiana				
1855	Eastern Pacific	3							
1855	Western Pacific	1	1	1					
1855	South Pacific	1	1						
1856	Atlantic	6	6	4	Last Island	200			
1856	South Pacific	4	4						
1857	Atlantic	4	4	3		424			
1857	Eastern Pacific	2							
1858	Atlantic	6	6	6					
1858	Eastern Pacific	3							
1858	Western Pacific	2	1	1					
1858	South Pacific	1	1						
1859	Atlantic	8	8	7	Cuba				
1859	Eastern Pacific	2							
1859	South Pacific	1	1						
1860	Atlantic	7	7	6	Louisiana	60	$1.25 million		
1860	South Pacific	2	2						
1861	Atlantic	8	8	6		22			
1861	South Pacific	4	4						
1862	Atlantic	6	6	3		3			
1862	Western Pacific	1	1	1		80,000			
1862	South Pacific	1	1						
1863	Atlantic	9	9	5		200			
1863	Western Pacific	4	4	4		49			
1863	South Pacific	2	2						
1864	Atlantic	5	5	3					
1864	Western Pacific	1	1	1					
1864	South Pacific	2	2						
1865	Atlantic	7	7	3		326			
1865	Eastern Pacific	1							
1865	Western Pacific	8	7	7					
1865	South Pacific	1	1						
1866	Atlantic	7	7	6		383			
1866	Western Pacific	5	3	3		9			
1866	South Pacific	3	3						
1867	Atlantic	9	9	7	San Narcisco	811	$1 million		
1867	Western Pacific	5	5	5		1,800			
1867	South Pacific	3	3						
1868	Atlantic	4	4	3		2			
1868	Western Pacific	2	2	2					
1868	South Pacific	3	3						
1869	Atlantic	10	10	7	New England	49	$50,000		
1869	Western Pacific	3	1	1					
1869	South Pacific	9	9						
1870	Atlantic	11	11	10	Unnamed	2,052	$12 million		
1870	Eastern Pacific	2							
1870	Western Pacific	8	6	6					
1870	South Pacific	2	2						
1871	Atlantic	8	8	6	Florida	35			
1871	Eastern Pacific	3							
1871	Western Pacific	7	5	5		11			
1871	South Pacific	2	2						
1872	Atlantic	5	5	4	Unnamed				
1872	Western Pacific	5	3	3					
1872	South Pacific	2	2						
1873	Atlantic	5	5	3	Florida	626	$3.5 million		
1873	Western Pacific	6	4	4		200			
1873	South Pacific	2	2						
1874	Atlantic	7	7	4	Jamaica	1			
1874	Eastern Pacific	1							
1874	Western Pacific	8	6	6		10,000			
1874	South Pacific	7	7						
1875	Atlantic	6	6	5	Indianola	800	$5 million		
1875	Western Pacific	6	4	4		4			
1875	South Pacific	7	7						
1876	Atlantic	5	5	4	Cuba	19			
1876	Eastern Pacific	1*	1*						
1876	Western Pacific	2	2	2		150			
1876	South Pacific	3	3						
1877	Atlantic	8	8	3	Florida	84			
1877	Eastern Pacific	1							
1877	Western Pacific	1							
1877	South Pacific	8	8						
1878	Atlantic	12	12	10	Haiti	108	$2 million		
1878	Western Pacific	3	3	3					
1878	South Pacific	3	3			117			
1879	Atlantic	8	8	6	Louisiana	47	$500,000		
1879	Western Pacific	9	8	8					
1879	South Pacific	4	4						
1880	Atlantic	11	11	9	Unnamed	133			
1880	Eastern Pacific	2							
1880	Western Pacific	3	3	3					
1880	South Pacific	5	5						
1881	Atlantic	7	7	4	Georgia	700			
1881	Eastern Pacific	2							
1881	Western Pacific	22	21	21		23,000			
1881	South Pacific	4	4						
1882	Atlantic	6	6	4	Florida	140			
1882	Eastern Pacific	2							
1882	Western Pacific	12	11	11					
1882	South Pacific	3	3						
1883	Atlantic	4	4	3	Unnamed	236			
1883	Eastern Pacific	2							
1883	Western Pacific	16	15	15					
1883	South Pacific	8	8						
1884	Atlantic	4	4	4	Unnamed	8			
1884	Eastern Pacific	2							
1884	Western Pacific	14							
1884	South Pacific	2	2						
1885	Atlantic	8	8	6	South Carolina	25	$1.81 million		
1885	Eastern Pacific	4							
1885	Western Pacific	9							
1885	South Pacific	2	2						
1886	Atlantic	12	12	10	Indianola	220	$2.25 million		Featured the most United States hurricane landfalls
1886	Eastern Pacific	1							
1886	Western Pacific	15							
1886	South Pacific	4	4						
1887	Atlantic	19	18	11	Unnamed	2			
1887	Eastern Pacific	2							
1887	Western Pacific	21							
1887	South Pacific	1	1						
1888	Atlantic	9	9	6	Louisiana	924	$2.7 million		
1888	Eastern Pacific	4							
1888	Western Pacific	13							
1888	South Pacific	1	1						
1889	Atlantic	9	9	6	Mexico	40			
1889	Eastern Pacific	1							
1889	Western Pacific	12							
1889	South Pacific	5	5			147			
1890	Atlantic	4	4	2	Unnamed	14			
1890	Eastern Pacific	1							
1890	Western Pacific	14							
1890	North Indian	10	4	1		727			
1890	South Pacific	9	9			14			
1891	Atlantic	10	10	7	San Magín	700			
1891	Eastern Pacific	2							
1891	Western Pacific	18							
1891	North Indian	13	4	3					
1891	South Pacific	6	6						
1892	Atlantic	9	9	5		16			
1892	Eastern Pacific	1							
1892	Western Pacific	20							
1892	North Indian	12	7	2					
1892	South Pacific	2	2						
1893	Atlantic	12	12	10	Cheniere Caminada	4,028	$6 million		
1893	Western Pacific	20							
1893	North Indian	12	10	4					
1893	South Pacific	2	2						
1894	Atlantic	7	7	5	Caribbean	200	$1 million		
1894	Western Pacific	14							
1894	North Indian	12	6	0					
1895	Atlantic	6	6	2	Texas	56			
1895	Eastern Pacific	2							
1895	Western Pacific	16							
1895	North Indian	11	5	4					
1895	South Pacific	1	1						
1896	Atlantic	7	7	6	San Ramón	286	$10 million		
1896	Western Pacific	18							
1896	North Indian	10	8	3					
1896	South Pacific	1	1						
1897	Atlantic	6	6	3	Unnamed	262	$150,000		
1897	Western Pacific	13							
1897	North Indian	12	6	6					
1897	South Pacific	1	1						
1898	Atlantic	11	11	5	Georgia	562	$5.4 million		
1898	Western Pacific	19							
1898	North Indian	13	7	3					
1898	South Pacific	2	2						
1899	Atlantic	10	10	5	San Ciriaco	4,167	$21.3 million		Featured the San Ciriaco Hurricane, the longest-lasting storm in the basin
1899	Eastern Pacific	2							
1899	Western Pacific	19	3	3					
1899	North Indian	7	3	0					
1899	South Pacific	1	1						

=== 1900s ===
Year	Basin	Number of tropical cyclones	Number of named storms (Note: Tropical cyclones have been named throughout most of the world since the 1960s, and worldwide since 2004.)	≥64 knots (Note: Tropical cyclones with maximum sustained winds of at 64 knots (74 mph, 119 km/h) has been considered a "hurricane" on the Beaufort scale since it was designed by Admiral Sir Francis Beaufort by 1806, and is now classified a Category 1 on the Saffir–Simpson scale in the Atlantic and East Pacific Ocean, a typhoon in the West Pacific Ocean, a very severe cyclonic storm in the North Indian Ocean, a tropical cyclone in the South-West Indian Ocean, and a Category 3 on the Australian tropical cyclone intensity scale used for storms near Australia and in the South Pacific Ocean.) (74 mph, 119 km/h) sustained winds	Strongest storm	Deaths	Damage US$	Retired names	Notes
1900	Atlantic	7	7	3	Galveston	8,000	$31.5 million		
1900	Eastern Pacific	1	1						
1900	Western Pacific	23	23			1,965			
1900	North Indian	10	3	1					
1900	South Pacific	5							
1901	Atlantic	13	13	6	Louisiana	35	$1 million		
1901	Eastern Pacific	1	1						
1901	Western Pacific	21	21			4			
1901	North Indian	6	3	2					
1901	South Pacific	8							
1902	Atlantic	5*	5*	3	Florida	5			
1902	Eastern Pacific	6	3	3					
1902	Western Pacific	24							
1902	North Indian	13	7	5					
1902	South Pacific	1							
1903	Atlantic	10	10	7	Jamaica	222	$18.5 million		
1903	Eastern Pacific	2	2	2					
1903	Western Pacific	31							
1903	North Indian	14	8	2					
1903	South Pacific	6				517			
1904	Atlantic	6	6	4	South Carolina	112	$2.5 million		
1904	Eastern Pacific	2	2						
1904	Western Pacific	23							
1904	North Indian	9	4	0					
1904	South Pacific	2							
1905	Atlantic	5	5	1	Bahamas	8			
1905	Eastern Pacific	1	1	1					
1905	Western Pacific	24				596			
1905	North Indian	10	6	0					
1905	South Pacific	5				8			
1906	Atlantic	11	11	6	Lesser Antilles	381	$25.4 million		
1906	Eastern Pacific	6	2	2					
1906	Western Pacific	24				15,000	$20 million		
1906	North Indian	11	7	1					
1906	South Pacific	2				150			
1907	Atlantic	5	5	0	Florida				
1907	Eastern Pacific	2	2	2					
1907	Western Pacific	32				473			
1907	North Indian	15	8	4					
1907	South Pacific	3							
1908	Atlantic	10	10	6	Bahamas	19			
1908	Western Pacific	31				428			
1908	North Indian	9	6	1					
1908	South Pacific	3				2			
1909	Atlantic	12	12	6	Louisiana	4,673	$77.3 million		
1909	Western Pacific	35							
1909	North Indian	8	8	4					
1909	South Pacific	2							
1910	Atlantic	5	5	3	Cuba	100	$1.25 million		
1910	Eastern Pacific	3	3						
1910	Western Pacific	38							
1910	North Indian	6	5	2					
1910	South Pacific	2							
1911	Atlantic	6	6	3	Georgia	27	$3 million		
1911	Eastern Pacific	11*	2	2		500			
1911	Western Pacific	30							
1911	North Indian	7	5	4					
1911	South Pacific	5							
1912	Atlantic	7	7	4	Jamaica	122	$1.6 million		
1912	Eastern Pacific	4	1	1					
1912	Western Pacific	27				51,002	$20 million		
1912	North Indian	9	6	2					
1912	South Pacific	1							
1913	Atlantic	6	6	4	North Carolina	6	$4 million		
1913	Eastern Pacific	1							
1913	Western Pacific	23							
1913	North Indian	10	6	2					
1913	South Pacific	6							
1914	Atlantic	1	1	0	Georgia				The quietest Atlantic hurricane season on record
1914	Western Pacific	25							
1914	North Indian	8	4	2					
1914	South Pacific	5							
1915	Atlantic	6	6	5	Louisiana	675	$63 million		
1915	Eastern Pacific	4	1	1					
1915	Western Pacific	23							
1915	North Indian	9	6	0					
1915	South Pacific	7							
1916	Atlantic	15	15	10	Texas	107	$33.3 million		
1916	Western Pacific	23							
1916	North Indian	14	8	5					
1916	South Pacific	5							
1917	Atlantic	4	4	2	Cuba	76	$170,000		
1917	Eastern Pacific	4	1	1					
1917	Western Pacific	16				4,000	$50 million		
1917	North Indian	9	6	0					
1917	South Pacific	6							
1918	Atlantic	6	6	4	Louisiana	55	$5 million		
1918	Eastern Pacific	3	2	2		25			
1918	Western Pacific	16				129			
1918	North Indian	11	5	0					
1918	South Pacific	6							
1919	Atlantic	5	5	2	Florida Keys	828	$22 million		
1919	Eastern Pacific	2							
1919	Western Pacific	26							
1919	North Indian	11	6	3					
1919	South Pacific	14							
1920	Atlantic	5	5	4	Unnamed	3	$1.45 million		
1920	Eastern Pacific	3							
1920	Western Pacific	20							
1920	North Indian	9	5	0					
1920	South Pacific	8							
1921	Atlantic	7	7	5	Tampa Bay	306	$3 million		
1921	Eastern Pacific	9							
1921	Western Pacific	24							
1921	North Indian	10	4	1					
1921	South Pacific	8							
1922	Atlantic	5	5	3	Bermuda	105	$2.25 million		
1922	Eastern Pacific	7							
1922	Western Pacific	24				100,000			
1922	North Indian	13	6	6					
1922	South Pacific	6							
1923	Atlantic	9*	9	4	Bahamas				
1923	Eastern Pacific	5	1	1					
1923	Western Pacific	26				3,100	$10 million		
1923	North Indian	16	4	3					
1923	South Pacific	20							
1924	Atlantic	11	11	5	Cuba	150			
1924	Eastern Pacific	3							
1924	Western Pacific	25							
1924	North Indian	13	6	0					
1924	South Pacific	3							
1925	Atlantic	4	4	1	Unnamed	59	$1.6 million		
1925	Eastern Pacific	9	4	4		3			
1925	Western Pacific	22							
1925	North Indian	20	7	3					
1925	South Pacific	5							
1926	Atlantic	11	11	8	Miami	1,554	$267 million		
1926	Eastern Pacific	8	1	1					
1926	Western Pacific	19							
1926	North Indian	13	10	3					
1926	South Pacific	10							
1927	Atlantic	8	8	4	Nova Scotia	173	$1.7 million		
1927	Eastern Pacific	11							
1927	Western Pacific	27	19	19		20,952	$4 million		
1927	North Indian	18	7	2					
1927	South Pacific	9							
1928	Atlantic	6	6	4	Okeechobee	4,289	$102 million		
1928	Eastern Pacific	9	4						
1928	Western Pacific	22							
1928	North Indian	13	7	0					
1928	South Pacific	7							
1929	Atlantic	5	5	3	Bahamas	62	$3 million		
1929	Eastern Pacific	8	3						
1929	Western Pacific	22							
1929	North Indian	15	6	0					
1929	South Pacific	13							
1930	Atlantic	3	3	2	Dominican Republic	2,000	$50 million		
1930	Eastern Pacific	5	4	4					
1930	Western Pacific	25							
1930	North Indian	14	10	1					
1930	South Pacific	10							
1931	Atlantic	13	13	3	Belize	2,502	$7.5 million		
1931	Eastern Pacific	10				100			
1931	Western Pacific	30	19	19		300,349			
1931	North Indian	11	5	1					
1931	South Pacific	3				200			
1932	Atlantic	15	15	6	Cuba	3,385	$77.7 million		
1932	Eastern Pacific	5	4	4		15	$5 million		
1932	Western Pacific	27				147			
1932	North Indian	14	6	2					
1932	South Pacific	1							
1933	Atlantic	20	20	11	Tampico	651	$86.6 million		Fourth most active season on record
1933	Eastern Pacific	3	2	1					
1933	Western Pacific	29							
1933	North Indian	16	8	3					
1933	South Pacific	9							
1934	Atlantic	13	13	7	Unnamed	2,017	$4.26 million		
1934	Eastern Pacific	2	2	2					
1934	Western Pacific	29				3,155	$300 million		
1934	North Indian	16	5	0					
1934	South Pacific	4							
1935	Atlantic	8	8	5	Labor Day	2,679	$126 million		Included the strongest recorded storm to hit the United States
1935	Eastern Pacific	3	2						
1935	Western Pacific	24							
1935	North Indian	15	6	2					
1935	South Pacific	7							
1936	Atlantic	11	11	4	Mid-Atlantic	5	$1.23 million		
1936	Eastern Pacific	5	5	4					
1936	Western Pacific	33		19		2,341			
1936	North Indian	17	6	3		293			
1936	South Pacific	14							
1937	Atlantic	17	17	7	Unnamed				
1937	Eastern Pacific	4	1	1					
1937	Western Pacific	25		18		11,525			
1937	North Indian	19	6	2					
1937	South Pacific	11				6			
1938	Atlantic	9	9	4	New England	701	$306 million		
1938	Eastern Pacific	16	1						
1938	Western Pacific	31				338			
1938	North Indian	10	4	4					
1938	South Pacific	7							
1939	Atlantic	6	6	3	Unnamed	5			
1939	Eastern Pacific	10	10	4		93	$2 million		
1939	Western Pacific	28	24	22		151			
1939	North Indian	19	7	3					
1939	South Pacific	10							
1940	Atlantic	9	9	6	Unnamed	71	$29.3 million		
1940	Eastern Pacific	10*	10	2					
1940	Western Pacific	43	27	27	Unnamed	183			
1940	North Indian	16	8	5					
1940	South Pacific	5							
1941	Atlantic	6	6	4	Texas	63	$10 million		
1941	Eastern Pacific	9	9	3					
1941	Western Pacific	28							
1941	North Indian	19	8	4					
1941	South Pacific	9							
1942	Atlantic	11	11	4	Texas	17	$30.6 million		
1942	Western Pacific	30							
1942	North Indian	14	5	2		40,000			
1942	South Pacific	4							
1943	Atlantic	10	10	5	Unnamed	20	$17.7 million		
1943	Eastern Pacific					106	$4.5 million		
1943	Western Pacific	34							
1943	North Indian	14	7	1					
1943	South Pacific	5							
1944	Atlantic	14	14	8	Mid-Atlantic	1,156	$202 million		
1944	Western Pacific	26				3,798			
1944	North Indian	19	8	2					
1944	South Pacific	6							
1945	Atlantic	11	11	5	Florida	36	$82.7 million		
1945	Western Pacific	26	26	13	Jean	3,798			
1945	North Indian	15	3	2					
1945	South Pacific	2							
1946	Atlantic	7	7	3	Bahamas	5	$5.2 million		
1946	Western Pacific	19	19	18	Lilly				
1946	North Indian	17	5	1		750			
1946	South Pacific	8							
1947	Atlantic	10	10	5	Fort Lauderdale	112	$184 million		
1947	Western Pacific	27	27	19	Rosalind				
1947	North Indian	18	4	2					
1947	South Pacific	11							
1948	Atlantic	10	10	6		112	$28.8 million		
1948	Western Pacific	26	16	15	Libby				
1948	North Indian	18	6	3					
1948	South Pacific	11							
1949	Atlantic	16	16	7	Florida	26	$59.8 million		
1949	Eastern Pacific	7	7	2					
1949	Western Pacific	34	22	14	Allyn	1,790	$127 million		
1949	North Indian	12	1	1					
1949	South Pacific	9							
1950	Atlantic	16	16	11	Dog	93	$43.4 million		First season in which storms were named
1950	Eastern Pacific	7	7	6		1	$200,000		
1950	Western Pacific	18	18	12	Clara	544			
1950	North Indian	16	4						
1950	South Pacific	6					5		
1951	Atlantic	12	12	8	Easy	276	$80 million		
1951	Eastern Pacific	9	9	2					
1951	Western Pacific	31	25	16	Marge	1,185	$106 million		
1951	North Indian	15	4	2					
1951	South Pacific	3							
1952	Atlantic	11	11	5	Fox	607	$13.8 million		
1952	Eastern Pacific	7	7	3					
1952	Western Pacific	29	29	20	Wilma	1,070			
1952	North Indian	17	4	2					
1952	South Pacific	6							
1953	Atlantic	14	14	7	Carol	14	$3.75 million		
1953	Eastern Pacific	4	4	2					Least active season on record
1953	Western Pacific	24	24	17	Nina	430			
1953	North Indian	10	1	1					
1953	South Pacific	3							
1954	Atlantic	16	16	7	Hazel	1,069	$752 million	Carol, Edna, Hazel	
1954	Eastern Pacific	11	11	3		40			
1954	Western Pacific	33	19	15	Ida	1,530			
1954	North Indian	14	1						
1954	South Pacific	7							
1955	Atlantic	13	13	9	Janet	1,601	$1.1 billion	Connie, Diane, Ione, Janet	
1955	Eastern Pacific	6	6	2	Unnamed				
1955	Western Pacific	39	31	20					
1955	North Indian	13	6	2					
1955	South Pacific	9							
1956	Atlantic	12	12	4	Betsy	76	$67.8 million		
1956	Eastern Pacific	11	11	7	Unnamed				
1956	Western Pacific	39	26	18	Wanda	5,980	$60.5 million		
1956	North Indian	14	4	2					
1956	South Pacific	13							
1957	Atlantic	8	8	3	Carrie	513	$153 million	Audrey	
1957	Eastern Pacific	13	13	9	Unnamed	21	$100,000		
1957	Western Pacific	27	22	18	Lola	644			
1957	North Indian	7	4	2		20			
1957	South Pacific	10							
1958	Atlantic	12	12	7	Helene	52	$11.7 million		
1958	Eastern Pacific	14	14	5	Unnamed				
1958	Western Pacific	24	23	21	Ida	1,269	$50 million		
1958	North Indian	12	5	2					
1958	South Pacific	9							
1959	Atlantic	14	14	7	Gracie	64	$24 million		
1959	Eastern Pacific	15	15	5	Patsy	1,800	$280 million		Included the deadliest Pacific hurricane on record
1959	Western Pacific	33	25	18	Joan	8,557	$755 million		
1959	North Indian	16	6	3		141			
1959	South Pacific	10							
1960	Atlantic	8	8	4	Donna	492	$991 million	Donna	
1960	Eastern Pacific	8	8	5	Estelle				
1960	Western Pacific	39	30	19	Shirley	2,869	$69 million	Lucille, Ophelia	
1960	North Indian	15	5	2	Bangladesh	20,341	$9.24 million		
1960	South-West Indian (Jan.–July/Aug.–Dec.)	8	6	3	Carol	50	$95 million		
1960	South Pacific	6							
1961	Atlantic	12	12	8	Carla	348	$392 million	Carla, Hattie	
1961	Eastern Pacific	10	9	2	Iva	436	$16 million		
1961	Western Pacific	53	35	20	Nancy	308			
1961	North Indian	18	5	2	Winnie	11,525			
1961	South-West Indian (Jan.–July/Aug.–Dec.)	7	5	2	Doris				
1961	South Pacific	7							
1962	Atlantic	7	7	4	Ella	29	$3.9 million		
1962	Eastern Pacific	18	16	2	Doreen		$11 million		
1962	Western Pacific	38	30	23	Emma	1,700	$325 million	Karen	
1962	North Indian	13	5	1	Unnamed				
1962	South-West Indian (Jan.–July/Aug.–Dec.)	14	11	5	Bertha	51			
1962	South Pacific	7							
1963	Atlantic	10	10	7	Flora	7,225	$830 million	Flora	
1963	Eastern Pacific	8	8	4	Mona				
1963	Western Pacific	36	25	19	Judy				
1963	North Indian	17	6	4	East Pakistan	11,735			
1963	South-West Indian (Jan.–July/Aug.–Dec.)	9	9	4	Grace				
1963	South Pacific	10							
1964	Atlantic	13	13	7	Hilda	270	$610 million	Cleo, Dora, Hilda	
1964	Eastern Pacific	6	5	1	Odessa				
1964	Western Pacific	58	39	26	Sally & Opal	8,743			Most active tropical cyclone season ever
1964	North Indian	16	7	3	Rameswaram	2,977	$150 million		
1964	South-West Indian (Jan.–July/Aug.–Dec.)	15*	12*	3	Giselle				
1964	South Pacific	9				250			
1965	Atlantic	10	10	4	Betsy	81	$1.45 billion	Betsy	Featured Betsy, the first billion-dollar Atlantic hurricane
1965	Eastern Pacific	11	10	1	Emily	6		Hazel	
1965	Western Pacific	44	35	21	Bess				
1965	North Indian	14	6	4		47,000			
1965	South-West Indian (Jan.–July/Aug.–Dec.)	15	8	1	Freda				
1965	South Pacific	4							
1966	Atlantic	17	15	7	Inez	1,096	$437 million	Inez	
1966	Eastern Pacific	18	13	8	Connie				
1966	Western Pacific	51	30	20	Kit	997	$378 million		
1966	North Indian	18	8	6		50			
1966	South-West Indian (Jan.–July/Aug.–Dec.)	20*	11*	3*	Ivy	3			
1966	South Pacific	8							
1967	Atlantic	20	15	6	Beulah	79	$235 million	Beulah	
1967	Eastern Pacific	17	17	6	Olivia	121			
1967	Western Pacific	40	35	20	Carla	494			
1967	North Indian	15	6	4					
1967	South-West Indian (Jan.–July/Aug.–Dec.)	11*	6*	4					
1967	South Pacific	8							
1968	Atlantic	13	9	4	Gladys	17	$21.9 million		
1968	Eastern Pacific	26*	20*	6	Rebecca	9			
1968	Western Pacific	39	29	20	Agnes	148			
1968	North Indian	13	7	4		1,037			
1968	South-West Indian (Jan.–July/Aug.–Dec.)	11*	10*	4		38			
1968	Australia (Jan.–July/Aug.–Dec.)	14*	8	3	Gina				
1968	South Pacific	9							
1968	Worldwide	117			Agnes	1,49	$21.9 million		
1969	Atlantic	23	18	12	Camille	535	$1.5 billion	Camille	Featured Camille, the second Category 5 storm to make landfall in the contiguous United States
1969	Eastern Pacific	15	10	4	Doreen	10			
1969	Western Pacific	34	23	13	Elsie	1,177			
1969	North Indian	14	6	1		858			
1969	South-West Indian (Jan.–July/Aug.–Dec.)	10	9	5		108			
1969	Australia (Jan.–July/Aug.–Dec.)	10*	6*						
1969	South Pacific	7							
1969	Worldwide	110			Camille	2,688	$1.5 billion		
1970	Atlantic	20	14	7	Celia	111	$1.03 billion	Celia	
1970	Eastern Pacific	21	19	5	Lorraine	22		Adele	
1970	Western Pacific	30	24	12	Hope	3,909			
1970	North Indian Ocean	15	7	3	Bhola	500,805	$86.4 million		Included the deadliest tropical cyclone on record
1970	South-West Indian (Jan.–July/Aug.–Dec.)	13*	11*	8	Jane	4			
1970	Australia (Jan.–July/Aug.–Dec.)	18	17	8	Kathy	14	$12 million	Ada	
1970	South Pacific (Jan.–July/Aug.–Dec.)	9	7	2	Emma				
1970	Worldwide	119	91	39	Hope	504,865	$1.13 billion	3	
1971	Atlantic	22	13	6	Edith	52	$220 million		
1971	Eastern Pacific	22*	18*	12*	Olivia	31	$40 million		
1971	Western Pacific	55	35	24	Irma	617	$57.7 million		
1971	North Indian Ocean	15	7	6		10,800			
1971	South-West Indian (Jan.–July/Aug.–Dec.)	12	11	7	Maggie-Muriel	32			
1971	Australia (Jan.–July/Aug.–Dec.)	18	18	9	Sheila-Sophie	3	$120 million	Althea	
1971	South Pacific (Jan.–July/Aug.–Dec.)	8	8	1	Ursula			Rosie, Vivienne	
1971	Worldwide	144	100	65	Irma	11,535	$438 million	3	
1972	Atlantic	19	7	3	Betty	134	$2.1 billion	Agnes	
1972	Eastern Pacific	20	14	9	Celeste	1	$3.5 million		
1972	Western Pacific	38*	30*	22*	Rita	860	$290 million		
1972	North Indian Ocean	18*	7	6		180			
1972	South-West Indian (Jan.–July/Aug.–Dec.)	9*	7*	2	Fabienne	7			
1972	Australia (Jan.–July/Aug.–Dec.)	15	15	8	Emily	8	$70 million	Emily	
1972	South Pacific (Jan.–July/Aug.–Dec.)	10	10	8	Gail	24	$20 million	Carlotta, Wendy, Bebe	
1972	Worldwide	120	90	53	Rita	1,214	$4.18 billion	5	
1973	Atlantic	24	8	4	Ellen	22	$28 million		
1973	Eastern Pacific	18	12	7	Ava				
1973	Western Pacific	25	21	12	Nora	971	$2 million		
1973	North Indian	12	7	3					
1973	South-West Indian (Jan.–July/Aug.–Dec.)	16*	13*	5	Lydie	11			
1973	Australia (Jan.–July/Aug.–Dec.)	22	22	13	Flores	1,735		Madge	Included the deadliest tropical cyclone in the southern hemisphere
1973	South Pacific (Jan.–July/Aug.–Dec.)	7	7	1	Lottie	85		Lottie	
1973	Worldwide	118	85	41	Nora	2,824	$30 million	2	
1974	Atlantic	20	11	4	Carmen	8,227	$2 billion	Carmen, Fifi	Featured Fifi, the third deadliest Atlantic hurricane
1974	Eastern Pacific	25*	18*	11*	Maggie	18	$4 million		
1974	Western Pacific	35	32	16	Gloria	361	$1.53 billion	Bess	
1974	North Indian	12	7	3					
1974	South-West Indian (Jan.–July/Aug.–Dec.)	4	3	0	Ghislaine				
1974	Australia (Jan.–July/Aug.–Dec.)	16	16	6	Pam	87	$645 million	Wanda, Tracy	Featured Tracy, the smallest tropical cyclone to reach major category strength
1974	South Pacific (Jan.–July/Aug.–Dec.)	13	12	1	Pam			Tina	
1974	Worldwide	118	93	40	Carmen, Maggie, & Pam	8,693	$4.18 billion	6	
1975	Atlantic	23	9	6	Gladys	87	$5.65 billion	Eloise	
1975	Eastern Pacific	21	17	9	Denise	30	$20 million		
1975	Western Pacific	25	20	14	June	229,160	$1.2 billion		Includes the deadliest Pacific typhoon and 4th deadliest tropical cyclone on record Typhoon Nina
1975	North Indian	20	8	3	Unnamed				
1975	South-West Indian (Jan.–July/Aug.–Dec.)	11*	7*	3*	Gervaise	10			
1975	Australia (Jan.–July/Aug.–Dec.)	15	15	5	Trixie & Joan		$31 million	Trixie, Joan	
1975	South Pacific (Jan.–July/Aug.–Dec.)	9*	8*	3	Val & Alison			Alison	
1975	Worldwide	121	81	42	June	229,287	$6.9 billion	4	
1976	Atlantic	21	10	6	Belle	84	$5.65 billion		
1976	Eastern Pacific	19	15	9	Annette	1,263	$360 million		
1976	Western Pacific	30	25	14	Louise	650	$1.16 billion		
1976	North Indian	7	7	6	Unnamed	10			
1976	South-West Indian (Jan.–July/Aug.–Dec.)	8	6	1	Danae	50			
1976	Australia (Jan.–July/Aug.–Dec.)	14*	14*	7	Ted			Beth, Ted	
1976	South Pacific (Jan.–July/Aug.–Dec.)	8*	7*	3	David			David	
1976	Worldwide	104	81	44	Louise	2,061	$7.17 billion	3	
1977	Atlantic	16	6	5	Anita	11	$13 million	Anita	
1977	Eastern Pacific	17*	8	4	Florence	8	$39.6 million		
1977	Western Pacific	26	20	11	Babe	190			
1977	North Indian	6	6	2	Andhra Pradesh	10,946	$197 million		
1977	South-West Indian (Jan.–July/Aug.–Dec.)	12*	10*	4	Aurore	1			
1977	Australia (Jan.–July/Aug.–Dec.)	13	13	5	Leo				
1977	South Pacific (Jan.–July/Aug.–Dec.)	11	11	2	Robert			Marion, Robert	
1977	Worldwide	105	70	31	Babe	11,156	$250 million	3	
1978	Atlantic	24	12	5	Greta	41	$135 million	Greta	
1978	Eastern Pacific	23*	19*	14*	Fico, Hector, & Norman	4	$301 million	Fico	
1978	Western Pacific	35	31	16	Rita	368	$100 million		
1978	North Indian	4	2	1	Sri Lanka	1000			
1978	South-West Indian (Jan.–July/Aug.–Dec.)	10*	9*	2	Fleur & Angele	76			
1978	Australia (Jan.–July/Aug.–Dec.)	10	10	5	Alby	7	$59.4 million	Alby	
1978	South Pacific (Jan.–July/Aug.–Dec.)	6	7	3	Bob & Charles			Bob, Charles, Diana, Fay	
1978	Worldwide	110	88	45	Rita	1,496	$595 million	7	
1979	Atlantic	9	9	5	David	2,136	$4.12 billion	David, Frederic	
1979	Eastern Pacific	13	10	6	Ignacio				
1979	Western Pacific	54	24	12	Tip	541	$2.24 billion		Included Tip, the strongest and largest tropical cyclone on record
1979	North Indian	11	5	1	India	700			
1979	South-West Indian (Jan.–July/Aug.–Dec.)	13	8	5	Celine & Idylle	5	$175 million		
1979	Australia (Jan.–July/Aug.–Dec.)	13	13	6	Hazel	15	$42 million		
1979	South Pacific (Jan.–July/Aug.–Dec.)	10	8	2	Meli	50		Gordon, Kerry, Meli	
1979	Worldwide	133	59	36	Tip	3,442	$6.58 billion	5	
1980	Atlantic	15	11	9	Allen	337	$1.57 billion	Allen	Featured Allen, the strongest Atlantic hurricane on record by wind speed
1980	Eastern Pacific	16	15	7	Kay				
1980	Western Pacific	44	24	15	Wynne	493	$195 million		
1980	North Indian	14	3	0	Unnamed				
1980	South-West Indian (Jan.–July/Aug.–Dec.)	10*	8*	6*		25	$167 million		Included Cyclone Hyacinthe, the wettest tropical cyclone on record
1980	Australia (Jan.–July/Aug.–Dec.)	17	16	10	Amy			Simon	
1980	South Pacific (Jan.–July/Aug.–Dec.)	7	7	2	Peni and Sina	22	$2.26 million	Wally	
1980	Worldwide	120	80	46	Wynne	877	$1.93 billion	3	
1981	Atlantic	22	12	7	Harvey	11	$45 million		
1981	Eastern Pacific	17	15	8	Norma	79	$137 million		
1981	Western Pacific	52	29	13	Elsie	1,268	$280 million		
1981	North Indian	12	6		Unnamed	92			
1981	South-West Indian (Jan.–July/Aug.–Dec.)	11	10	4	Florine	13			
1981	Australia (Jan.–July/Aug.–Dec.)	11*	11*	7	Mabel			Cliff	
1981	South Pacific (Jan.–July/Aug.–Dec.)	11	11	5	Gyan	1		Tahmar, Gyan	
1981	Worldwide	135	93	44	Elsie	1,464	$462 million	3	
1982	Atlantic	9	6	2	Debby	29	$100 million		Included one subtropical storm
1982	Eastern Pacific	30	23	12	Olivia	1,937	$1.2 billion	Iwa	Featured Paul, the second deadliest tropical cyclone in the basin
1982	Western Pacific	29	25	19	Mac	523	$2.41 billion	Bess	
1982	North Indian	20	5						
1982	South-West Indian (Jan.–July/Aug.–Dec.)	14	8	3	Damia	87	$250 million		
1982	Australia (Jan.–July/Aug.–Dec.)	13	13	6	Karla			Daphne, Dominic	
1982	South Pacific (Jan.–July/Aug.–Dec.)	8	8	4	Isaac			Isaac, Joti	
1982	Worldwide	120	85	40	Mac	3,070	$3.96 billion	6	
1983	Atlantic	7	4	3	Alicia	22	$3 billion	Alicia	
1983	Eastern Pacific	26	21	12	Kiko, Raymond	168	$303 million		
1983	Western Pacific	33	23	10	Forrest	1,073	$258 million		
1983	North Indian	8	3						
1983	South-West Indian (Jan.–July/Aug.–Dec.)	4	3	2	Andry and Bakoly	75	$69 million		
1983	Australia (Jan.–July/Aug.–Dec.)	14	13	8	Elinor			Elinor, Jane	
1983	South Pacific (Jan.–July/Aug.–Dec.)	12	10	9	Oscar	16	$132 million	Lisa, Mark, Oscar, Veena	
1983	Worldwide	97	79	44	Forrest	1,313	$3.76 billion	7	
1984	Atlantic	20	13	5	Diana	37	$229 million		
1984	Eastern Pacific	26	21	13	Douglas	21			
1984	Western Pacific	44	27	16	Vanessa	2,919	$1.1 billion	Ike	
1984	North Indian	7	3			430			
1984	South-West Indian (Jan.–July/Aug.–Dec.)	11	11	2	Jaminy, and Kamisy	242	$199 million		
1984	Australia (Jan.–July/Aug.–Dec.)	17	17	12	Kathy			Kathy, Lance	
1984	South Pacific (Jan.–July/Aug.–Dec.)	8	8	1	Beti				
1984	Worldwide	125	96	50	Vanessa	3,722	$1.53 billion	3	
1985	Atlantic	14	11	7	Gloria	60	$4.52 billion	Elena, Gloria	Featured the most hurricane landfalls in the United States since 1886
1985	Eastern Pacific	28	24	13	Rick	1	$1 million		
1985	Western Pacific	57	28	15	Dot	1,355	$243 million		
1985	North Indian	15	7			11,107			
1985	South-West Indian (Jan.–July/Aug.–Dec.)	7	7	1	Helisaonina				
1985	Australia (Jan.–July/Aug.–Dec.)	18	15	9	Kirsty			Nigel, Sandy, Margot	
1985	South Pacific (Jan.–July/Aug.–Dec.)	7	7	5	Hina	37	$40 million	Eric	
1985	Worldwide	137	97	51	Dot	12,560	$4.8 billion	6	
1986	Atlantic	10	6	4	Earl	21	$67.5 million		
1986	Eastern Pacific	26	17	9	Roslyn	2	$352 million		
1986	Western Pacific	48	29	19	Peggy	905	$508 million		
1986	North Indian	8	1	0					
1986	South-West Indian (Jan.–July/Aug.–Dec.)	11	11	5	Erinesta	99	$150 million		
1986	Australia (Jan.–July/Aug.–Dec.)	14	14	6	Victor	153	$254 million	Winifred, Manu	
1986	South Pacific (Jan.–July/Aug.–Dec.)	11	11	5	Ima	2	$39 million	Ima, Namu, Raja, Sally	
1986	Worldwide	119	77	46	Peggy	1,193	$1.37 billion	6	
1987	Atlantic	14	7	3	Emily	10	$90 million		
1987	Eastern Pacific	25	20	10	Max	3	$144 million	Knut	
1987	Western Pacific	32	23	17	Betty	1,403	$1.3 billion		
1987	North Indian	9	5						
1987	South-West Indian (Jan.–July/Aug.–Dec.)	11*	7*	1	Daodo	12	$10 million		
1987	Australia (Jan.–July/Aug.–Dec.)	10	8	3	Elsie			Connie, Jason, Elsie	
1987	South Pacific (Jan.–July/Aug.–Dec.)	9	7	4	Uma	50	$230 million	Tusi, Uma	
1987	Worldwide	100	78	36	Betty	1,478	$1.77 billion	6	
1988	Atlantic	19	12	5	Gilbert	550	$4.86 billion	Gilbert, Joan	Featured Gilbert, the second most intense Atlantic hurricane on record
1988	Eastern Pacific	23*	15*	7	Hector	24		Iva	
1988	Western Pacific	52	31	11	Nelson	786	$504 million	Roy	
1988	North Indian	9	3		Bangladesh	6,740	$13 million		
1988	South-West Indian (Jan.–July/Aug.–Dec.)	9	9	5	Gasitao	100	$10 million		
1988	Australia (Jan.–July/Aug.–Dec.)	8	8	4	Ezenina			Agi, Charlie, Herbie, Ilona	Included Herbie, the only tropical system to impact Western Australia in May
1988	South Pacific (Jan.–July/Aug.–Dec.)	6	6	3	Anne	5	$83 million	Anne, Bola	
1988	Worldwide	116	80	34	Gilbert	8,205	$5.47 billion	10	
1989	Atlantic	15	11	7	Hugo	136	$10.2 billion	Hugo	
1989	Eastern Pacific	25	18	9	Raymond	34	$1.75 million		
1989	Western Pacific	55*	32	20	Gordon and Elsie	3,328	$2.24 billion		
1989	North Indian	10*	3*	1*	Gay	1,785	$25 million		
1989	South-West Indian (Jan.–July/Aug.–Dec.)	11	10	6	Hanitra and Krisy	57	$217 million		
1989	Australia (Jan.–July/Aug.–Dec.)	13	12	6	Orson	6	$16.8 million	Ned, Orson	
1989	South Pacific (Jan.–July/Aug.–Dec.)	16	10	4	Harry	2	$5 million	Harry, Lili	
1989	Worldwide	124	90	51	Orson	5,348	$12.7 billion	5	
1990	Atlantic	16	14	8	Gustav	168	$150 million	Diana, Klaus	
1990	Eastern Pacific	27*	21	16	Trudy	19	$12.5 million		Tied for record number of hurricanes with 1992, 2014, and 2015
1990	Western Pacific	41*	31*	19	Flo	1,608	$5.25 billion	Mike	
1990	North Indian	12	2	1	BOB 01	1,577	$693 million		
1990	South-West Indian (Jan.–July/Aug.–Dec.)	10	8	4	Gregoara		$1.5 million		
1990	Australia (Jan.–July/Aug.–Dec.)	13	13	5	Alex			Tina, Ivor, Joy	
1990	South Pacific (Jan.–July/Aug.–Dec.)	10	6	3	Ofa	11	$205 million	Ofa, Peni, Sina	
1990	Worldwide	124	92	56	Flo	3,383	$6.3 billion	9	
1991	Atlantic	12	8	4	Claudette	30	$1.7 billion	Bob	
1991	Eastern Pacific	16	14	10	Kevin	11		Fefa	
1991	Western Pacific	38*	28	17	Yuri	5,505	$10.1 billion	Mireille, Thelma	
1991	North Indian	8	3	1	BOB 01	138,906	$1.5 billion		Included the fifth-deadliest tropical cyclone on record
1991	South-West Indian (Jan.–July/Aug.–Dec.)	13	10	3	Bella	90			
1991	Australia (Jan.–July/Aug.–Dec.)	12	9	3	Graham	56	$63.9 million		
1991	South Pacific (Jan.–July/Aug.–Dec.)	5	4	2	Val and Wasa	18	$360 million	Tia, Val, Wasa	
1991	Worldwide	103	76	40	Yuri	144,616	$13.7 billion	7	
1992	Atlantic	10	7	4	Andrew	106	$27.3 billion	Andrew	Included one subtropical storm
1992	Eastern Pacific	30	27	16	Tina	25	$3.15 billion	Iniki	Record number of tropical storms Tied for record number of hurricanes with 1990, 2014, and 2015
1992	Western Pacific	40	31	16	Gay	399	$6.24 billion	Omar	
1992	North Indian	13	7*	1	Forrest	400	$69 million		
1992	South-West Indian (Jan.–July/Aug.–Dec.)	12	9	3	Heather				
1992	Australian (Jan.–July/Aug.–Dec.)	13	11	9	Neville	7	$13.9 million	Mark, Ian, Nina	
1992	South Pacific (Jan.–July/Aug.–Dec.)	12	10	6	Fran	29	$111 million	Betsy, Esau, Fran, Joni, Kina	
1992	Worldwide	121	93	49	Gay	966	$36.9 billion	11	
1993	Atlantic	10	8	4	Emily	382	$322 million		
1993	Eastern Pacific	18*	15	11	Lidia	50	$1.74 billion		
1993	Western Pacific	49	28	15	Koryn	758	$1.96 billion		
1993	North Indian	4	2	2	BOB 02	714	$216 million		Featured record inactivity
1993	South-West Indian (Jan.–July/Aug.–Dec.)	14	11	4	Edwina	20			
1993	Australian (Jan.–July/Aug.–Dec.)	9	8	5	Oliver	2		Oliver, Polly, Roger, Naomi	
1993	South Pacific (Jan.–July/Aug.–Dec.)	10	8	4	Prema	2	$60 million	Prema, Rewa	
1993	Worldwide	110	78	44	Koryn	1,928	$4.3 billion	6	
1994	Atlantic	12	7	3	Florence	1,189	$1.93 billion		
1994	Eastern Pacific	22	20	10	Gilma	4	$20 million		Tied for most Category 5 hurricanes (with 2002 and 2018); Included John, the second longest lasting tropical cyclone on record
1994	Western Pacific	52	36	19	Melissa and Seth	1,287	$8.14 billion		
1994	North Indian	5	4	2	BOB 02	418	$240 million		
1994	South-West Indian (Jan.–July/Aug.–Dec.)	15	12	9	Geralda	484	$165 million		
1994	Australian (Jan.–July/Aug.–Dec.)	11	10	6	Theodore			Pearl, Quenton, Theodore Sharon, Annette	
1994	South Pacific (Jan.–July/Aug.–Dec.)	6	5	3	Theodore			Rewa	
1994	Worldwide	120	91	50	Geralda	3,279	$10.3 billion	6	
1995	Atlantic	21	19	11	Opal	182	$12.3 billion	Luis, Marilyn, Opal, Roxanne	Tied for fifth most active season on record
1995	Eastern Pacific	11	10	7	Juliette	124	$31 million	Ismael	Record inactivity for tropical depressions
1995	Western Pacific	47	24	8	Angela	1,314	$1.2 billion		
1995	North Indian	8	3	2	BOB 07	554	$46.3 million		
1995	South-West Indian (Jan.–July/Aug.–Dec.)	12	10	5	Marlene				
1995	Australia (Jan.–July/Aug.–Dec.)	11	9	8	Chloe	8	$8.5 million	Violet, Warren, Agnes, Gertie	
1995	South Pacific (Jan.–July/Aug.–Dec.)	1	1	0	William	2	$2.5 million	William	Featured record inactivity in the basin
1995	Worldwide	110	76	41	Angela	2,184	$13.5 billion	12	
1996	Atlantic	13	13	9	Edouard	248	$6.5 billion	Cesar, Fran, Hortense	
1996	Eastern Pacific	14*	9*	5*	Douglas	46			
1996	Western Pacific	52	31	16	Herb	935	$6.8 billion		
1996	North Indian	9	5	2	BOB 05	2,075	$1.9 billion		
1996	South-West Indian (Jan.–July/Aug.–Dec.)	13	9	5	Bonita	109	$50 million		
1996	Australia (Jan.–July/Aug.–Dec.)	21	17	6	Olivia	1	$57 million	Barry, Celeste, Ethel, Kirsty, Olivia, Fergus	Included Olivia, which produced the world's highest non-tornadic winds on record
1996	South Pacific (Jan.–July/Aug.–Dec.)	8	6	2	Beti	2	$5.6 million	Beti	
1996	Worldwide	130	87	44	Bonita	3,416	$15.3 billion	10	
1997	Atlantic	9	8	3	Erika	12	$111 million		Included one subtropical storm
1997	Eastern Pacific	24	19	9	Linda	261	$551 million	Pauline, Paka	
1997	Western Pacific	47	28	16	Ivan and Joan	4,181	$4.59 billion		Most Category 5's on record
1997	North Indian	10	4	1	BOB 01	1,197			
1997	South-West Indian (Jan.–July/Aug.–Dec.)	14	7	3	Helinda	275	$50 million		
1997	Australia (Jan.–July/Aug.–Dec.)	12	12	6	Pancho	34	$190 million	Rachel, Justin, Rhonda, Sid	
1997	South Pacific (Jan.–July/Aug.–Dec.)	19	16	7	Gavin	59	$143 million	Drena, Gavin, Hina, Keli, Martin, Osea	
1997	Worldwide	108	89	44	Linda	6,019	$5.6 billion	12	
1998	Atlantic	14	14	10	Mitch	12,010	$21.1 billion	Georges, Mitch	Second deadliest season on record Featured Mitch, the deadliest storm in the basin since 1780
1998	Eastern Pacific	16	13	6	Howard	54	$760 million		
1998	Western Pacific	30	16	8	Zeb	924	$951 million		
1998	North Indian	12	6	3	ARB 02	10,212	$3 billion		
1998	South-West Indian (Jan.–July/Aug.–Dec.)	20	5	1	Anacelle	88			
1998	Australia (Jan.–July/Aug.–Dec.)	13	11	6	Thelma	3	$8 million	Katrina	
1998	South Pacific (Jan.–July/Aug.–Dec.)	18	12	6	Ron and Susan	35	$33.6 million	Ron, Susan, Tui, Ursula, Veli, Cora	
1998	Worldwide	117	77	40	Zeb, Ron, and Susan	23,326	$25.8 billion	9	
1999	Atlantic	16	12	8	Floyd	195	$8.2 billion	Floyd, Lenny	
1999	Eastern Pacific	14	9	6	Dora	16			
1999	Western Pacific	45	20	5	Bart	976	$18.4 billion		
1999	North Indian	8	4	3	BOB 06	15,780	$5 billion		Included the strongest tropical cyclone on record in the Bay of Bengal
1999	South-West Indian (Jan.–July/Aug.–Dec.)	11	7	2	Evrina	2	$800 million		
1999	Australia (Jan.–July/Aug.–Dec.)	12	9	6	Gwenda	6	$250 million (AUD)	Rona, Elaine, Gwenda, John	Featured Gwenda, the strongest tropical cyclone on record in the basin, tied with Inigo
1999	South Pacific (Jan.–July/Aug.–Dec.)	20	7	3	Dani			Dani, Frank	
1999	Worldwide	117	62	32	Gwenda	16,975	$32.6 billion	8	

=== 2000s ===
Year	Basin	Number of tropical cyclones	Number of named storms (Note: Tropical cyclones have been named throughout most of the world since the 1960s, and worldwide since 2004.)	≥64 knots (Note: Tropical cyclones with maximum sustained winds of at 64 knots (74 mph, 119 km/h) has been considered a "hurricane" on the Beaufort scale since it was designed by Admiral Sir Francis Beaufort by 1806, and is now classified a Category 1 on the Saffir–Simpson scale in the Atlantic and East Pacific Ocean, a typhoon in the West Pacific Ocean, a very severe cyclonic storm in the North Indian Ocean, a tropical cyclone in the South-West Indian Ocean, and a Category 3 on the Australian tropical cyclone intensity scale used for storms near Australia and in the South Pacific Ocean.) (74 mph, 119 km/h) sustained winds	Strongest storm	Deaths	Damage US$	Retired names	Notes
2000	Atlantic	19	15	8	Keith	79	$1.2 billion	Keith	Included one subtropical storm
2000	Eastern Pacific	22	19	6	Carlotta	27	$84 million		
2000	Western Pacific	51	23	13	Bilis	467	$7.11 billion		
2000	North Indian	6	5	2	BOB 05	238	$185 million		
2000	South-West Indian (Jan.–July/Aug.–Dec.)	16	8	4	Hudah	1,044	$800 million		Included one subtropical depression with gale-force winds
2000	Australia (Jan.–July/Aug.–Dec.)	13	12	7	Paul	0	$150 million (AUD)	Steve, Tessi, Rosita, Sam	
2000	South Pacific (Jan.–July/Aug.–Dec.)	19	6	4	Kim	1		Kim	
2000	Worldwide	121	85	42	Hudah	1,856	$9.5 billion	6	
2001	Atlantic	17	15	9	Michelle	105	$7.1 billion	Allison, Iris, Michelle	
2001	Eastern Pacific	19	15	8	Juliette	13	$401 million	Adolph	Featured Adolph, the first May hurricane to reach Category 4 strength in the basin
2001	Western Pacific	45	26	16	Faxai	1,287	$2.3 billion	Vamei	Featured Vamei, the closest tropical cyclone to the equator
2001	North Indian	6	4	1	ARB 01	108	$104 million		
2001	South-West Indian (Jan.–July/Aug.–Dec.)	13	8	4	Ando	4			
2001	Australia (Jan.–July/Aug.–Dec.)	13	10	2	Walter			Abigail	
2001	South Pacific (Jan.–July/Aug.–Dec.)	10	6	2	Waka	8	$52 million	Paula, Sose, Trina, Waka	
2001	Worldwide	119	82	42	Faxai	1,525	$9.9 billion	10	
2002	Atlantic	14	12	4	Isidore	53	$2.6 billion	Isidore, Lili	
2002	Eastern Pacific	21	16	8	Kenna	7	$101 million	Kenna	Tied for most Category 5 hurricanes (with 1994 and 2018)
2002	Western Pacific	44	26	15*	Fengshen	725	$9.5 billion	Chataan, Rusa, Pongsona	
2002	North Indian	7	4	0	BOB 04	182	$25 million		
2002	South-West Indian (Jan.–July/Aug.–Dec.)	15	13	10	Hary	106	$290 million		
2002	Australia (Jan.–July/Aug.–Dec.)	10	8	3	Chris	19	$1 million (AUD)	Chris	
2002	South Pacific (Jan.–July/Aug.–Dec.)	16	4	2	Zoe			Zoe	
2002	Worldwide	124	80	40	Zoe	1,092	$12.5 billion	8	
2003	Atlantic	21	16	7	Isabel	92	$4.4 billion	Fabian, Isabel, Juan	
2003	Eastern Pacific	17	16	7	Nora	23	$129 million		
2003	Western Pacific	45	21	14	Maemi	360	$5.7 billion	Yanyan, Imbudo, Maemi	
2003	North Indian	7	3	1	ARB 06	358	$163 million		
2003	South-West Indian (Jan.–July/Aug.–Dec.)	13	12	7	Kalunde	115	$3 million		Included one subtropical depression with hurricane-force winds
2003	Australia (Jan.–July/Aug.–Dec.)	12	11	5	Inigo	60	$12 million	Erica, Inigo,	Featured Inigo, tied with Gwenda for the most intense in the Australian basin
2003	South-West Indian (Jan.–July/Aug.–Dec.)	16	9	7	Erica	23	$293 million	Ami, Beni, Cilla, Heta	
2003	Worldwide	131	88	48	Inigo	1,031	$10.7 billion	12	
2004	Atlantic	16	15	9	Ivan	3,100+	$60.1 billion	Charley, Frances, Ivan, Jeanne	Included one subtropical storm
2004	Eastern Pacific	18	12	6	Javier				
2004	Western Pacific	45	29	19	Chaba	2,428	$18.1 billion	Sudal, Tingting, Rananim	
2004	North Indian	9	4	1	BOB 01	587	$130 million		First season with named cyclonic storms
2004	South-West Indian (Jan.–July/Aug.–Dec.)	18	9	5	Gafilo	396	$250 million		Included Gafilo, the strongest cyclone on record in the basin
2004	Australia (Jan.–July/Aug.–Dec.)	10	9	3	Fay		$22 million (AUD)	Monty, Fay	
2004	South Pacific (Jan.–July/Aug.–Dec.)	15	3	1	Ivy	15	$7.8 million	Ivy	
2004	South Atlantic	1	1	1	Catarina	3	$350 million		First hurricane on record to strike Brazil
2004	Worldwide	129	80	44	Gafilo	6,529	$78.9 billion	10	
2005	Atlantic	31	28	15	Wilma	2,280+	$180 billion	Dennis, Katrina, Rita, Stan, Wilma	Tied (with 2020) for most hurricanes and major hurricanes Most tropical cyclones and Category 5's (4) in one season Most retired names Featured Wilma, the strongest storm on record in the basin Featured Katrina, tied as costliest storm on record Included 1 subtropical storm and 1 subtropical depression
2005	Eastern Pacific	17	15	7	Kenneth	6	$12 million		
2005	Western Pacific	33	24	13	Haitang	436	$7.6 billion	Matsa, Nabi, Longwang	
2005	North Indian	12	3	0	Pyarr	273	$21.4 million		
2005	South-West Indian (Jan.–July/Aug.–Dec.)	19	8	3	Juliet	78			
2005	Australia (Jan.–July/Aug.–Dec.)	14	10	6	Ingrid			Harvey, Ingrid	
2005	South Pacific (Jan.–July/Aug.–Dec.)	17	8	5	Percy		$55 million	Meena, Nancy, Olaf, Percy	
2005	Worldwide	141	94	49	Wilma	3,073	$188 billion	14	
2006	Atlantic	10	10	5	Gordon and Helene	14	$500 million		
2006	Eastern Pacific	25	19	11	Ioke	14	$355 million	Ioke	
2006	Western Pacific	40*	24*	15*	Yagi	3,886	$14.4 billion	Chanchu, Bilis, Saomai, Xangsane, Durian	
2006	North Indian	12	3	1	Mala	623	$6.7 million		
2006	South-West Indian (Jan.–July/Aug.–Dec.)	11	8	3	Carina	59			
2006	Australian (Jan.–July/Aug.–Dec.)	16	11	7	Glenda	1	$808 million	Clare, Larry, Glenda, Monica	
2006	South Pacific (Jan.–July/Aug.–Dec.)	20	7	5	Xavier				
2006	Worldwide	132	80	46	Yagi & Glenda	4,597	$16 billion	10	
2007	Atlantic	17	15	6	Dean	423	$3 billion	Dean, Felix, Noel	Included one subtropical storm Includes two Category 5 Hurricanes (Dean and Felix) that made landfall
2007	Eastern Pacific	15	11	4	Flossie	42	$80 million		
2007	Western Pacific	34	24	14	Sepat	388	$7.5 billion		
2007	North Indian	11	4	2	Gonu	16,248	$9.7 billion		
2007	South-West Indian (Jan.–July/Aug.–Dec.)	17	11	6	Dora and Favio	172	$337 million		Included the 2nd wettest tropical cyclone on record
2007	Australia (Jan.–July/Aug.–Dec.)	13	9	4	George	152	$87.1 million	George, Guba	
2007	South Pacific (Jan.–July/Aug.–Dec.)	12	5	1	Daman	4		Cliff, Daman	
2007	Worldwide	115	87	37	George	17,429	$20.7 billion	7	
2008	Atlantic	17	16	8	Ike	1,047	$49.5 billion	Gustav, Ike, Paloma	Only year on record in which a major hurricane existed in every month from July through November
2008	Eastern Pacific	19	17	7	Norbert	45	$152 million	Alma	
2008	Western Pacific	40	22	11	Jangmi	1,936	$5.9 billion		
2008	North Indian	10	4	1	Nargis	138,927	$14.7 billion		Second-costliest North Indian cyclone season on record Featured Nargis, the 5th deadliest tropical cyclone on record
2008	South-West Indian (Jan.–July/Aug.–Dec.)	12	10	9	Hondo	123	$38 million		
2008	Australian (Jan.–July/Aug.–Dec.)	14	7	3	Billy	1	$22.4 million	Helen	
2008	South Pacific (Jan.–July/Aug.–Dec.)	13	7	1	Funa	12	$64.2 million	Funa, Gene	
2008	Worldwide	124	83	40	Jangmi	142,091	$70.3 billion	7	
2009	Atlantic	11	9	3	Bill	9	$58 million		
2009	Eastern Pacific	23	20	8	Rick	16	$188 million		
2009	Western Pacific	41*	22	13	Nida	2,348	$10.5 billion	Morakot, Ketsana, Parma	
2009	North Indian	8	4	0	Aila	421	618 million		
2009	South-West Indian (Jan.–July/Aug.–Dec.)	15	11	4	Cleo	29			
2009	Australian (Jan.–July/Aug.–Dec.)	17	9	3	Hamish	2	$123 million	Hamish, Laurence	
2009	South Pacific (Jan.–July/Aug.–Dec.)	14	5	0	Lin and Mick	6	$64.2 million	Mick	
2009	Worldwide	126	78	31	Nida	2,831	$11.5 billion	6	
2010	Atlantic	21	19	12	Igor	314	$4.53 billion	Igor, Tomas	Tied for fifth most active season on record Tied for second most hurricanes in a season on record
2010	Eastern Pacific	13*	8	3	Celia	268	$1.62 billion		Least active Pacific hurricane season on record tied with 1977
2010	Western Pacific	29	14	7	Megi	384	$2.96 billion	Fanapi	Quietest Pacific typhoon season on record
2010	North Indian	8	6	5	Giri	402	$2.99 billion		
2010	South-West Indian (Jan.–July/Aug.–Dec.)	11	7	4	Edzani	85			
2010	Australia (Jan.–July/Aug.–Dec.)	15	9 (Note: TCWC Jakarta named Tropical Cyclone Anggrek, but TCWC Perth declassified Anggrek as a tropical cyclone because gale-force winds never extended more than halfway around the system center.)	3	Ului	4	$758 million	Magda	
2010	South Pacific (Jan.–July/Aug.–Dec.)	12	7	5	Ului	7	$132 million	Oli, Pat, Tomas, Ului	
2010	Worldwide	102	67	39	Megi	1,464	$12.9 billion	8	
2011
2011	Atlantic	20	19	7	Ophelia	114	$18.6 billion	Irene	Tied for fifth most active season on record
2011	Eastern Pacific	13	11	10	Dora	43	$204 million		
2011	Western Pacific	39	21	8	Songda	3,111	$7.18 billion	Washi	
2011	North Indian	10	2	1	Thane	360	$277 million		
2011	South-West Indian (Jan.–July/Aug.–Dec.)	11	4	2	Bingiza	77			Included one subtropical depression with gale-force winds
2011	Australia (Jan.–July/Aug.–Dec.)	26	10	6	Yasi	3	$3.52 billion	Carlos	
2011	South Pacific (Jan.–July/Aug.–Dec.)	17	7	5	Wilma	13	$33 million	Vania, Wilma, Yasi, Atu	
2011	South Atlantic	1	1						
2011	Worldwide	132	72	39	Songda	3,721	$29.8 billion	7	
2012	Atlantic	19	19	10	Sandy	354	$78 billion	Sandy	Tied for fifth most active season Tied (with 2016 and 2020) for most active season before July; Record tying 8 named storms forming in August
2012	Eastern Pacific	17	17	10	Emilia	8	$27.9 million		
2012	Western Pacific	35	25	14	Sanba	2,487	$20.5 billion	Vicente, Bopha	Second costliest season ever recorded
2012	North Indian	5	2	0	Nilam	128	$56.7 million		
2012	South-West Indian (Jan.–July/Aug.–Dec.)	15	13	4	Funso	164			Included one subtropical depression with gale-force winds
2012	Australia (Jan.–July/Aug.–Dec.)	19	7	2	Lua	16	$230 million	Heidi, Jasmine, Lua	
2012	South Pacific (Jan.–July/Aug.–Dec.)	24	7	5	Jasmine	27	$333 million	Evan, Freda	
2012	Worldwide	131	89	45	Sanba	3,184	$99 billion	8	
2013	Atlantic	15	14	2	Humberto	47	$1.51 billion	Ingrid	Included one subtropical storm Tied (with 1982) for fewest hurricanes since 1930
2013	Eastern Pacific	21	20	9	Raymond	181	$4.2 billion	Manuel	Featured Manuel, the second costliest Pacific hurricane on record Second costliest Eastern Pacific hurricane season on record
2013	Western Pacific	49	31*	13	Haiyan	8,513	$25.7 billion	Sonamu, Utor, Fitow, Haiyan	Deadliest season since 1975 Featured Haiyan, the second strongest storm to make landfall on record
2013	North Indian	10	5	3	Phailin	323	$1.5 billion		
2013	South-West Indian (Jan.–July/Aug.–Dec.)	10	10	7	Bruce	137	$89.2 million		
2013	Australia (Jan.–July/Aug.–Dec.)	18	11	6	Narelle	20	$2.2 billion	Oswald, Rusty	
2013	South Pacific (Jan.–July/Aug.–Dec.)	22	3	2	Sandra				
2013	Worldwide	139	67	41	Haiyan	9,221	$35.2 billion	8	
2014	Atlantic	9	8	6	Gonzalo	21	$439 million		
2014	Eastern Pacific	23	22	16	Marie	49	$1.6 billion	Odile	Tied for record number of hurricanes with 1990, 1992 and 2015
2014	Western Pacific	32*	23*	11*	Vongfong	576	$12.4 billion	Rammasun	Highest amount of Category 5 Typhoons since 1997.
2014	North Indian	8	3	2	Nilofar	183	$3.4 billion		Tied for record earliest (with 2019)
2014	South-West Indian (Jan.–July/Aug.–Dec.)	15	10	3	Hellen	8			
2014	Australia (Jan.–July/Aug.–Dec.)	17	9	4	Ita	22	$1.15 billion	Ita	
2014	South Pacific (Jan.–July/Aug.–Dec.)	19	6	2	Ian	12	$48 million	Ian, Lusi	
2014	Worldwide	121	78	42	Vongfong	871	$19 billion	5	
2015	Atlantic	12	11	4	Joaquin	89	$732 million	Erika, Joaquin	
2015	Eastern Pacific	31	26	16	Patricia	44	$565 million	Patricia	Record number of tropical depressions Tied for record number of hurricanes with 1990, 1992 and 2014; Featured Patricia, the strongest hurricane in the Western Hemisphere
2015	Western Pacific	39*	27*	18*	Soudelor	350	$14.8 billion	Soudelor, Mujigae, Koppu, Melor	
2015	North Indian	12	4	2	Chapala	363	$379 million		
2015	South-West Indian (Jan.–July/Aug.–Dec.)	12	11	3	Eunice	111	$46 million		Record number of very intense tropical cyclones
2015	Australia (Jan.–July/Aug.–Dec.)	14	7	6	Marcia	2	$732 million	Lam, Marcia	
2015	South Pacific (Jan.–July/Aug.–Dec.)	19	8	2	Pam	17	$360 million	Pam, Ula	
2015	Worldwide	136	92	49	Patricia	976	$17.6 billion	11	
2016	Atlantic	16	15	7	Matthew	748	$16.1 billion	Matthew, Otto	Tied (with 2012 and 2020) for most active season before July Featured Matthew, the first Category 5 in 9 years
2016	Eastern Pacific	23*	22*	13	Seymour	11	$95.8 million		Earliest season on record
2016	Western Pacific	51	26	13	Meranti	972	$18.9 billion	Meranti, Sarika, Haima, Nock-ten	
2016	North Indian	9	4	1	Vardah	401	$717 million		
2016	South-West Indian (Jan.–July/Aug.–Dec.)	8	6	3	Fantala	13	$4.5 million		Included one subtropical depression with gale-force winds
2016	Australia (Jan.–July/Aug.–Dec.)	19	4	0	Stan				Featured record inactive season
2016	South Pacific (Jan.–July/Aug.–Dec.)	16	6	4	Winston	49	$1.4 billion	Winston	Featured Winston, the strongest storm on record in the Southern Hemisphere
2016	Worldwide	140	81	41	Winston	2,194	$43.7 billion	7	
2017	Atlantic	18	17	10	Maria	3,364	$282 billion	Harvey, Irma, Maria, Nate	Costliest hurricane season on record Highest rainfall produced by a tropical cyclone in the United States and its territories First-ever three Category 4 U.S. hurricane landfalls in a single season Second season to feature multiple Category 5 landfalls after 2007 Featured Harvey, tied as most costly storm on record
2017	Eastern Pacific	20	18	9	Fernanda	45	$69 million		Featured Selma, the first tropical storm to make landfall in El Salvador
2017	Western Pacific	41	27	11	Lan	860	$14.3 billion	Hato, Kai-tak, Tembin	First season on record to feature no Category 5 equivalent typhoons since 1977
2017	North Indian	10	3	1	Ochki	834	$3.65 billion		
2017	South-West Indian (Jan.–July/Aug.–Dec.)	8	5	3	Enawo	449	$272 million		
2017	Australia (Jan.–July/Aug.–Dec.)	28	11	3	Ernie	57	$2.82 billion	Debbie	
2017	South Pacific (Jan.–July/Aug.–Dec.)	20	4	2	Donna	3	$48 million	Cook, Donna	
2017	Worldwide	141	85	39	Maria	2,698	$303 billion	10	Costliest Tropical Cyclone year on record.
2018	Atlantic	16	15	8	Michael	173	$49.9 billion	Florence, Michael	Included one subtropical storm
2018	Eastern Pacific	26	23	13	Walaka	52	$1.57 billion		Tied for most Category 5 hurricanes (with 1994 and 2002)
2018	Western Pacific	44*	29*	13	Kong-rey & Yutu	771	$18.4 billion	Rumbia, Mangkhut, Yutu	
2018	North Indian	14	7	3	Mekunu	343	$4.3 billion		
2018	South-West Indian (Jan.–July/Aug.–Dec.)	13	12	8	Cilida	35	$59 million		
2018	Australia (Jan.–July/Aug.–Dec.)	27	11	3	Marcus	1	$190 million	Marcus	
2018	South Pacific (Jan.–July/Aug.–Dec.)	16	8	3	Gita	11	$337 million	Gita, Josie, Keni	
2018	Worldwide	150	104	51	Kong-rey & Yutu	1,497	$74.9 billion	9	
2019	Atlantic	20	18	6	Dorian	98	$12 billion	Dorian	Included Hurricane Dorian, tied for the highest sustained winds at landfall
2019	Eastern Pacific	21	19	7	Barbara	7	$16.1 million		Latest date for the first depression to form since reliable records began in 1971
2019	Western Pacific	52	29	17	Halong	388	$34.1 billion	Lekima, Faxai, Hagibis, Kammuri, Phanfone	Costliest season on record.
2019	North Indian	12*	8*	6	Kyarr	173	$11.5 billion		Tied for record earliest (with 2014); Featured record number of very intense tropical cyclones Featured Cyclone Kyarr, the strongest tropical cyclone on record in the Arabian Sea
2019	South-West Indian (Jan.–July/Aug.–Dec.)	15*	13*	11	Kenneth & Ambali	1,721	$3.65 billion		Record storms, cyclones, and intense tropical cyclones in a single season Costliest season Featured Idai, the deadliest tropical cyclone in the basin Featured Kenneth, the strongest tropical cyclone to strike Mozambique on record
2019	Australia (Jan.–July/Aug.–Dec.)	16	8	5	Veronica	14	$1.72 billion	Trevor, Veronica	
2019	South Pacific (Jan.–July/Aug.–Dec.)	11	6	3	Pola		$1.43 million	Pola, Sarai	
2019	South Atlantic	2	2	0	Iba				
2019	Worldwide	143	105	56	Halong	2,090	$60.6 billion	10	
2020	Atlantic	31	30	14	Iota	417	$51.146 billion	Laura, Eta, Iota	Most active Atlantic hurricane season in recorded history Tied (with 2012 and 2016) for most active season on record before July Most storms forming in September on record (10)
2020	Eastern Pacific	21	17	4	Marie	47	$250 million		Featured the earliest recorded tropical cyclone east of 140W
2020	Western Pacific	32	23	10	Goni	457	$4.06 billion	Vongfong, Linfa, Molave, Goni, Vamco	Includes Goni, the strongest storm to make landfall on record.
2020	North Indian	9	5	3	Amphan	269	$15.8 billion		Included the second costliest storm on record in the basin
2020	South-West Indian (Jan.–July/Aug.–Dec.)	7	7	3	Ambali	46	$25 million		
2020	Australia (Jan.–July/Aug.–Dec.)	15	7	3	Damien	28	$4.3 million	Damien, Harold, Mangga	
2020	South Pacific (Jan.–July/Aug.–Dec.)	7	4	3	Yasa	34	$132 million	Tino, Yasa	
2020	South Atlantic	3	3	0	Kurumí	70	Unknown		
2020	Mediterranean	1	1	1	Ianos	4	$100 million		Featured Ianos, the strongest cyclone by sustained winds on record in the Mediterranean
2020	Worldwide	122	95	36	Goni	1,386	$71.5 billion	13	Most active tropical cyclone year on record
2021	Atlantic	21	21	7	Sam	158	>$55.178 billion	Ida	Third most active season on record
2021	Eastern Pacific	12	12	4	Felicia	5	$100 million		Featured the earliest recorded tropical storm east of 140W
2021	Western Pacific	25	12	3	Surigae	503	$2.04 billion	Conson, Kompasu, Rai	
2021	North Indian	3	2	2	Tauktae	194	$4.94 billion		
2021	South-West Indian (Jan.–July/Aug.–Dec.)	10	7	3	Faraji	34	$11 million		
2021	Australia (Jan.–July/Aug.–Dec.)	22	8	3	Niran	272	$519 million	Seroja, Seth	
2021	South Pacific (Jan.–July/Aug.–Dec.)	10	4	2	Niran	7	$448 million	Ana	
2021	South Atlantic	3	3	0	Raoni	70	Unknown		
2021	Worldwide	127	90	36	Surigae	1332	$79.1 billion	7	
2022	Atlantic	16	14	8	Fiona	337	>$120.425 billion	Fiona, Ian	Featured Fiona, the lowest recorded barometric pressure hurricane to hit Canada.
2022	Eastern Pacific	19 *	19 *	10 *	Darby	26	>$54.2 million		
2022	Western Pacific	36	25	10	Nanmadol	490	$3.384 billion	Malakas, Megi, Ma-on, Hinnamnor, Noru, Nalgae	
2022	North Indian	15	3	0	Asani	79	Unknown		
2022	South-West Indian (Jan.–July/Aug.–Dec.)	17 *	15 *	6 *	Darian	376	$312 million		
2022	Australia (Jan.–July/Aug.–Dec.)	30 *	9 *	3	Darian	4	>$75 million		
2022	South Pacific (Jan.–July/Aug.–Dec.)	11 *	5 *	2 *	Dovi	2	>$105 million	Cody	
2022	South Atlantic	1	1	0	Yakecan	2	$50 million		
2022	Worldwide	145	91	13	Nanmadol	1,316	>$124.4052 billion	9	
2023	Atlantic	21	20	7	Lee	18	$4.19 billion		
2023	Eastern Pacific	20	17	10	Otis	67	$13.071 billion	Dora, Otis	Featured Otis, the first Category 5 landfall in basin history and the costliest storm ever in the basin
2023	Western Pacific	29	17	10	Mawar	191	$36.92 billion	Doksuri, Saola, Haikui	
2023	North Indian	9	6	4	Mocha	523	$247 million		
2023	South-West Indian (Jan.–July/Aug.–Dec.)	7 *	7 *	5 *	Freddy	1,483	$675 million		Featured record number of very intense tropical cyclones
2023	Australia (Jan.–July/Aug.–Dec.)	20 *	5	5	Ilsa	9	$677 million	Freddy, Gabrielle, Ilsa, Jasper	Featured Cyclone Freddy, the longest-lasting tropical cyclone on record
2023	South Pacific (Jan.–July/Aug.–Dec.)	14 *	6 *	5 *	Kevin	17	$9.6 billion	Judy, Kevin, Lola, Mal	Costliest South Pacific Season and costliest in the Southern Hemisphere.
2023	South Atlantic	1	0	0	Unnamed	0			
2023	Mediterranean	1	1	0	Daniel	4,361	$21 billion		Featured Daniel, the costliest cyclone on record in the Mediterranean
2023	Worldwide	115	79	43	Mawar	6,642	>$92.715 billion	13	
2024	Atlantic	18	18	11	Milton	400	$128.072 billion	Beryl, Helene, Milton	Featured Beryl, the earliest Category 5 hurricane in the Atlantic by record, beating Emily in 2005. It featured Debby, the most costliest severe weather event to hit Quebec, Canada. Also featured Milton, the fifth strongest storm in the Atlantic basin's history by barometric pressure.
2024	Eastern Pacific	15	13	5	Kristy	29	$2.51 billion	John	
2024	Western Pacific	39	25	12	Yagi	1,255	$26.41 billion	Ewiniar, Yagi, Krathon, Trami, Kong-rey, Toraji, Usagi, Man-yi	
2024	North Indian	12	4	1	Remal	279	$2.31 billion		
2024	South-West Indian (Jan.–July/Aug.–Dec.)	15 *	13 *	8 *	Djoungou	151	>$1.21 billion		Featured Chido, the costliest cyclone ever in the basin; August–December was the first half of costliest season ever in the basin
2024	Australia (Jan.–July/Aug.–Dec.)	16 *	8 *	5 *	Olga	52	$675 million	Kirrily, Megan	
2024	South Pacific (Jan.–July/Aug.–Dec.)	9 *	2 *	0 *	Nat				
2024	South Atlantic	2	2	0	Akará				
2024	Worldwide	126	85	42	Milton	2,166	>$259.186 Billion	14	
2025	Atlantic	13	13	5	Melissa	128	>$6.555 billion	Melissa	Included one subtropical storm, Karen, which became the northernmost-forming system ever
2025	Eastern Pacific	20	20	11	Erick	38	>$326 million		Featured Erick, the earliest major hurricane on record to make landfall along the coast of Mexico
2025	Western Pacific	38	27	13	Ragasa	690	>$10.6 billion	Wipha, Co-May, Mitag, Ragasa, Bualoi, Matmo, Kalmaegi, Fung-wong	Included one unofficial tropical storm. A rare Category 4 typhoon (Neoguri) intensified in a high latitude, making it one of the strongest unusually high-latitude cyclones on record.
2025	North Indian	14	4	0	Shakhti	3,110	>$22.30 billion		Featured Senyar, the first cyclone to form at the Strait of Malacca as well as the costliest and deadliest cyclone of the year 2025
2025	South-West Indian (Jan.–July/Aug.–Dec.)	14 *	13 *	7 *	Vince	38	>$1.19 billion		First officially recognized Subtropical Storm in the basin (Kanto); January–July was second half of costliest season in basin history
2025	Australia (Jan.–July/Aug.–Dec.)	23 *	9	8	Zelia	2	>$1.983 billion	Zelia, Alfred	
2025	South Pacific (Jan.–July/Aug.–Dec.)	9 *	4	0	Rae	0	Unknown	Rae	
2025	Worldwide	131	90	44	Melissa	4,006	>$41.45 billion	12	

== See also ==
- Atlantic hurricane season
- Pacific hurricane season
- Pacific typhoon season
- North Indian Ocean cyclone season
- South-West Indian Ocean cyclone season
- Australian region cyclone season
- South Pacific cyclone season
- South Atlantic tropical cyclone
- Mediterranean tropical-like cyclone
