= 1880s Pacific typhoon seasons =

This article encompasses the 1880s Pacific typhoon seasons.

== 1880 season ==
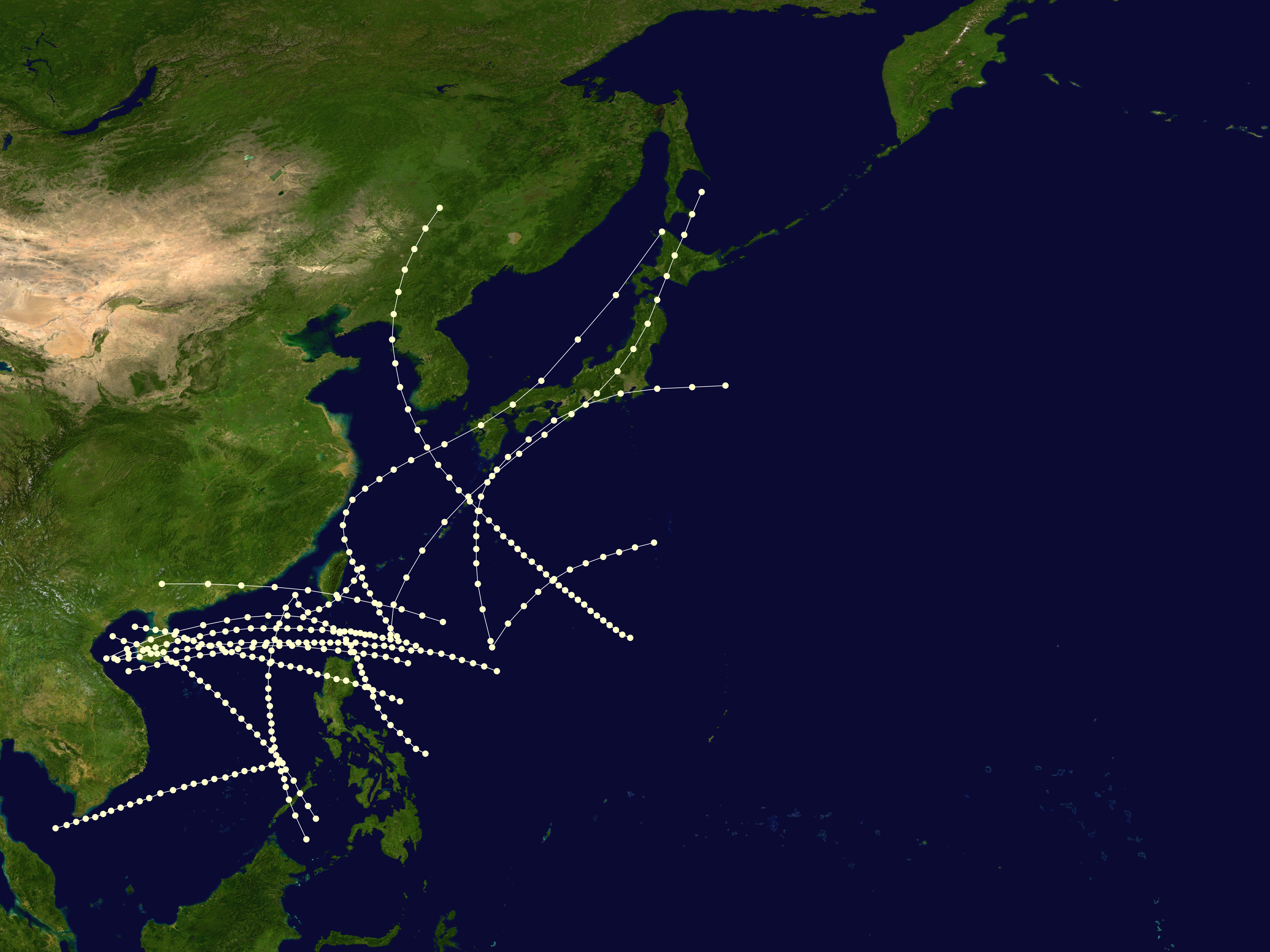
Season summary

There were 3 typhoons in the Western Pacific in 1880.

== 1881 season ==
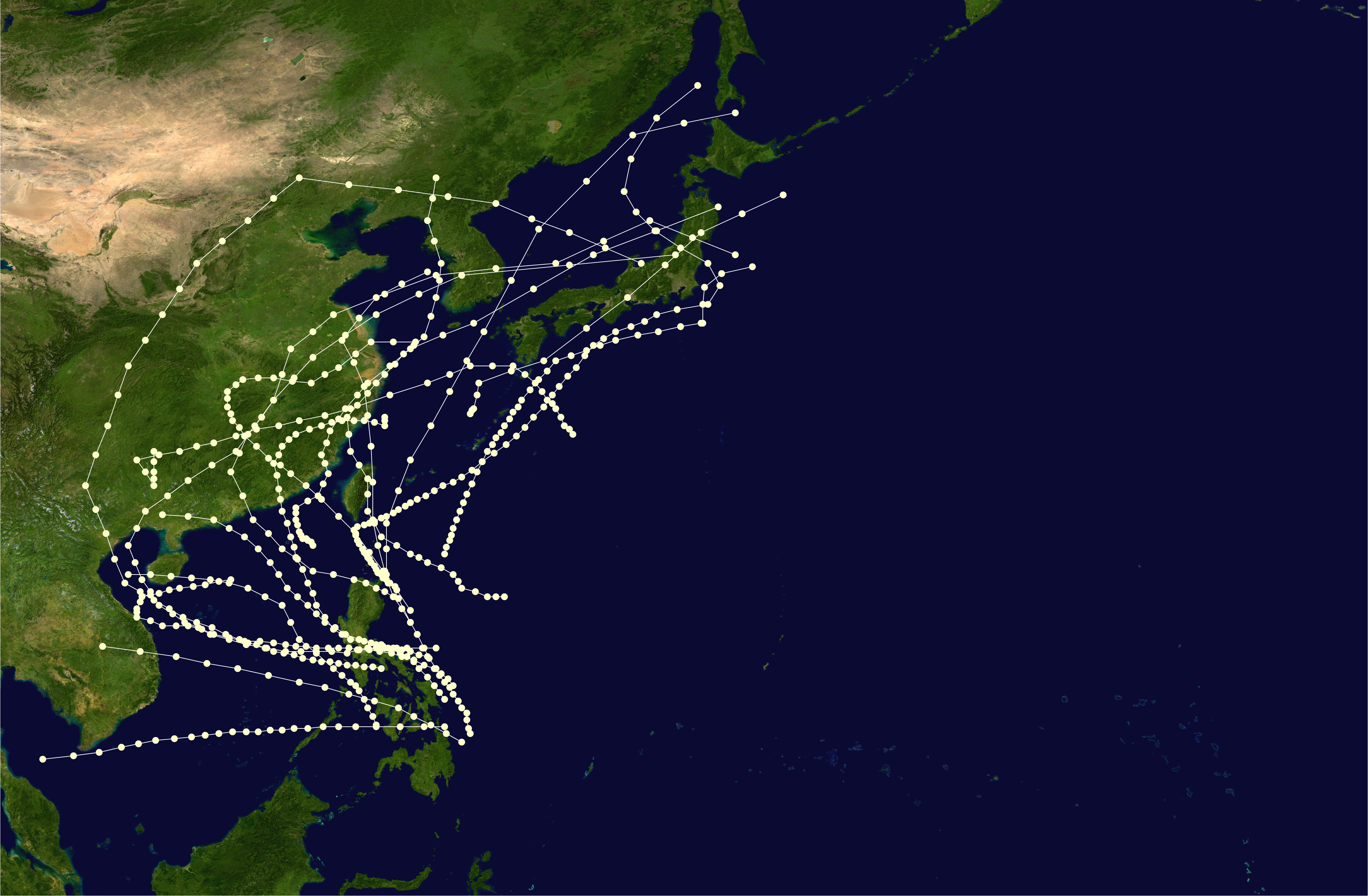
Season summary

There were 22 tropical cyclones in the Western Pacific in 1881, 21 of which intensified into typhoons.

In October, a powerful typhoon hit what is now the Philippines, before curving around Hainan Island and devastating Haiphong, Vietnam. In the Philippines, the typhoon is the deadliest in its history, with 20,000 fatalities recorded. Another 3,000 people were killed in Haiphong; there were reports that up to 300,000 people were killed by the typhoon in Haiphong – which would tie it with the 1839 Coringa cyclone as the second deadliest tropical cyclone on record – but this would prove to be erroneous, as Haiphong only had a population of less than 20,000 at that time.

== 1882 season ==
There were 12 tropical cyclones in the Western Pacific in 1882, 11 of which intensified into typhoons.

In October, a typhoon passed over Manila.

== 1883 season ==
There were 16 tropical cyclones in the Western Pacific in 1883, 15 of which intensified into typhoons.

== 1884 season ==
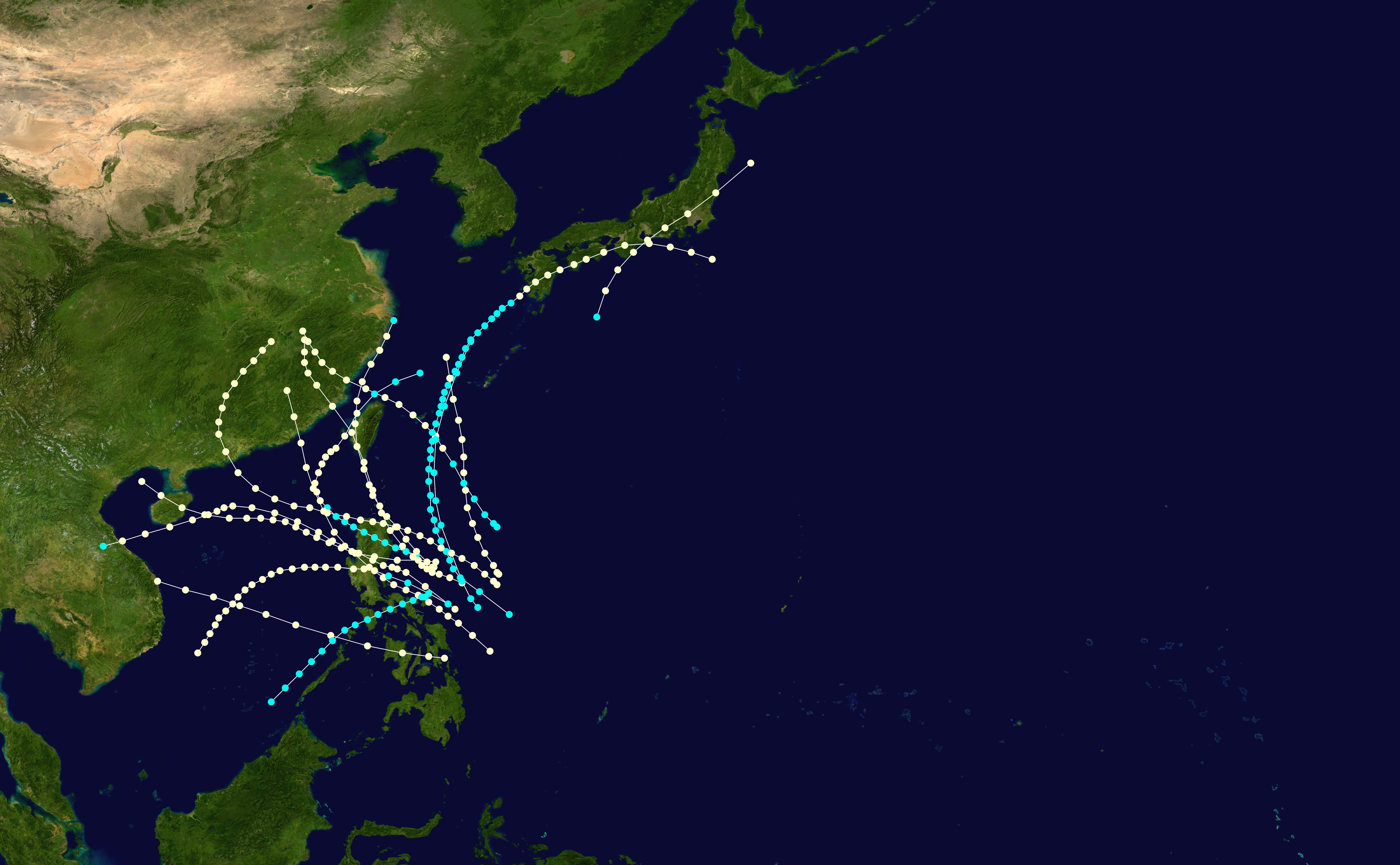
Season summary

There were 14 tropical cyclones in the Western Pacific in 1884.

== 1885 season ==
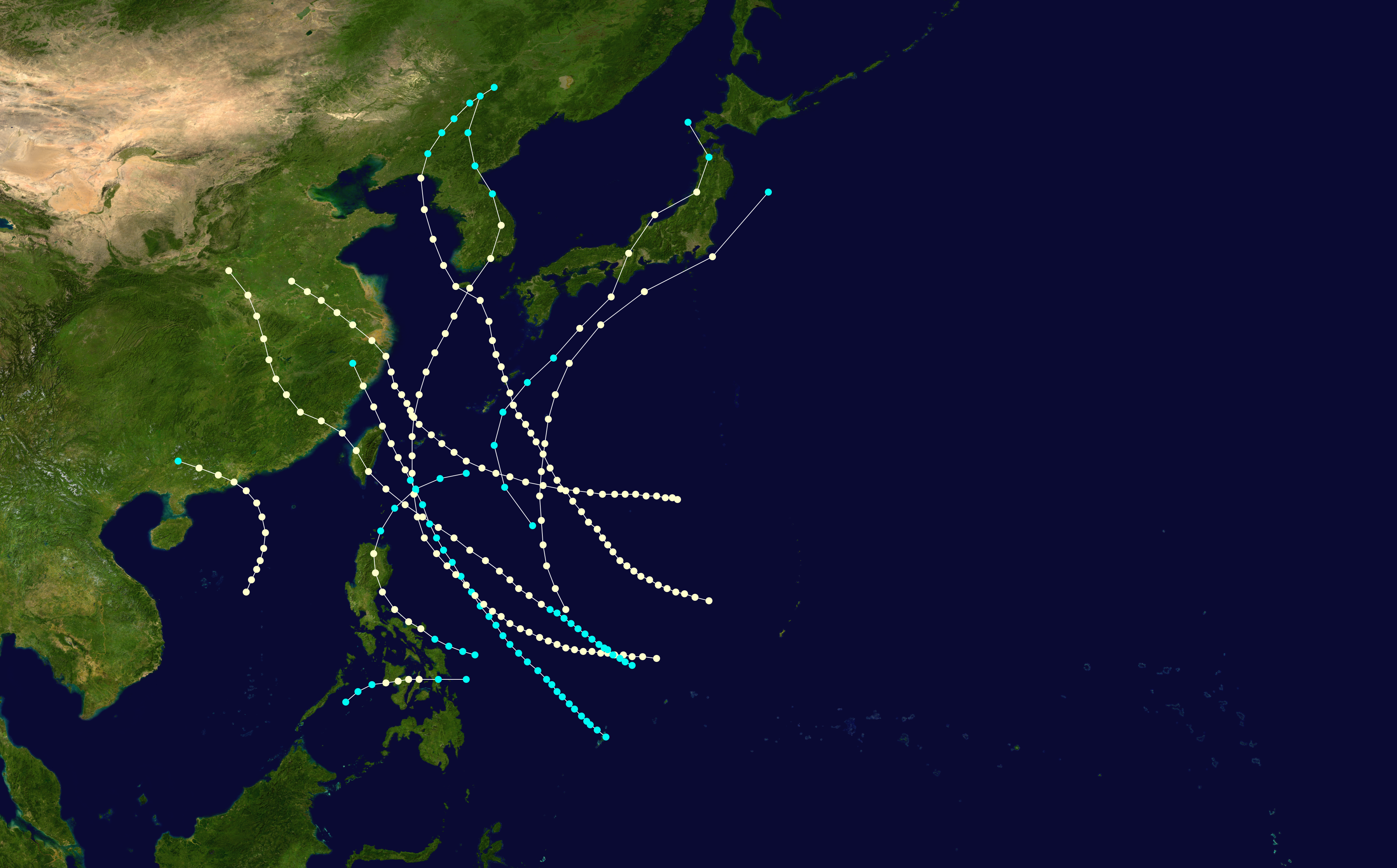
Season summary

There were 9 tropical cyclones in the Western Pacific in 1885.

== 1886 season ==
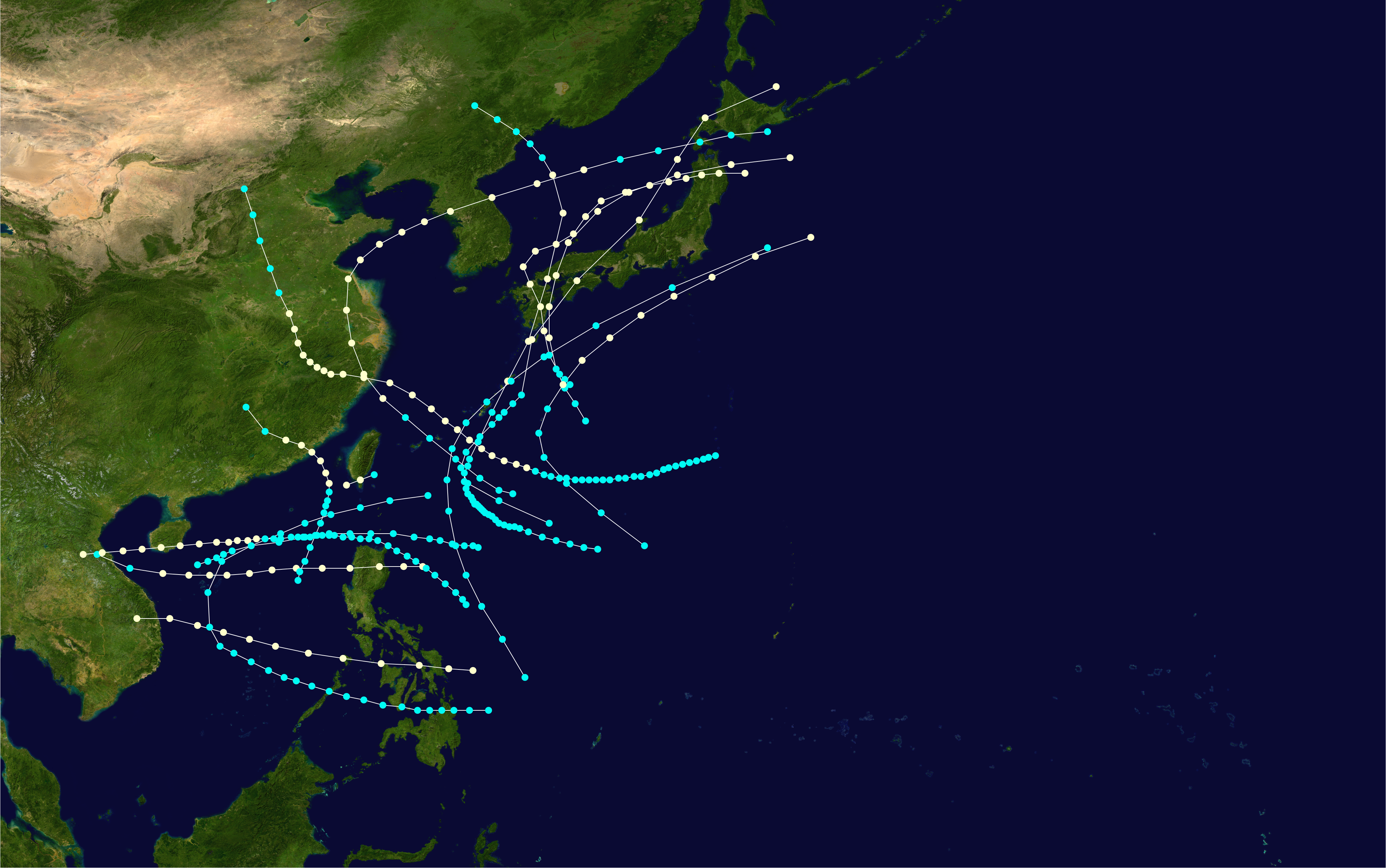
Season summary

There were 15 tropical cyclones in the Western Pacific in 1886.

== 1887 season ==
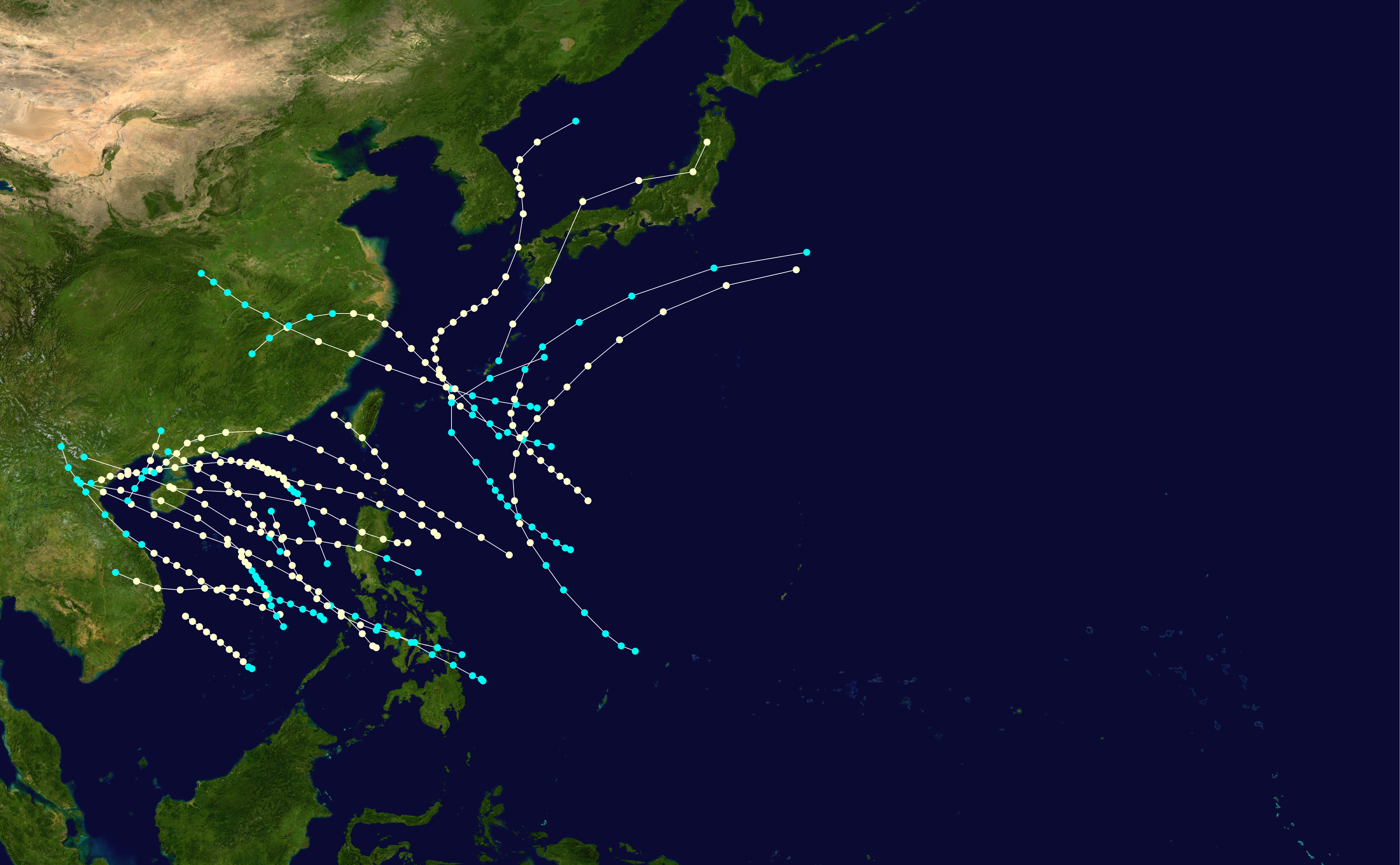
Season summary

There were 21 tropical cyclones in the Western Pacific in 1887.

== 1888 season ==
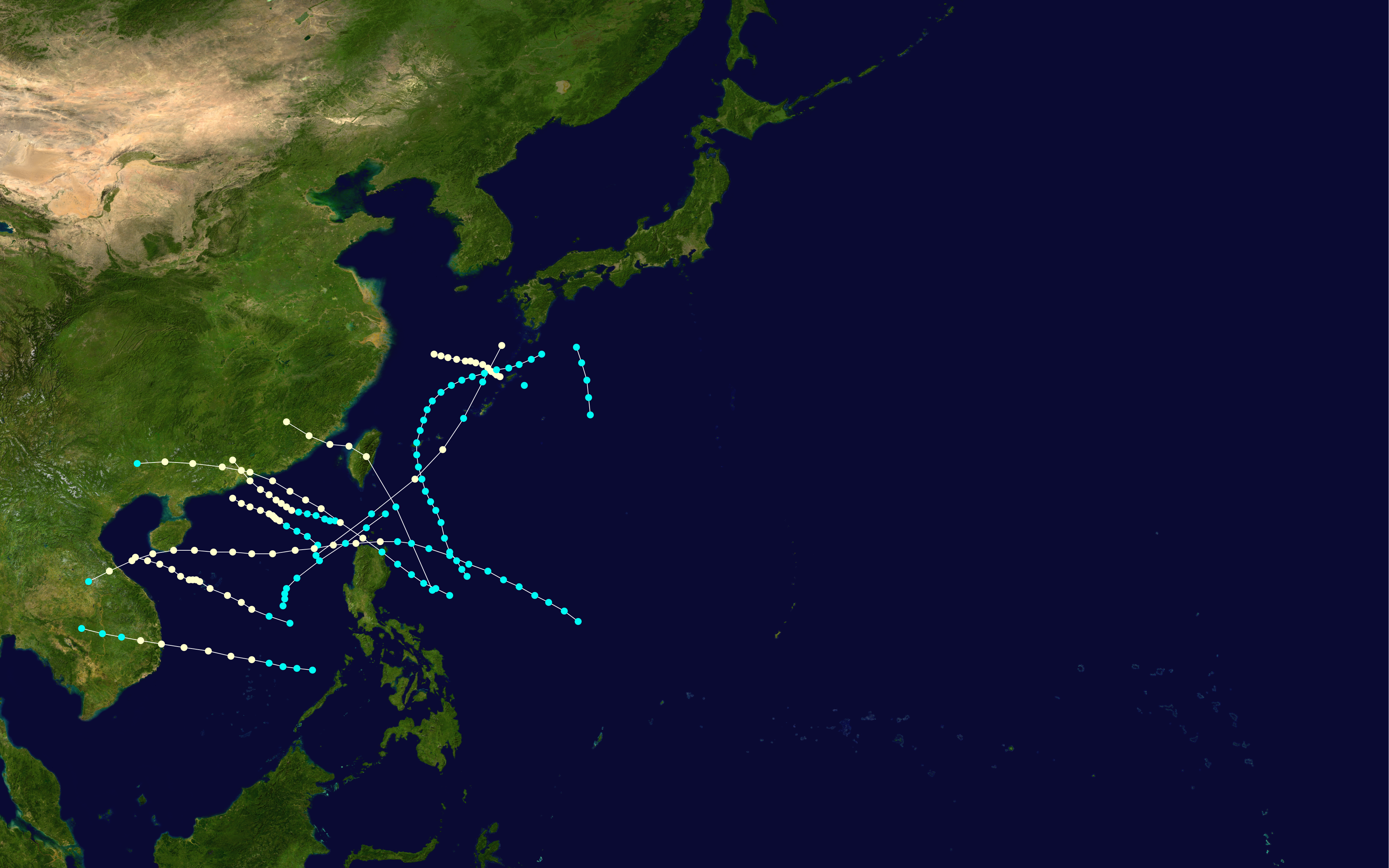
Season summary

There were 13 tropical cyclones in the Western Pacific in 1888.

== 1889 season ==
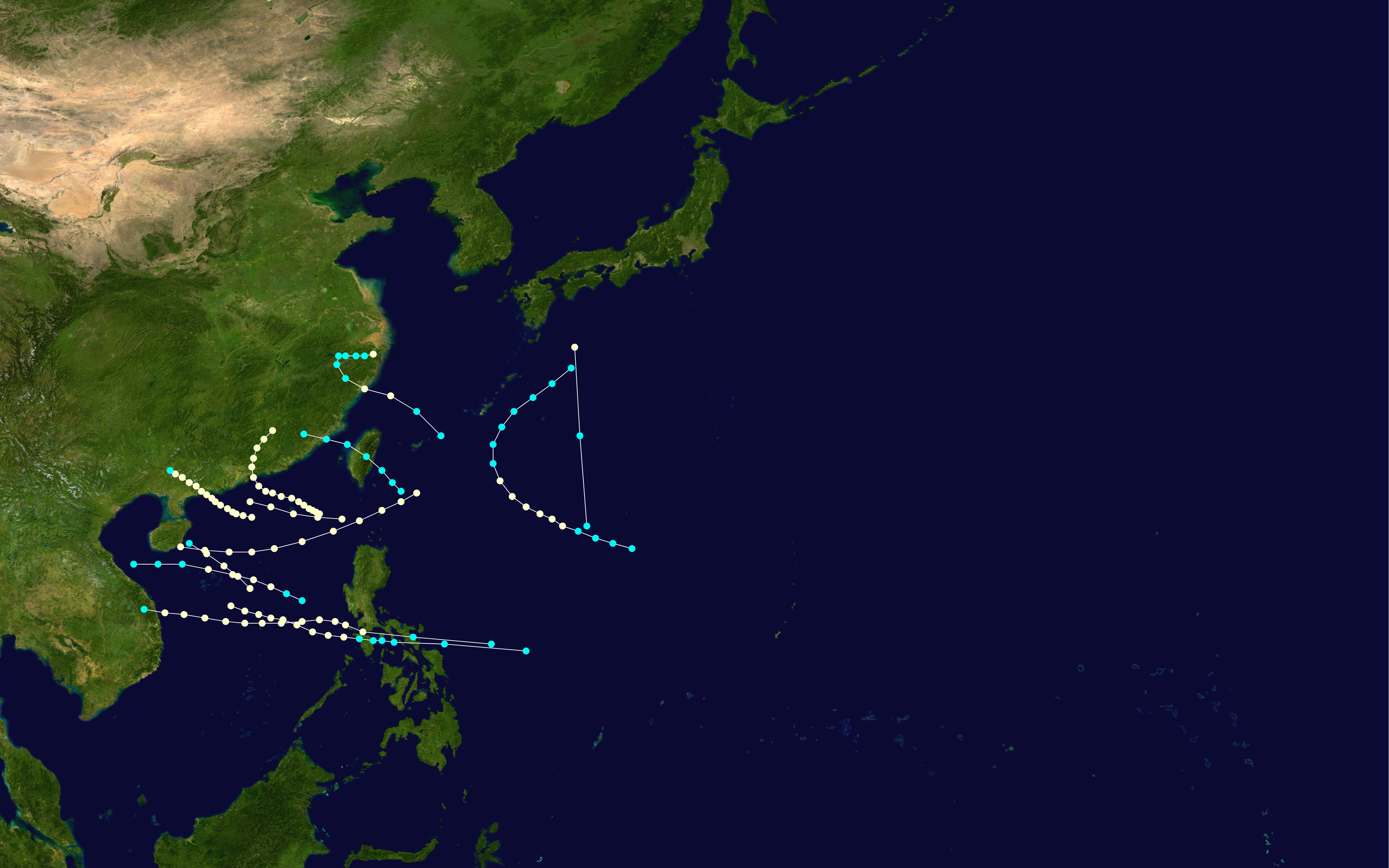
Season summary

There were 12 tropical cyclones in the Western Pacific in 1889.
