= 1864 Calcutta cyclone =

Tropical cyclone in the North Indian Ocean

Meteorological history
- Formed: 2 October 1864
- Dissipated: 7 October 1864

Unknown-strength storm
- Highest winds: >120 km/h (75 mph)

Overall effects
- Fatalities: 60,000+
- Areas affected: West Bengal, British Raj
- Part of the 1864 North Indian Ocean cyclone season

On 5 October 1864, most of the areas of Calcutta (present-day Kolkata), India were inundated and destroyed by a tropical cyclone. Dubbed the 1864 Calcutta cyclone, the storm caused over 60,000 fatalities in its wake. The cyclone crossed the coast of West Bengal to the south of Hooghly River, one of the streams that are included in the Ganges River Delta. The majority of the deaths were from drowning and the others from sicknesses prevailing before the storm. The said river overflowed due to a storm surge and as the water rushed inland, everything in its course was washed away. The city, the other surrounding areas, and some harbors had to be rebuilt after the cyclone. There was also a fundraising event established, but it failed. The total damages from the said storm were at Rs 99,200.

== Observations ==
The cyclone was first noted on 2 October to the west of Andaman Islands. However, a stormy pattern had been observed in the Andamans, starting on 27 to 30 September. Moneka, a ship to the west of the Andamans, experienced "dark, rainy, squally weather and west-southwestward winds, with a low barometer amount" on 1 October. The ship was heading west-northwest at that time and experienced these conditions until midnight. On the next day, the ship's course was still the same, the weather was described as cloudy but not raining. By afternoon, the sky looked very black and lowering (possibly referring to the barometer count) and the seas were rising. By midnight that day, the weather conditions were still the same. From observations in Port Blair and the ship Moneka, the vortex of the cyclone formed on the afternoon of 2 October. However, by yesterday, despite the weather observations at the capital of Andamans and the ship were stormy, there were no observations of a circulation (present-day tropical disturbance). On all available records, the developing cyclone possibly moved to the northwest then turned north. Another ship, dubbed Conflict' experienced light variable winds from west-northwest and north-northwest, starting from the sunrise of October 2. The sun rose up blood-red and the stars had a sickly appearance. The barometer is still being high on the said ship.

From midnight of 2 to 10 October am of the next day, the ship Moneka experienced a fresh breeze to the west while a very black sky is observed to the north. From 10 am onwards, heavy rains started to pour and winds started to impact the ship with short break intervals. The barometric pressure on the ship at that time is 29.61 inHg (1003 mbar). Another ship named Wayfarer which was bound for Calcutta had experienced strong breeze and deluge of rains on 2 and 3 October. Starting on 4 October, heavy rains and gusty winds impacted the shores of Calcutta and the nearby East Bengal. As the time progresses, the rain decreases but the wind remained strong. Three fires were present on Calcutta as the cyclone approaches. The cyclone crossed the coast the East Coast of India to the south of the Hooghly River on 5 October. A factory near the coast experienced hurricane-force winds and torrential rainfall, with the said river also rising. Dacca, 105 mi (169 km) from the cyclone, observed patterns of strong air which is "not that strong", based on observations of residents there. Thunderstorms were seen throughout the area on the night of 5 October, being accompanied by strong torrential rains. Some areas in the northeastern Indian state of Assam also seen rains and strong winds. The cyclone moved north-northeast and is believed to be dissipated on 7 October, inland, possibly near or on East Bengal (present-day Bangladesh).

== Impacts and aftermath ==
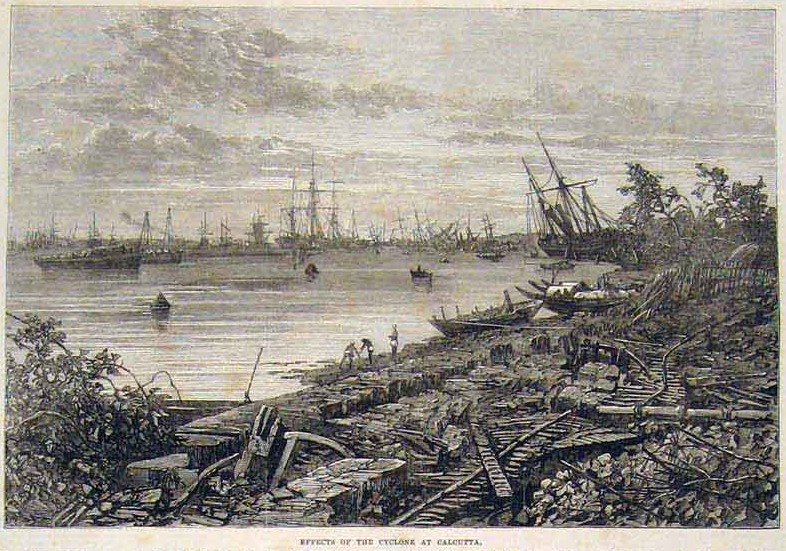
The damages in a port harbour on Calcutta.

At exactly 14:30 UTC (10:00 pm IST) on 5 October, as conditions calmed, some employees of the factory near the coast of Calcutta went outside to observe, founding that many trees were uprooted, kutcha houses destroyed and boats sunk. A rainfall amount of 24 inches (610 mm) were observed. The ports of Khejuri and Hijli were reported to be destroyed and many ships were either damaged and/or sank in the Bay of Bengal. Tens of thousands of straw and tiled huts were washed out and destroyed by strong winds. The Hooghly River overflowed, drowning an unknown people and a storm wave (storm surge) was also seen in the area, killing another unknown number of individuals. Dacca, which is nearly 170 kilometers south-southwest of the landfall point, also experienced the brunt of the storm. No major damage was seen, but some boats were destroyed in the waters off the Bay of Bengal.

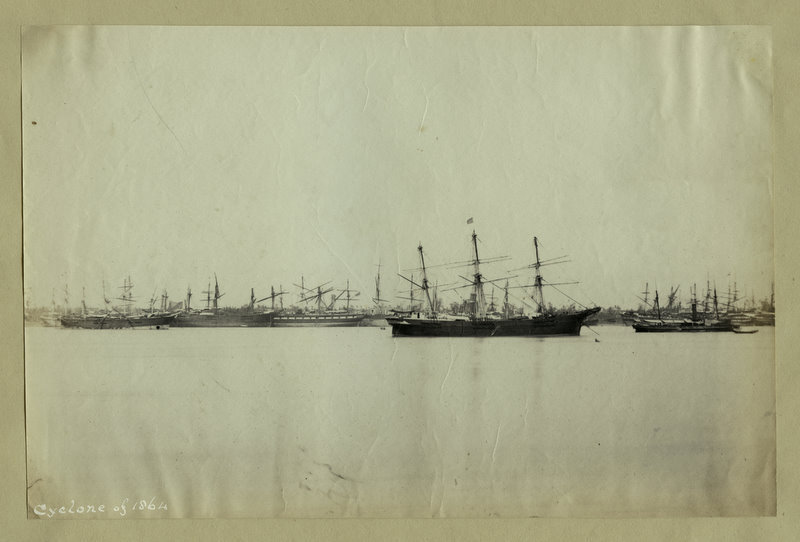
The ships on another harbour, possibly before the cyclone.

There were already a few sicknesses prevalent in Calcutta before the cyclone, namely cholera, dysentery and smallpox. In Midnapore, the deaths were mainly from these, but the total fatalities were unknown. The Pergunnah Gomai recorded 23 deaths from drowning and another estimated amount of 526 more from sickness. In Teraparah, the authorities there reported 132 victims of drowning and 515 deaths of the illnesses. In Mysaudal, the loss from the storm surge was at 3,740 and the sickness at 4,243. In Cassimnugger, the losses from drowning were at 686, while the sickness at an estimate of 496. No other reports of deaths were recorded, but it is estimated that the cyclone killed over 60,000. Telephone lines were downed and in total, Calcutta was heavily destroyed by this cyclone.

The total death toll from the cyclone was estimated at 60,000 (Note: No exact numbers existed.), mainly due to drowning while the total damages were at Rs 99,200 with the majority coming from dockyard building damages.

In the following months after the cyclone, the area, ports, and the whole city were rebuilt. Some residents of Calcutta started a fundraiser, but it failed.

== See also ==
- 1839 Coringa cyclone - another deadly cyclone in India during 1839.
- Cyclone Nargis - a deadly cyclone that killed over 138,300 individuals in Burma in 2008.
- 1970 Bhola cyclone - the deadliest tropical cyclone worldwide, with a death toll of over 500,000.
