= 1800s Atlantic hurricane seasons =

The decade of the 1800s featured the 1800s Atlantic hurricane seasons. While data is not available for every storm that occurred, some parts of the coastline were populated enough to give data of hurricane occurrences. Each season was an ongoing event in the annual cycle of tropical cyclone formation in the Atlantic basin. Most tropical cyclone formation occurs between June 1 and November 30.

== 1800 Atlantic hurricane season ==
=== Hurricane One ===
August 10–18. A minimal hurricane that passed through the Leeward Islands on August 10 moved through the Caribbean Sea and Gulf of Mexico to strike southeast Louisiana on August 18.

=== Hurricane Two ===
August 27–28. A hurricane struck Exuma in the Bahamas during August 27 and 28.

=== Hurricane Three ===
September 9–10. A hurricane impacted Bermuda during September 9 and 10. The storm dismasted the brig Eliza sailing from Savannah to New York, causing the loss of two lives from those swept overboard.

=== Hurricane Four ===
October 2–5. A hurricane lingered over South Carolina during October 2 to the 5th. Twelve ships foundered at Charleston. The cyclone spawned a tornado which moved across the northwest section of the city. Its storm surge swept across much of Sullivan's Island. One died in Charleston.

=== Hurricane Five ===
October 9. The ship, Galgo, was sunk during a hurricane on October 9 over the southwest Atlantic. All 25 crew members were rescued.

=== Hurricane Six ===
October 31-November 5. On October 31, a hurricane struck Jamaica before moving onward to Cuba and the southwest Atlantic. During November 4 and November 5, Bermuda experienced this hurricane. A lighthouse begun in 1795 on Wreck Hill was abandoned after this storm, as it was then determined to be an unsuitable site (from Beware the Hurricane.)

ARTICLE 4

== 1802 Atlantic hurricane season ==
=== Hurricane One ===
A hurricane was spotted west of Jamaica between October 6 and October 10.

=== Hurricane Two ===
A hurricane was reported in Jackson, (Adams) New Hampshire. There were so many trees blown down, the town could not perform survey. Recorded in Vol 7 page 185 of NH legislature.

== 1803 Atlantic hurricane season ==
=== Hurricane One ===
In August, a hurricane hit the West Indies. It continued through Jamaica, moved northward, and eventually hit England later in the month. It caused 121 deaths.

=== Hurricane Two ===
August 29. A hurricane hit near the Chesapeake Bay on August 29, causing at least one death.

=== Hurricane Three ===
The Carolina Hurricane of 1803 August 31-September 1. A minimal hurricane right on its heels of the prior one hit near New Bern, North Carolina on August 31 and September 1. This type of tropical cyclone succession up the coast is similar to the Connie/Diane East coast landfalls of 1955.

=== Hurricane Four ===
The Norfolk Storm of 1803 October 2–3. A hurricane reportedly impacted Norfolk, Virginia during October 2 and 3.

== 1804 Atlantic hurricane season ==
=== Hurricane One ===
August 18–19. During August 18 and 19, a hurricane was noted east of Bermuda, sinking the ship Alexander.

=== Hurricane Two ===
August 18–19. During August 18 and August 19, a hurricane struck Jamaica

=== Hurricane Three ===
August 29. A violent hurricane was noted in Jamaica on August 29.

=== Hurricane Four ===
1804 Antigua–Charleston hurricane, The Great Charleston Gale of 1804, or Hurricane Santa Rosalía of 1804

September 3–12. A hurricane was first spotted near the Leeward Islands on September 3. Most ships at harbor in St. Kitts, Antigua, St. Bartholomew, and Dominica were destroyed. Reported strongest hurricane to hit St. Kitts since 1772 one. It moved west-northwestward across western Puerto Rico and Turks Island on September 4. The storm turned northwest, negatively impacting September 6–7. It then moved northwest to hit Georgia as a major hurricane on September 7. It continued slowly through South Carolina and North Carolina, leaving the mainland on September 9 before striking New England on September 12. Reported strongest hurricane to hit Charleston since 1752 one. The hurricane caused 500 deaths. Damages to crops on St. Simons Island totaled $100,000 (1804 USD). Overall damages from Savannah totaled $500,000 (1804 USD), while Charleston incurred $1,000,000 in damages (1804 USD). Part of cluster of hurricanes struck Charleston area in 1804, 1811, 1813, 1820, and 1822.

=== Tropical Storm Five ===
September 22–24. A tropical storm tracked from Cuba northward to South Carolina during September 22 and September 24.

=== Hurricane Six ===
The Snow Hurricane of 1804

October 4–10. Later in the season, a major hurricane moved northwestward across the Western Atlantic to the north of Puerto Rico. It hit near Atlantic City, New Jersey on October 9, and turned northeastward. As it crossed New England, cool air was entrained in the circulation, and it became extratropical. The storm brought heavy snow across the Northeast, in some areas up to 2–3 feet, and killed 8 people. This was the first observation of snow from a landfalling hurricane, but not the last.

== 1805 Atlantic hurricane season ==
=== Hurricane One ===
Between July 27 and August 1, a hurricane tracked through the southwest Atlantic east of Bermuda.

=== Hurricane Two ===
On September 30, a hurricane struck Matanzas, Cuba then moved northward into Maine by October 3.

== 1806 Atlantic hurricane season ==
=== Hurricane One ===
The Great Coastal Hurricane of 1806

August 17–24. tropical cyclone was noted near the northeastern Lesser Antilles on August 17. Moving west-northwest, the cyclone strengthened into a major hurricane. As it moved offshore Georgia, coastal flooding occurred on Jekyll Island on August 22. The schooner L. T. was wrecked offshore St. Mary's, Georgia. Charleston, South Carolina experienced heavy rains and high winds which uprooted trees. Georgetown, South Carolina's lighthouse was leveled during the storm. The hurricane hit the southern North Carolina coast on August 23 and led to 42 deaths. It moved out to sea, disrupting British and French ships involved in the Napoleonic Wars. After struggling against the storm offshore the Mid-Atlantic coastline, the Rose in Bloom capsized offshore New Jersey on August 24, with a loss of 23 passengers.

=== Hurricane Two ===
A hurricane moved through the Mona Passage on August 26 before moving just offshore the East Coast of the United States through September 3.

=== Tropical Storm Three ===
A tropical storm caused damage in Vera Cruz, Mexico on September 8.

=== Hurricane Four ===
Hurricane San Vicente of 1806 September 8–18. A hurricane hit Dominica on September 9, resulting in 457 casualties. The hurricane subsequently moved through the Caribbean Sea and Gulf of Mexico, striking New Orleans on September 17 and Mississippi by September 18.

=== Hurricane Five ===
On September 15, a hurricane hit northeast Florida, destroying several houses but leading to no deaths.

=== Hurricane Six ===
On September 20, another hurricane hit Dominica, causing an additional 165 deaths.

=== Hurricane Seven ===
Between September 27–29, a minimal hurricane hit South Carolina, the Outer Banks of North Carolina destroying one ship on the 28th, and Virginia.

=== Tropical Storm Eight ===
During October 2, a tropical storm was witnessed at Jamaica. Moving northward, it struck South Carolina by October 9.

== 1807 Atlantic hurricane season ==
=== Tropical Storm One ===
A tropical storm moved through the Lesser Antilles on July 25.

=== Hurricane Two ===
Hurricane San Jacinto of 1807 impacted Puerto Rico from August 17 to 19. It was a slow moving hurricane, affecting the island for 50 hours. The excessive rain caused all rivers to overflow causing great floods that destroyed crops. Many lives and livestock were lost. It crossed Puerto Rico from Humacao in the east to Aguadilla in the west and later continued to the Dominican Republic and Cuba.

=== Tropical Storm Three ===
On September 1, another tropical storm moved through the Lesser Antilles, striking Trinidad de Cuba on September 5.

=== Hurricane Four ===
Between October 16 and October 20, this hurricane moved from the extreme southeastern Caribbean Sea near Tobago and Curacaoto the west of Jamaica.

== 1808 Atlantic hurricane season ==
=== Tropical Storm One ===
A tropical storm struck Puerto Rico this year.

=== Hurricane Two ===
A minimal hurricane hit the Outer Banks on September 12, damaging the lighthouse there.

== 1809 Atlantic hurricane season ==
=== Tropical Storm One ===
A tropical storm struck Dominica, Guadeloupe, Tortola, and Montserrat between August 1 and August 3, killing 62 people.

=== Tropical Storm Two ===
A tropical storm affected the northern Leeward Islands between October 9 and October 13.

== See also ==
- Lists of Atlantic hurricanes
- Atlantic hurricane season
