= 1850s Pacific typhoon seasons =

This article encompasses the 1850s Pacific typhoon seasons. The list is very incomplete; information on early typhoon seasons is patchy and relies heavily on individual observations of travellers and ships. There were no comprehensive records kept by a central organisation at this early time.

== 1850 season ==
A typhoon struck Manila Bay in the Philippines in May. Around 1850, a typhoon killed about 50 people on Rongelap Atoll in the Marshall Islands. Two fierce typhoons struck Japan in August and September 1850; the first one, a powerful storm comparable to the 1828 Siebold typhoon, struck Buzen Province in northeastern Kyushu and rolled through the Chugoku region on 18 August, destroying 459 houses in the Akizuki Domain (now central Fukuoka Prefecture) alone; and the second one affected much of western Japan between the Kyushu and Chubu regions on 12 September.

== 1851 season ==
A typhoon struck Passi in the Philippines in December.

== 1852 season ==
Typhoon at Miyako

Typhoon recorded at Miyako in the Ryukyu Islands. Miyako was also hit by a storm surge. 3,000 people died in the subsequent famine and disease.

A typhoon was also reported near Vietnam.

== 1853 season ==
On 17 July, ships near Okinawa reported falling pressure and increasing winds, a sign of an approaching storm. During the subsequent days, swells became stronger as the storm moved toward northeastern China. On 22 July, the barometer aboard USS Supply subsided to 28.74 inHg (973 mbar), and winds increased to force-10. The winds split the inner jib and the foresail of the British schooner Eament. The storm stalled off the east coast of China, and when the Eament encountered the eye, it reported a barometric pressure of 28.14 inHg (953 mbar). Turning back east, the storm moved through the Ryukyu Islands. The ship-based observations suggest a spatially enormous, slow moving tropical storm (or typhoon) in the East China Sea, and force-6 winds continued to be reported through 31 July.

In September 1853, a typhoon struck Guam.

== 1854 season ==
Typhoons were recorded at Okinawa in 1854.

== 1855 season ==
A typhoon struck Guam in September.

== 1856 season ==
A powerful typhoon struck Edo (modern-day Tokyo) on 23 September and briskly swept across eastern Japan through the 24th. Extensive property damage and many casualties were reported, most of which were caused by severe storm surges.

== 1858 season ==
There were two tropical cyclones in the western Pacific in 1858, one of which was a typhoon.

== 1859 season ==
A typhoon moving north-northeastward passed west of Hokkaido on 23 August. Strong winds were observed in the Oshima Peninsula.
