= 1870s Pacific typhoon seasons =

This article encompasses the 1870s Pacific typhoon seasons. While data is not available for every storm that occurred, some parts of the coastline were populated enough to give data of typhoon occurrences.

== 1870 season ==
There were 8 tropical cyclones in the Western Pacific in 1870, 6 of which were typhoons.

== 1871 season ==
There were 7 tropical cyclones in the Western Pacific in 1871, 5 of which were typhoons. In March, 11 people died when a typhoon wrecked their boat.

== 1872 season ==
There were 4 tropical cyclones in the Philippines in 1872, 2 of which were typhoons. In August 1872, a typhoon struck Guam.

== 1873 season ==
There were 6 tropical cyclones in the Western Pacific in 1873, 4 of which were typhoons. A typhoon in October killed at least 200 people in the Philippines.

Not included in the above number, a typhoon on July 21 ran several ships ashore in Amoy and Soonghing, China.

== 1874 season ==
There were 8 tropical cyclones in the Western Pacific in 1874, 6 of which were typhoons.

The 1874 Hong Kong typhoon hit Hong Kong during the night of Tuesday 22 September and the morning of Wednesday 23 September 1874. It killed about 10,000 people. A typhoon struck Ailinglaplap in the Marshall Islands, killing more than 300 people.

== 1875 season ==
There were 6 tropical cyclones in the Western Pacific in 1875, 4 of which were typhoons. A typhoon in December killed four people in the Philippines.

Not included in the above number, a typhoon on June 2 foundered the steamship Poyang at Macao, killing about 100 people and leaving only 16 survivors. Macao suffered severe damage from the storm, while damage in Hong Kong was light.

== 1876 season ==
There were two typhoons in the Western Pacific in 1876. One of them struck the Philippines in November, killing 150 people.

== 1877 season ==
There was at least one tropical cyclone in the Western Pacific in 1877.

== 1878 season ==
There were 4 tropical cyclones in the Western Pacific in 1878, 3 of which were typhoons.

== 1879 season ==
There were 9 tropical cyclones in the Western Pacific in 1879, 8 of which were typhoons.

Not included in the above number, the Italian steam corvette Vettor Pisani encountered a fierce typhoon between July 29 and August 1 in the Taiwan Strait. The vessel was damaged, listed by up to 40° and having lost sails, boats and doors. A few of the crew members sustained injuries.
