= 1839 Coringa cyclone =

Devastating tropical cyclone that affected the town of Coringa

On 25 November 1839, the port city of Coringa in present-day Andhra Pradesh on the southeastern coast of British India was battered by a tropical cyclone that destroyed the harbour. Known as the 1839 Coringa cyclone and sometimes also referred to as the 1839 India cyclone and 1839 Andhra Pradesh cyclone, its storm surge caused widespread damage. It killed over 300,000 people, making it the second-deadliest storm worldwide after the 1970 Bhola cyclone. Many ships were destroyed and houses were washed out by rising rivers and streams. Croplands were inundated and many animals drowned due to the floods and storm surge.

The port city was not rebuilt after the cyclone. Some individuals who survived the disaster rebuilt their homes far from the coast. Some British officials named the area Hope Island, hoping to protect the city from future environmental disasters.

== Background ==
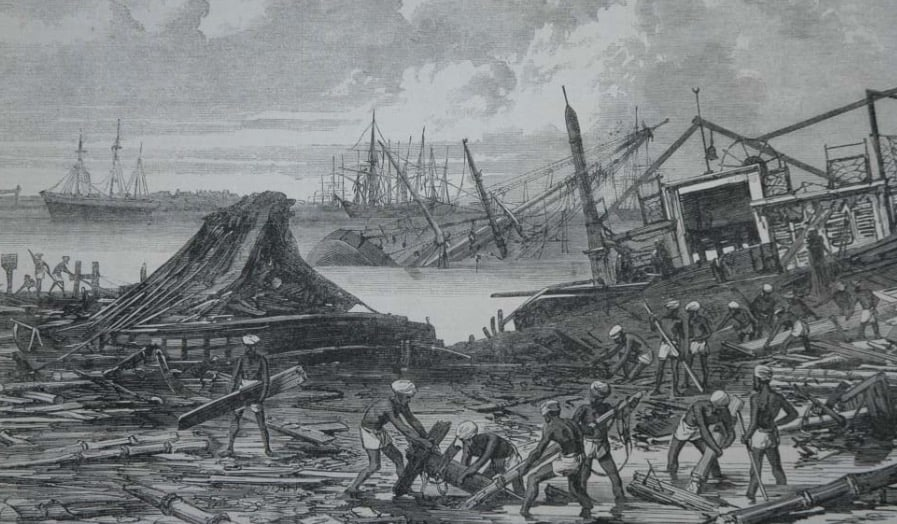
The wide swath of damages from the 1839 cyclone

Coringa is a harbour city situated on the Bay of Bengal, near the mouth of the Godavari River. The population of the area is ten million and the harbor is a busy place of commerce, with the said area hoisting thousands of international ships and cargoes.

In 1789, a different cyclone passed near the area, generating a large storm surge that killed over 20,000. Large ships sank in the rough waters off the Bay of Bengal and rice fields were destroyed by floods and wave surges. The city was almost wrecked, but managed to recover. After the city was rebuilt, the harbour became more active than it had been before. The cyclone is dubbed in modern times The Great Coringa cyclone.

Many ships passing through or near the port city started to observe a rainy pattern on 24 November 1839, a day before the cyclone made landfall. The stormy weather stopped on 26 November 1839, based on ship logs.

== Impact and aftermath ==
On 25 November 1839, the cyclone struck Coringa, generating a large 40-foot storm surge that completely destroyed the area. In comparison to the 1789 storm, the damages were much worse. All 200,000 ships in the harbour were destroyed and houses were washed away. Trees were washed away and other structures in the city sustained damage. Cropland and sugarcane reaps flooded. The storm killed an estimated 300,000 individuals inland and at sea, making it the second-deadliest tropical cyclone worldwide, behind the 1970 Bhola cyclone. Only a few people survived the brunt of the cyclone, however. Cattle and some animals inland drowned in the storm surge.

After the disaster, the survivors made no effort to rebuild the port. Most of them decided to migrate, staying away from the "cursed city". Some individuals left the coast to reconstruct their community, far inland. The region was dubbed Hope Island (Note: Different from Hope Island, which is located near Kakinada, Andhra Pradesh.) by British officials.

An official of the British East India Company, Henry Piddington, coined the term cyclone in his reports for the first time while observing the swath of destruction made by the 1789 and 1839 storms. The word itself means the coil of a snake.

== See also ==
- 1737 Calcutta cyclone – a cyclone that caused a wide swath of destruction to Calcutta during the 18th century.
- 1864 Calcutta cyclone – another cyclone that devastated Calcutta during the 19th century.
