= List of deadliest tropical cyclones =

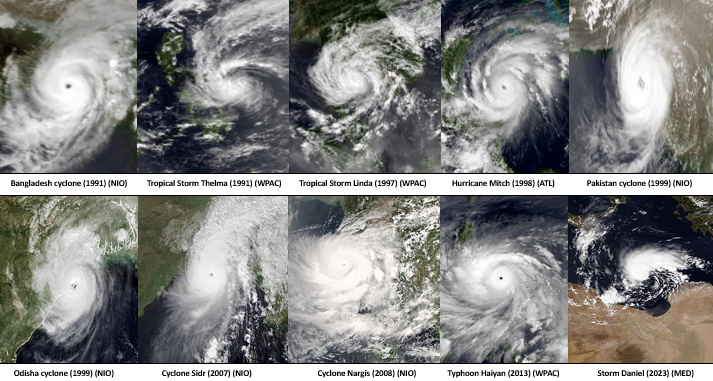
A collage of the ten deadliest tropical cyclones worldwide since 1990

This is a list of the deadliest tropical cyclones, including all known storms that caused at least 1,000 direct deaths. There were at least 76 tropical cyclones in the 20th century with a death toll of 1,000 or more, including the deadliest tropical cyclone in recorded history. In November 1970, the Bhola cyclone struck what is now Bangladesh and killed at least 300,000 people. There have been 16 tropical cyclones in the 21st century so far with a death toll of at least 1,000, of which the deadliest was Cyclone Nargis, with at least 138,374 deaths when it struck Myanmar. In recent years, the deadliest Atlantic hurricane was Hurricane Mitch of 1998, with at least 11,374 deaths attributed to it, while the deadliest Atlantic hurricane overall was the Great Hurricane of 1780, which resulted in at least 22,000 to 30,000 fatalities. The most recent tropical cyclone with at least 1,000 fatalities was Cyclone Senyar in 2025, which killed at least 1,501 people.

== 19th century and earlier ==
Name	Dates active	Basin	Areas affected	Deaths	Refs
? Unnamed	957	Western Pacific	China	10,000	
? Unnamed	1245	Western Pacific	China	10,000	
? Unnamed	1582	North Indian Ocean	Bangladesh	200,000	
? Unnamed	1601	North Atlantic	Veracruz, Mexico	1,000	
? Unnamed	1605	North Atlantic	Nicaragua	1,300	
? Unnamed	October 10, 1617	Western Pacific	Philippines	1,000	
? Unnamed	September 5, 1622	North Atlantic	Straits of Florida	1,090	
? Unnamed	October 1644	North Atlantic	Cuba, Florida	1,500	
? Unnamed	August 14–15, 1666	North Atlantic	Martinique and Guadeloupe	2,000	
? Unnamed	November 10, 1681	North Indian Ocean	India	14,000	
? Unnamed	September 27, 1694	North Atlantic	Florida, Newfoundland	1,000+	
? Unnamed	1699	North Indian Ocean	Bangladesh	50,000	
? Unnamed	July 31, 1715	North Atlantic	Bahamas, Florida Treasure Coast	1,000–2,500	
5 "Calcutta"	October 7, 1737	North Indian Ocean	India, Bangladesh	300,000	
? Unnamed	December 30, 1760	North Indian Ocean	India	1,100	
? Unnamed	1767	North Indian Ocean	Bangladesh	50,000	
? Unnamed	August 5–7, 1767	North Atlantic	Martinique	1,600	
? Unnamed	October 15, 1768	North Atlantic	Cuba	43–1,000	
? "Newfoundland"	August 29 – September 9, 1775	North Atlantic	North Carolina, Virginia, and Newfoundland	4,000 – 4,163	
? "Pointe-à-Pitre Bay"	September 5–12, 1776	North Atlantic	Lesser Antilles and Louisiana	6,000+	
? Unnamed	October 13, 1779	North Indian Ocean	India	20,000	
? "San Antonio"	June 12–13, 1780	North Atlantic	St. Lucia, Puerto Rico, and Dominican Republic	4,000–5,000	
? Unnamed	July 1780	Western Pacific	China	100,000	
? "Savanna-la-Mar"	October 1–5, 1780	North Atlantic	Jamaica, Cuba, and Bahamas	1,115	
? "Great Hurricane"	October 9–20, 1780	North Atlantic	Lesser Antilles, Puerto Rico, Hispaniola, and Bermuda	22,000–27,501	
? "Solano's"	October 18–21, 1780	North Atlantic	Gulf of Mexico	2,000	
? Unnamed	1781	North Atlantic	Offshore Florida	2,000+	
? "Central Atlantic"	September 16, 1782	North Atlantic	destroyed Admiral Thomas Graves fleet	3,000+	
? Unnamed	May 29, 1787	North Indian Ocean	India	20,000	
? Unnamed	December 1789	North Indian Ocean	India	20,000	
? "Great Cuba"	June 21–22, 1791	North Atlantic	Cuba	3,000	
? "Martinique and Dominica"	August 25, 1813	North Atlantic	Lesser Antilles	3,000+	
? Unnamed	May 1822	North Indian Ocean	Bangladesh	50,000	
? "Santa Ana"	July 26–27, 1825	North Atlantic	Lesser Antilles (especially Guadeloupe), Puerto Rico, Turks and Caicos Islands, Bermuda	1,300+	
? "Caribbean-Louisiana"	August 10–17, 1831	North Atlantic	Barbados, St. Vincent, Haiti, Cuba Louisiana	2,500	
? Unnamed	October 31, 1831	North Indian Ocean	Bangladesh	22,000	
? Unnamed	May 21, 1833	North Indian Ocean	India	50,000	
? Unnamed	November 16, 1839	North Indian Ocean	India	20,000	
? Unnamed	1847	North Indian Ocean	Bangladesh	75,000	
? Unnamed	October 1854	North Indian Ocean	India	50,000	
? Unnamed	1862	Western Pacific	China	80,000	
? Unnamed	October 5, 1864	North Indian Ocean	India	50,000	
? Unnamed	November 2, 1864	North Indian Ocean	India	40,000	
? "Angela"	September 20–26, 1867	Western Pacific	Philippines	1,800	
3 "Matanzas"	October 5–14, 1870	North Atlantic	Cuba, Florida, Bahamas	800–2,000	
? "Hong Kong"	September 22–23, 1874	Western Pacific	China	10,000	
4 "Backerganj"	October 29 – November 1, 1876	North Indian Ocean	Bangladesh	200,000	
? "Haiphong"	September 27 – October 8, 1881	Western Pacific	Philippines, Vietnam	3,000	
? Unnamed	September 22, 1885	North Indian Ocean	India	5,300	
3 "Mauritius"	April 20–25, 1892	South-West Indian Ocean	Mauritius	1,200	
3 "Sea Islands"	August 15 – September 2, 1893	North Atlantic	Georgia, South Carolina	1,000–2,000	
4 "Cheniere Caminada"	September 27 – October 5, 1893	North Atlantic	Yucatán Peninsula, Louisiana, Mississippi	1,800–2,000	
? Unnamed	September 15, 1894	Western Pacific	Philippines, China	2,000	
? Unnamed	September 1895	North Indian Ocean	India	5,000	
? Unnamed	1897	North Indian Ocean	Bangladesh	175,000	
? Unnamed	October 7, 1897	Western Pacific	Philippines	1,500	
4 "San Ciriaco"	August 3 – September 4, 1899	North Atlantic	Lesser Antilles, Puerto Rico, Eastern United States	3,855	
4 "Galveston"	August 27 – September 15, 1900	North Atlantic	The Caribbean, Texas	6,000–12,000	
? Unnamed	September 23–30, 1900	Western Pacific	Philippines, Vietnam	1,600	

== 20th century ==
Name	Dates active	Basin	Areas affected	Deaths	Refs
? "Hong Kong"	September 7–18, 1906	Western Pacific	China	15,000	
3 "Monterrey"	August 20–28, 1909	North Atlantic	Greater Antilles, Mexico	4,000	
? Unnamed	April 1911	North Indian Ocean	Bangladesh	120,000	
? "China"	August 1912	Western Pacific	China	50,000	
? Unnamed	September 1912	Western Pacific	Japan	1,000	
? Unnamed	May 1917	North Indian Ocean	Bangladesh	70,000	
? Unnamed	September 1919	Western Pacific	Japan	4,000	
? Unnamed	September 1919	North Indian Ocean	Bangladesh	40,000	
? "Shantou" ("Swatow")	July 27 – August 3, 1922	Western Pacific	China	50,000–100,000+	
? Unnamed	September 1923	Western Pacific	Japan	3,000	
? Unnamed	May 1926	North Indian Ocean	India	5,000	
? Unnamed	July 20–27, 1927	Western Pacific	China	10,000	
? Unnamed	August 19–30, 1927	Western Pacific	China	5,000	
? Unnamed	September 26, 1927	Western Pacific	China	5,000	
5 "Okeechobee"	September 6–20, 1928	North Atlantic	Lesser Antilles, Puerto Rico, Florida	4,075	
4 "San Zenon"	August 29 – September 17, 1930	North Atlantic	Lesser Antilles, Hispaniola	2,000–8,000	
? "Shanghai"	August 14–28, 1931	Western Pacific	China	300,000	
4 "British Honduras"	September 6–13, 1931	North Atlantic	British Honduras	1,500–2,500	
5 "Cuba"	October 30 – November 13, 1932	North Atlantic	Netherlands Antilles, Cuba, Bahamas	3,142	
2 "Central America"	June 4–18, 1934	North Atlantic	Central America, Eastern United States	2,000–3,000	
? "Muroto"	September 13–21, 1934	Western Pacific	Japan	3,066	
1 "Jérémie"	October 18–27, 1935	North Atlantic	Greater Antilles, Central America	2,150	
? Unnamed	August 28, 1936	Western Pacific	South Korea	1,104	
? "Hong Kong"	August 28 – September 4, 1937	Western Pacific	China	13,000	
? Unnamed	May 21–27, 1941	North Indian Ocean	Bangladesh	7,500	
? Unnamed	October 16, 1943	North Indian Ocean	India	15,000	
1 Ida	September 10–20, 1945	Western Pacific	Japan	2,473	
2 Kathleen	September 10–17, 1947	Western Pacific	Japan	1,077	
? Unnamed	May 17–19, 1948	North Indian Ocean	Bangladesh	1,200	
4 Trix	October 15–26, 1952	Western Pacific	Philippines, Vietnam	1,400	
1 Marie	September 19–28, 1954	Western Pacific	Japan	1,761	
5 Janet	September 21–30, 1955	North Atlantic	Barbados, Windward Islands, British Honduras, Yucatán Peninsula, Mainland Mexico	1,023	
5 Wanda	July 25 – August 5, 1956	Western Pacific	Taiwan, China	4,935	
5 Ida	September 20–27, 1958	Western Pacific	Japan	1,269	
? Unnamed	October 21–24, 1958	North Indian Ocean	Bangladesh	12,000	
5 Sarah	September 11–19, 1959	Western Pacific	Japan, South Korea	2,000	
5 Vera	September 20–27, 1959	Western Pacific	Japan	5,000	
4 "Mexico"	October 22–28, 1959	Eastern Pacific	Southwest Mexico	1,800	
1 Mary	June 2–12, 1960	Western Pacific	China	1,600	
2 Nine	October 5–12, 1960	North Indian Ocean	Bangladesh	6,000	
3 Ten	October 27 – November 1, 1960	North Indian Ocean	Bangladesh	8,149	
2 Three	May 5–9, 1961	North Indian Ocean	Bangladesh	11,468	
? Five	May 27–30, 1961	North Indian Ocean	Bangladesh	10,466	
1 Harriet	October 19–31, 1962	Western Pacific and North Indian Ocean	Bangladesh, Thailand	50,935	
1 Three	May 25–29, 1963	North Indian Ocean	Bangladesh	11,520	
4 Flora	September 26 – October 12, 1963	North Atlantic	The Caribbean, Florida	7,193	
5 "Rameswaram"	December 18–24, 1964	North Indian Ocean	Sri Lanka, India	1,800	
1 One	May 9–12, 1965	North Indian Ocean	Bangladesh	19,270	
1 Two	May 26 – June 1, 1965	North Indian Ocean	Bangladesh	12,000	
1 Thirteen	December 5–15, 1965	North Indian Ocean	Pakistan	10,000	
5 Inez	September 21 – October 11, 1966	North Atlantic	Lesser Antilles, Haiti, Cuba, Bahamas, Florida Keys, Yucatán, Mexico	1,000 – 1,269	
1 "Burma"	May 7–10, 1968	North Indian Ocean	Myanmar	1,037	
4 "Bhola"	November 3–13, 1970	North Indian Ocean	Bangladesh, India	≥300,000	
3 "Odisha"	October 27–31, 1971	North Indian Ocean	Bangladesh, India	11,000	
3 "Flores"	April 26–30, 1973	Australian	Indonesia	1,653	
2 Fifi	September 14–21, 1974	North Atlantic	Jamaica, Central America, Mexico	8,210	
4 Nina	July 30 – August 8, 1975	Western Pacific	China	26,000	
4 Liza	September 25 – October 2, 1976	Eastern Pacific	Mexico, Southwestern United States	1,263	
3 "Andhra Pradesh"	November 14–21, 1977	North Indian Ocean	India (especially Andhra Pradesh)	10,000	
2 "Sri Lanka"	November 17–29, 1978	North Indian Ocean	Sri Lanka, India	1,000	
5 David	August 25 – September 8, 1979	North Atlantic	The Caribbean, Eastern United States	2,068	
2 Paul	September 18–30, 1982	Eastern Pacific	Central America, Mexico	1,625	
4 Ike	August 26 – September 6, 1984	Western Pacific	Philippines, China	1,474	
4 Agnes	October 30 – November 9, 1984	Western Pacific	Philippines, Vietnam	1,029	
TS "Bangladesh"	May 22–25, 1985	North Indian Ocean	Bangladesh	11,069	
3 "Bangladesh"	November 21–30, 1988	North Indian Ocean	Bangladesh, India	6,240	
5 "Bangladesh"	April 24–30, 1991	North Indian Ocean	Bangladesh	138,000	
TS Thelma	November 1–8, 1991	Western Pacific	Philippines	5,081	
4 Fred	August 14–22, 1994	Western Pacific	Japan, Taiwan, China	1,248	
1 Gordon	November 8–21, 1994	North Atlantic	Central America, Greater Antilles, Florida	1,152	
4 "Andhra Pradesh"	November 4–7, 1996	North Indian Ocean	India	1,077	
TS Linda	October 31 – November 9, 1997	Western Pacific and North Indian Ocean	Philippines, Vietnam, Thailand	3,275	
3 "Gujarat"	June 4–10, 1998	North Indian Ocean	India	1,173	
5 Mitch	October 22 – November 5, 1998	North Atlantic	Central America, Yucatán Peninsula, South Florida	11,374	
3 "Pakistan"	May 16–22, 1999	North Indian Ocean	Pakistan	6,200	
5 "Odisha"	October 25 – November 4, 1999	North Indian Ocean	Bangladesh, India (especially Odisha), Myanmar	9,899	

== 21st century ==
Name	Dates active	Basin	Areas affected	Deaths	Refs
3 Jeanne	September 13–28, 2004	North Atlantic	The Caribbean, Eastern United States	3,037	
TD Winnie	November 29–30, 2004	Western Pacific	Philippines	1,593	
5 Katrina	August 23–30, 2005	North Atlantic	Bahamas, United States Gulf Coast	1,392	
1 Stan	October 1–5, 2005	North Atlantic	Mexico, Central America	1,668	
4 Durian	November 25 – December 6, 2006	Western Pacific	Philippines, Vietnam	1,500	
5 Sidr	November 11–16, 2007	North Indian Ocean	Bangladesh	3,447	
4 Nargis	April 27 – May 3, 2008	North Indian Ocean	Myanmar	138,373	
3 Fengshen	June 17–27, 2008	Western Pacific	Philippines, China	1,371	
TS Washi	December 13–19, 2011	Western Pacific	Philippines	1,257	
5 Bopha	November 25 - December 9, 2012	Western Pacific	Philippines	1,901	
5 Haiyan	November 3–11, 2013	Western Pacific	Philippines	6,352	
5 Maria	September 16 – October 2, 2017	North Atlantic	Lesser Antilles (particularly Dominica), Puerto Rico	3,059	
4 Idai	March 4–21, 2019	South-West Indian Ocean	Mozambique, Malawi, Madagascar, Zimbabwe	1,593	
5 Freddy	February 4–March 14, 2023	South-West Indian Ocean	Mozambique, Malawi, Madagascar, Zimbabwe	1,434	
TS Daniel	September 4–12, 2023	Mediterranean	Libya, Egypt, Turkey, Greece, Bulgaria, Israel	5,951	
TS Senyar	November 25–30, 2025	North Indian Ocean and Western Pacific	Thailand, Malaysia, Indonesia	1,501+	
(Note: Reference for dates for Atlantic hurricanes.)

== See also ==
- Effects of tropical cyclones#Deaths
- List of the costliest tropical cyclones
- List of the most intense tropical cyclones
- List of natural disasters by death toll
