= Pre-1890 North Indian Ocean cyclone seasons =

The years before 1890 featured the pre-1890 North Indian Ocean cyclone seasons. Each season was an event in the annual cycle of tropical cyclone formation. The North Indian tropical cyclone season has no bounds, but they tend to form between April and December, peaks in May and November. These dates conventionally delimit the period of each year when most tropical cyclones form in the northern Indian Ocean. Below are the most significant cyclones in the time period. Because much of the North Indian coastline is near sea level and prone to flooding, these cyclones can easily kill many with storm surge and flooding. These cyclones are among the deadliest on earth in terms of numbers killed.

== Before 18th century ==
- 1000 – A cyclone with hurricane force winds struck North Cinque Island of Andaman Islands.
- 1480 – A cyclone deepened the channels of Rama's Bridge, making it no longer possible to walk from India to Sri Lanka.
- 1484 – A cyclone struck the Chittagong Coast of Bangladesh with hurricane force winds, killing 200,000 (Indian system 2,00,000) people. (Note: A 2014 study considers this reported round figure to be unrealistic.)
- 6 May 1558 – A tropical cyclone struck the Sundarbans. The storm lasted for five hours, killing 500,000 people.
- 1582 – A tropical cyclone impacted the Sundarbans and West Bengal which killed 200,000 people. The severity lasted about five-hours, with the associated winds and thunderstorm destroying houses and boats along the coast near Bakerganj (presently in Barisal and Patuakhali). Only Hindu temples with a strong foundation were spared.
- 15 May 1618 – A tropical cyclone impacted Bombay and was described as "disastrous". A Jesuit historian who witnessed the event described the activities of thunderstorms and whirlwind has raised waves so high. This disaster was accompanied with Mumbai earthquake, which resulted in 2,000 deaths.
- 1669 – A tropical cyclone caused heavy damage in the coastal areas of the Sundarbans.
- 10 November 1681 – A tropical cyclone affected Nagapattinam and many small vessels were lost. 14,000 people died in the storm.
- 12 October 1688 – A tropical cyclone impacted the Sundarbans, killing 60,000 people in Sagar Island.
- September 1698 – A tropical cyclone struck Bombay.
- 1699 – A tropical cyclone impacted the Sundarbans, killing 60,000 people.

== 18th century ==
- 18 April 1700 – A tropical cyclone made landfall in Andhra Pradesh, sinking vessels near the coast. One ship bound for Bengal was driven ashore.
- 30 November 1702 – A tropical cyclone struck Bombay and destroyed all the small boats of the island, and the mango, jack and palm trees were blown down. The wind destroyed almost the whole produce of the island and wrecked the greater part of the shipping. The cyclone was preceded with a plague outbreak.
- December 1706 – A tropical cyclone made landfall in Andhra Pradesh, killing many people in Kottapalam and the surrounding area.
- 17 September 1707 – A tropical cyclone and an accompanying flood left 9,000 people homeless in the Sundarbans.
- 18 December 1709 – A tropical cyclone struck Tamil Nadu. A large wave caused coastal inundation.
- 13–14 November 1721 – A tropical cyclone impacted Madras.
- 7–12 October 1737 – The first super cyclonic storm ever recorded in the North Indian Ocean hit Calcutta on 11th October 1737, killing 3,000.
- 3 November 1737 – A tropical cyclone coincided with an earthquake and killed 317 people in the Sundarbans.
- 9 November 1740 - A tropical cyclone impacted Bombay.
- 11 September 1742 – A tropical cyclone struck Bombay forcing all the ships at harbour from their anchors. Royal ships called Somerset and Salisbury, were damaged in the tempest. The storm bought great devastation and was described as "The Records state that the gale was so excessive, 'as has not been exceeded in the memory of any one now on the spot'".
- 2 October 1747 – A tropical cyclone crossed the coast near Chennai.
- 31 October 1752 – A strong tropical cyclone affected Chennai and caused heavy rain lasting several days.
- 1760 – A tropical cyclone struck Khulna, devastating the coasts of western Bangladesh.
- 30 December 1760 – A tropical cyclone struck Pondicherry, killing somewhere between 200–11,000 people.
- 7 March 1762 – A tropical cyclone struck Bombay.
- 2 April 1762 – A tropical cyclone coincided with an earthquake and killed 14 people in the Sundarbans.
- 1763 – A tropical cyclone struck Noakhali, washing away people, houses, and cattle.
- 21 October 1763 – A tropical cyclone crossed the coast near Chennai.
- 1765 – A tropical cyclone devastated coastal Chittagong.
- 1767 - A tropical cyclone moved ashore modern-day Bangladesh near Bakerganj. 30,000 people died in the storm.
- 1776 – A tropical cyclone affected Chittagong.
- 13 October 1779 – A tropical cyclone struck Masulipatam and killed 20,000.
- 20 May 1787 – A tropical cyclone struck Coringa (present-day Kakinada) and killed 20,000. Coastal inundation was worsened by tidal flooding.
- December 1789 – A tropical cyclone impacted Coringa, India and killed 20,000.
- 1789 – A tropical cyclone affected Bangladesh, killing 20,000.
- November 1799 – A tropical cyclone passed over Bombay.

== Early 19th century ==
- 1807 – A tropical cyclone impacted West Bengal and killed 90,000 people.
- 7 May 1810 – A tropical cyclone affected the entire Bengal region, killing 1,025 people.
- 1822 - A cyclone struck Bangladesh and killed 40,000 people.
- 1831 – An intense tropical cyclone impacted Odisha.
- October 31, 1831 - A severe cyclonic storm moved ashore Barisal in Bangladesh with a storm surge of 2.12 m (7.0 ft), killing 22,000 people and over 50,000 cattle.
- 21 May 1833 – A tropical cyclone impacted West Bengal and killed around 50,000 people, with a record low of 890.6 millibars in North Indian Ocean, lowest over Indian Ocean.
- 15 June 1837 - A cyclone struck Mumbai that destroyed 400 houses.
- 11 November 1842 – A tropical cyclone struck the Sundarbans, killing 171 cattle.
- 1847 – A tropical cyclone impacted Bengal where it caused 75,000 human deaths and killed 6000 cattle.

=== 1839 India cyclone ===
A tropical cyclone impacted Andhra Pradesh, India, on 25 November 1839 and killed around 300,000 people.

== Late 19th century ==
- 5 May 1852 – A tropical cyclone struck the Sundarbans, killing 171 people and some wildlife.
- 1854 - A tropical cyclone struck Bombay causing considerable damage.
- 14 May 1862 – A tropical cyclone killed 3,064 animals in the Sundarbans.
- 1 November 1867 – A tropical cyclone impacted the Sundarbans, destroying crops.
- 16 May 1869 – A tropical cyclone killed 142 wild animals in the Sundarbans.
- 28 November 1871 – A tropical cyclone and an accompanying flood left 6,000 people homeless in the Sundarbans.
- 6 May 1882 – A tropical cyclone and an accompanying flood impacted the Sundarbans, causing 938 people to go missing.

=== 1864 Calcutta cyclone ===
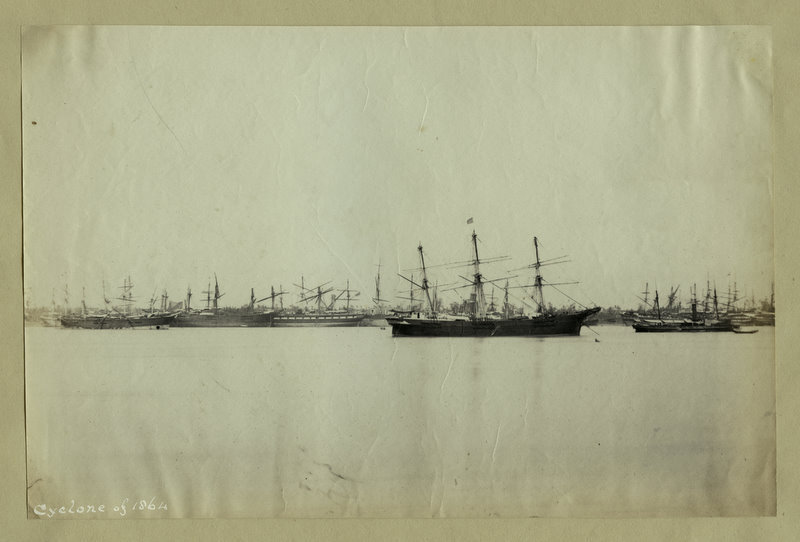
The 1864 Calcutta cyclone

On 5 October a powerful cyclone hit near Calcutta, India, killing around 300,100 people. The anemometer in the city was blown away during the cyclone. Over 100 brick homes and tens of thousands of tiled and straw huts were leveled. Most ships in the harbor (172 out of 195) were either damaged or destroyed. The cyclone of 1864 destroyed the ports at Khejuri and Hijli.

=== November 1867 Great Calcutta cyclone ===
The anemometer in the city was blown away during the cyclone. A lack of storm surge minimized the overall damage from this system.

=== October 1874 Bengal cyclone ===
This severe cyclone killed 80,000 people and caused significant damage.

=== October 1876 Backerganj cyclone ===
On 31 October a super cyclone with winds estimated to 220 kmph(140mph) on 3 minutes or 230kmph(145kmph) on 1 minute with an estimated pressure of 945hpa hit the Meghna River Delta area of India. The storm surge killed 100,000, and the disease after the storm killed another 100,000.

=== 1877 season ===
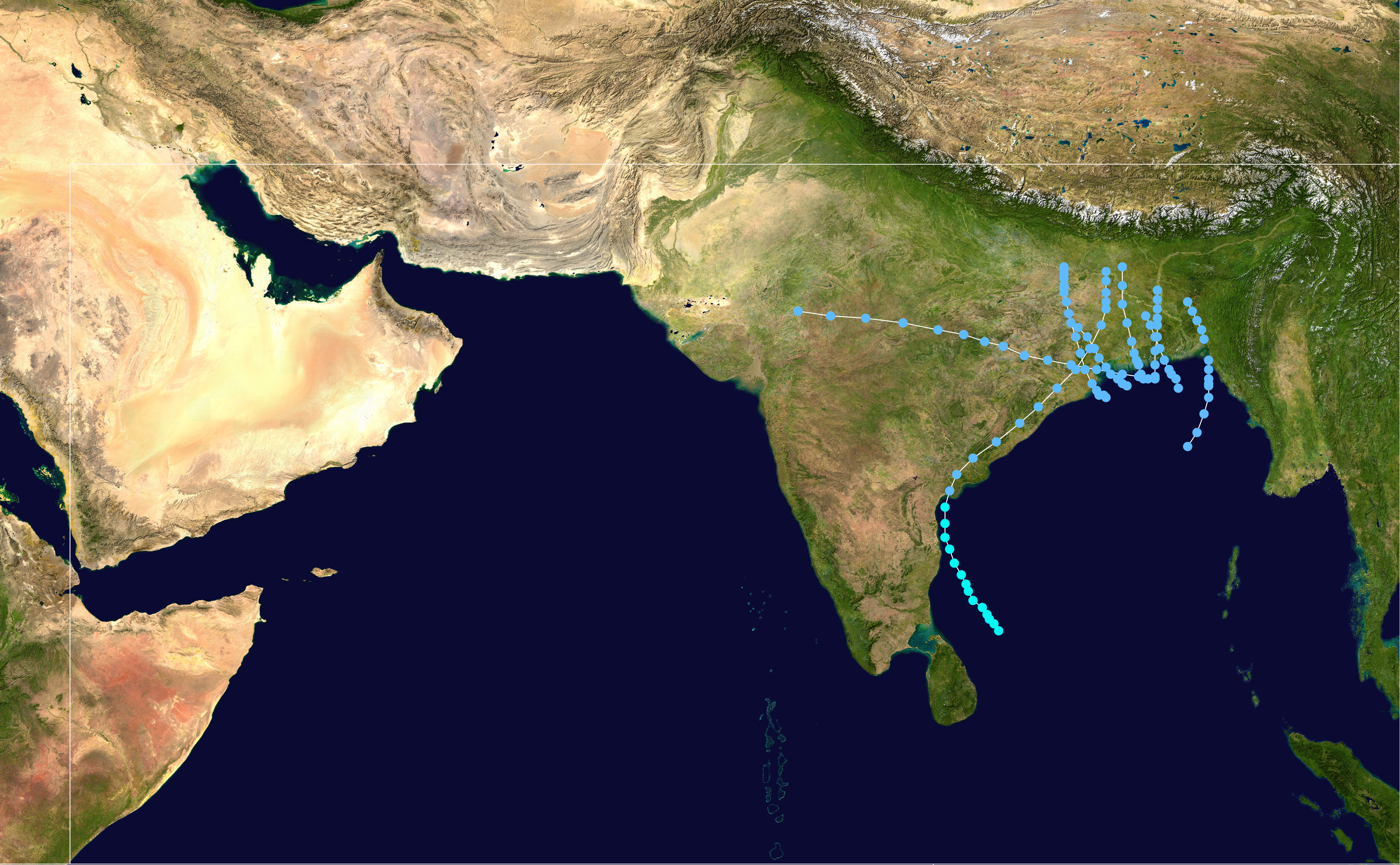
Season summary

=== 1878 season ===
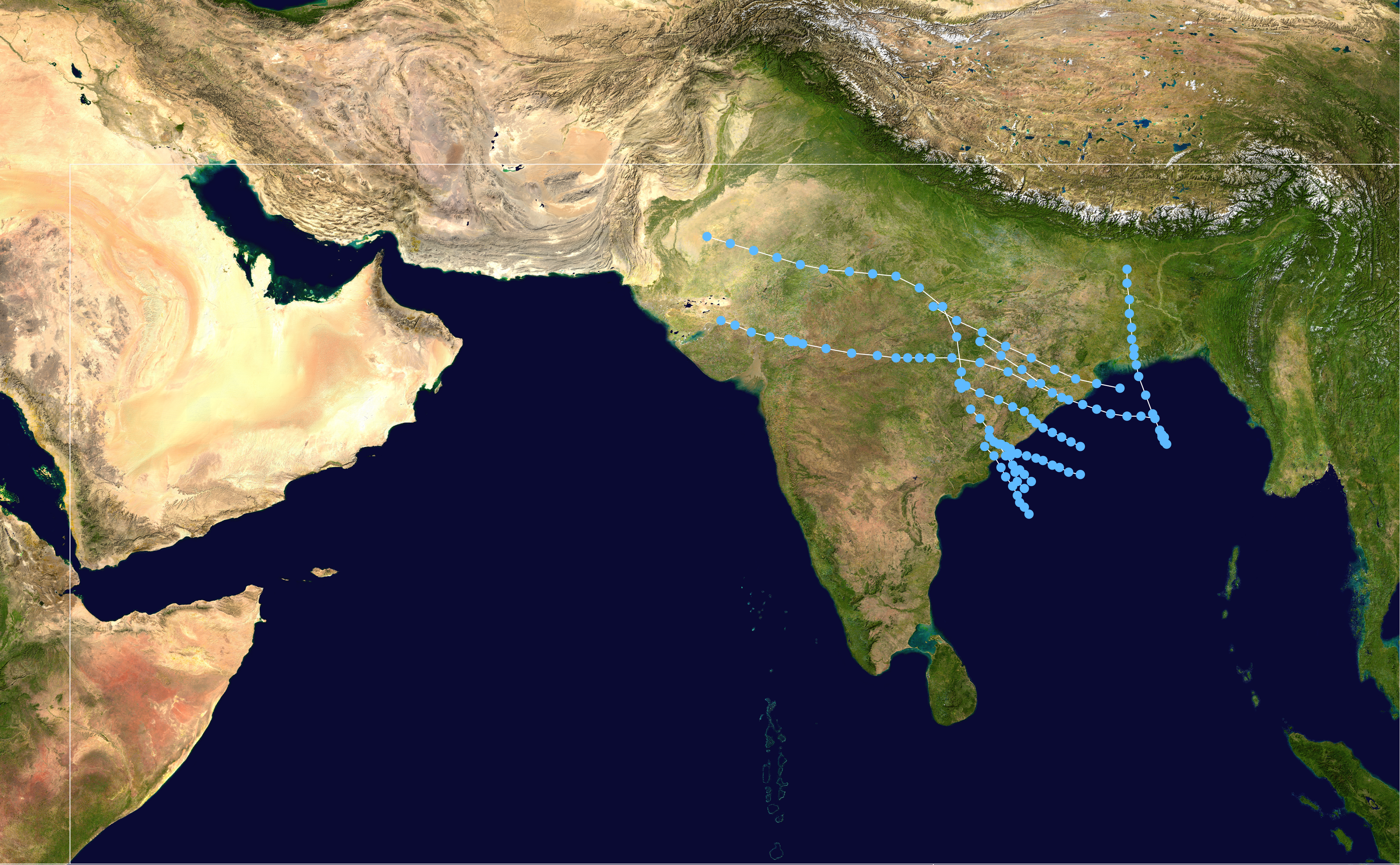
Season summary

=== 1879 season ===
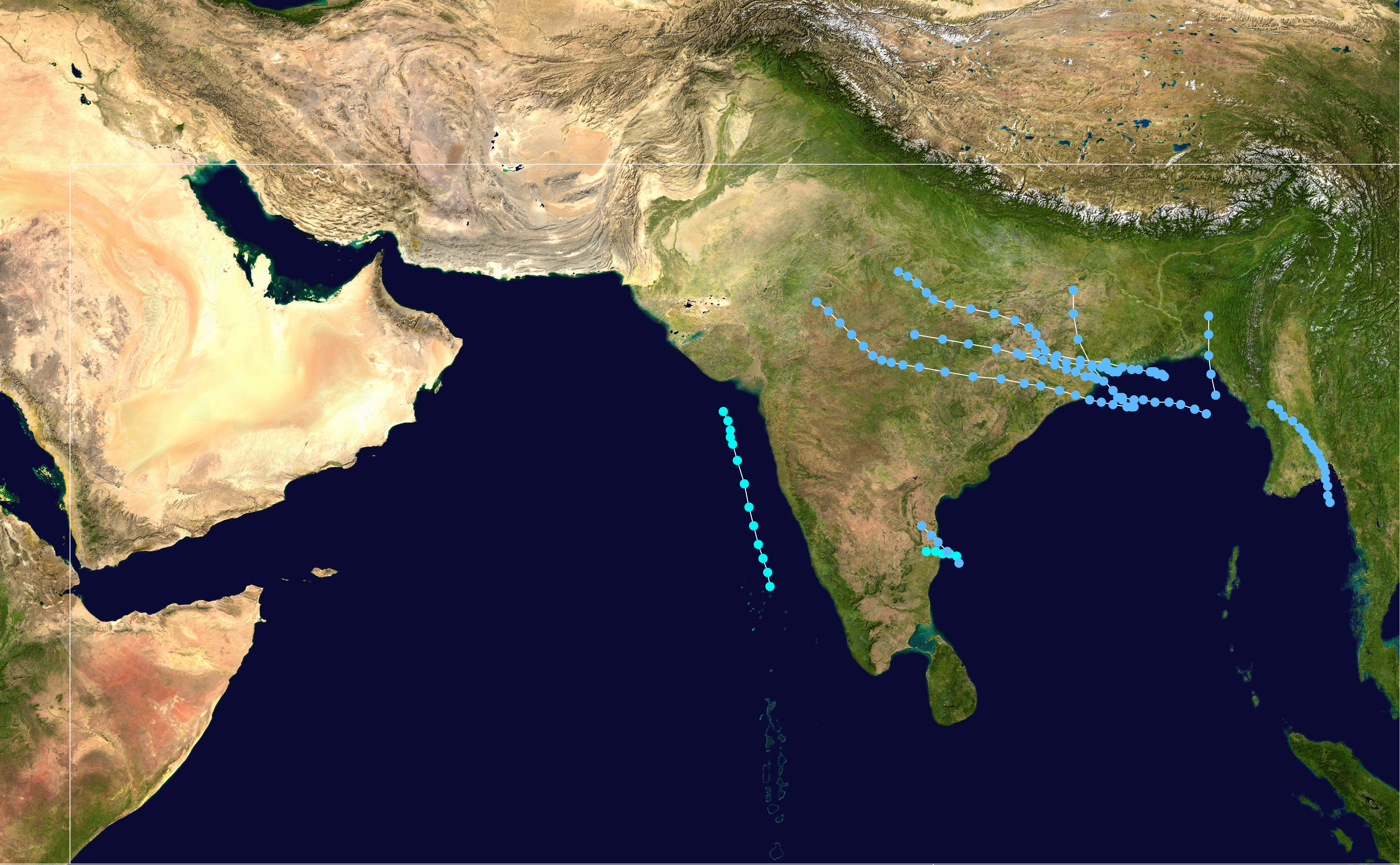
Season summary

=== 1880 season ===
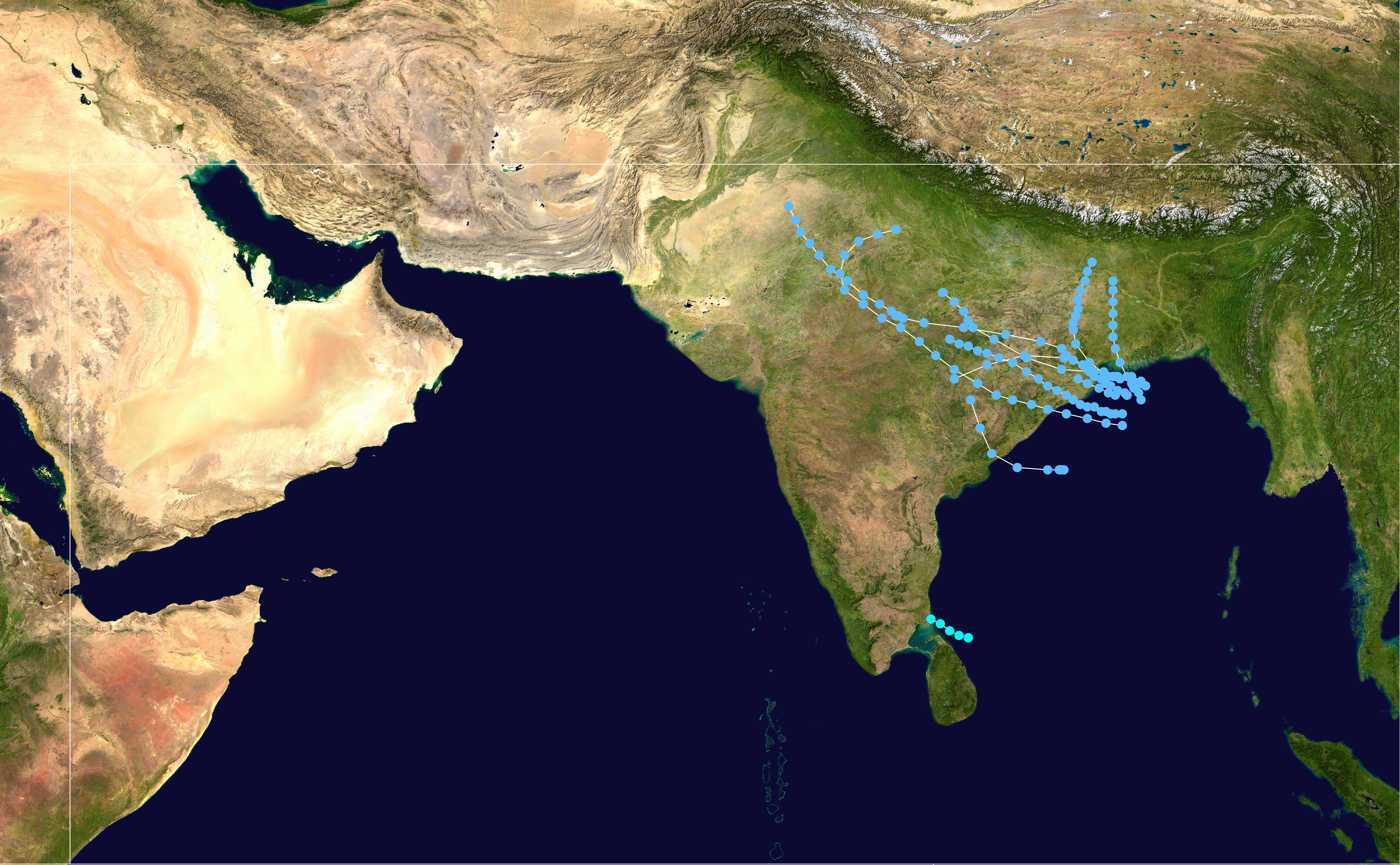
Season summary

=== June 1885 Aden cyclone ===
A cyclone had formed near the Laccadive Islands on 24 May 555 kilometres (345 mi) west of southern India. The SS Mergui encountered the cyclone off the Horn of Africa, 400 kilometres (250 mi) east of Socotra on 1 June and reported it stronger than the tropical cyclone which struck Calcutta in 1864. Just before midnight on the night of 1 June the Diomed reported winds of hurricane force and a pressure of 984 millibars (29.1 inHg). The ship Peshawar reported a westerly hurricane at the east end of the Gulf of Aden towards midnight on the night of 2 June. At noon on 3 June the Tantallon reported a pressure of 943 millibars (27.8 inHg) near 12.5N 45.5E. On 3 June the German corvette Augusta, the French dispatch boat Renard, and the British ship SS Speke Hall were lost in the storm in the Gulf of Aden. The system continued westward and shrank in as it moved into the entrance of the Red Sea, crossing the coast of Djibouti. It became the first north Indian ocean tropical cyclone in history to transit the Gulf of Aden with full hurricane intensity and held the record of westernmost landfalling North Indian Ocean tropical cyclone ever.

=== 1885 Odisha cyclone ===
An intense cyclone struck Odisha. It killed one person.

=== 1888 Gujarat cyclone ===
In November a cyclonic storm with hurricane-force winds struck Gujarat causing a ship SS Vaitarna to loss at sea, presumably sunk, killing more than 740 people.

== See also ==
- List of tropical cyclones in Pakistan
- Tropical cyclones in India
- List of Australian region cyclones before 1900
- Pre-1900 South Pacific cyclone seasons
- List of South-West Indian Ocean cyclones before 1900
