= 1965 North Indian Ocean cyclone season =

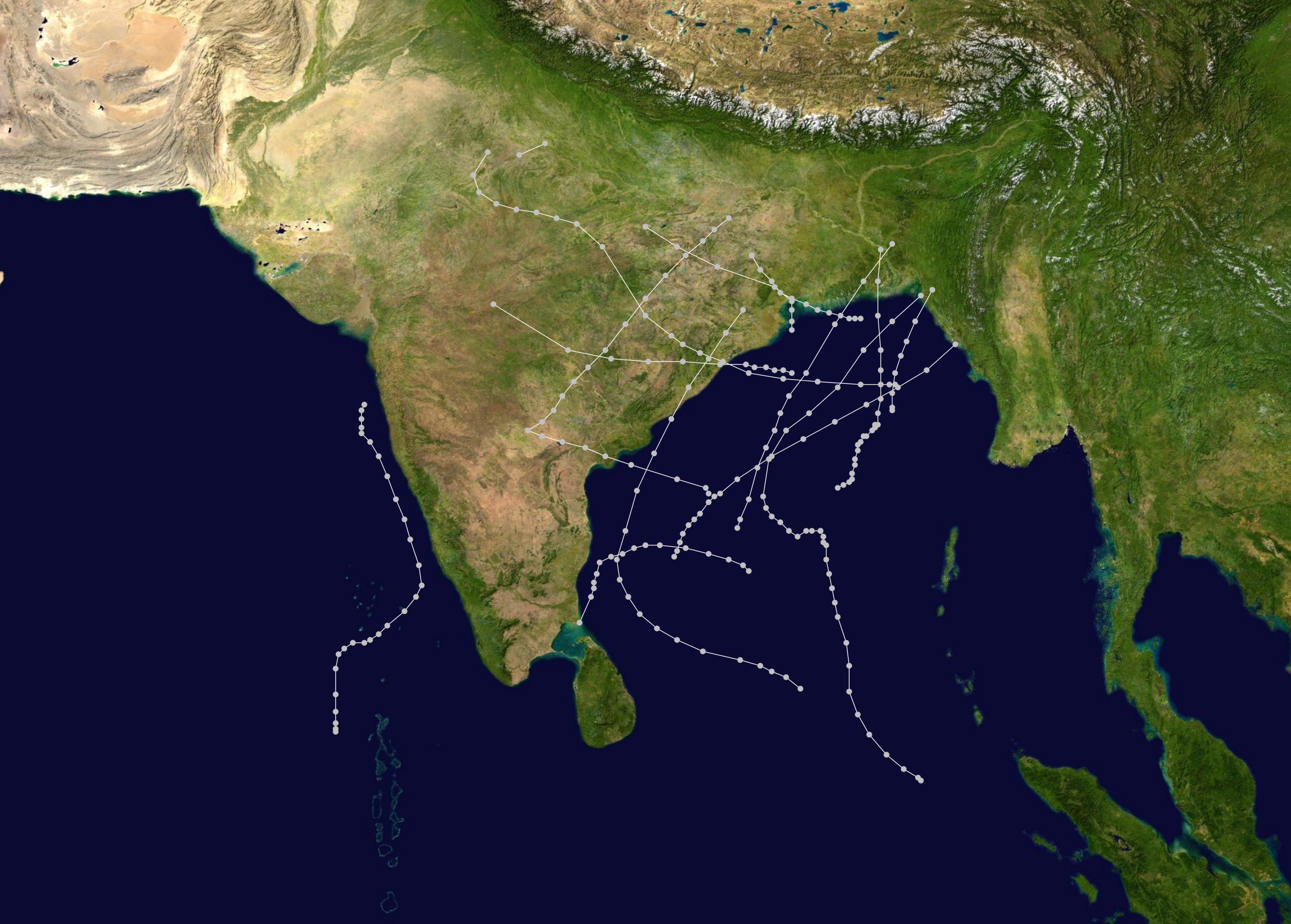
- Season summary map

Seasonal boundaries
- First system formed: May 9, 1965
- Last system dissipated: January 4, 1966

Seasonal statistics
- Depressions: 14
- Cyclonic storms: 6
- Severe cyclonic storms: 4
- Total fatalities: Unknown
- Total damage: Unknown

Related articles
- 1965 Atlantic hurricane season; 1965 Pacific hurricane season; 1965 Pacific typhoon season

The 1965 North Indian Ocean cyclone season had no bounds, but cyclones tend to form between April and December, with peaks in May and November. The season has no official bounds but cyclones tend to form between April and December. These dates conventionally delimit the period of each year when most tropical cyclones form in the northern Indian Ocean. There are two main seas in the North Indian Ocean—the Bay of Bengal to the east of the Indian subcontinent and the Arabian Sea to the west of India. The official Regional Specialized Meteorological Centre in this basin is the India Meteorological Department (IMD), while the Joint Typhoon Warning Center releases unofficial advisories. An average of four to six storms form in the North Indian Ocean every season with peaks in May and November. Cyclones occurring between the meridians 45°E and 100°E are included in the season by the IMD.

== Systems ==
=== Cyclone One (01B) ===
- Category 1 tropical cyclone (SSHWS)
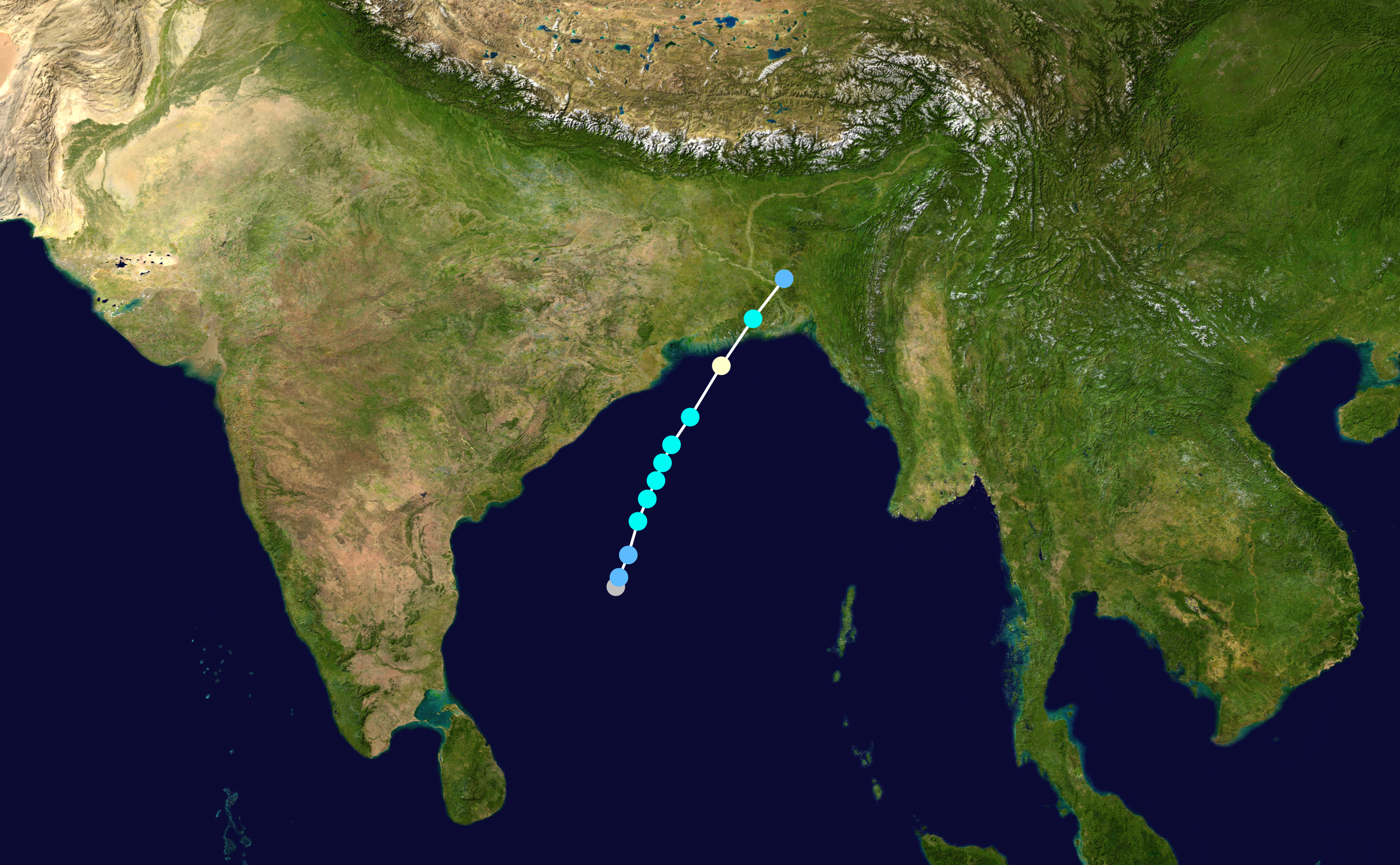
- Duration: May 9 – May 12
- Peak intensity: 120 km/h (75 mph) (1-min);

Two cyclones that hit on May 11 and June 1 killed a total of 47,000 people.

=== Cyclone Two (02B) ===
- Category 1 tropical cyclone (SSHWS)
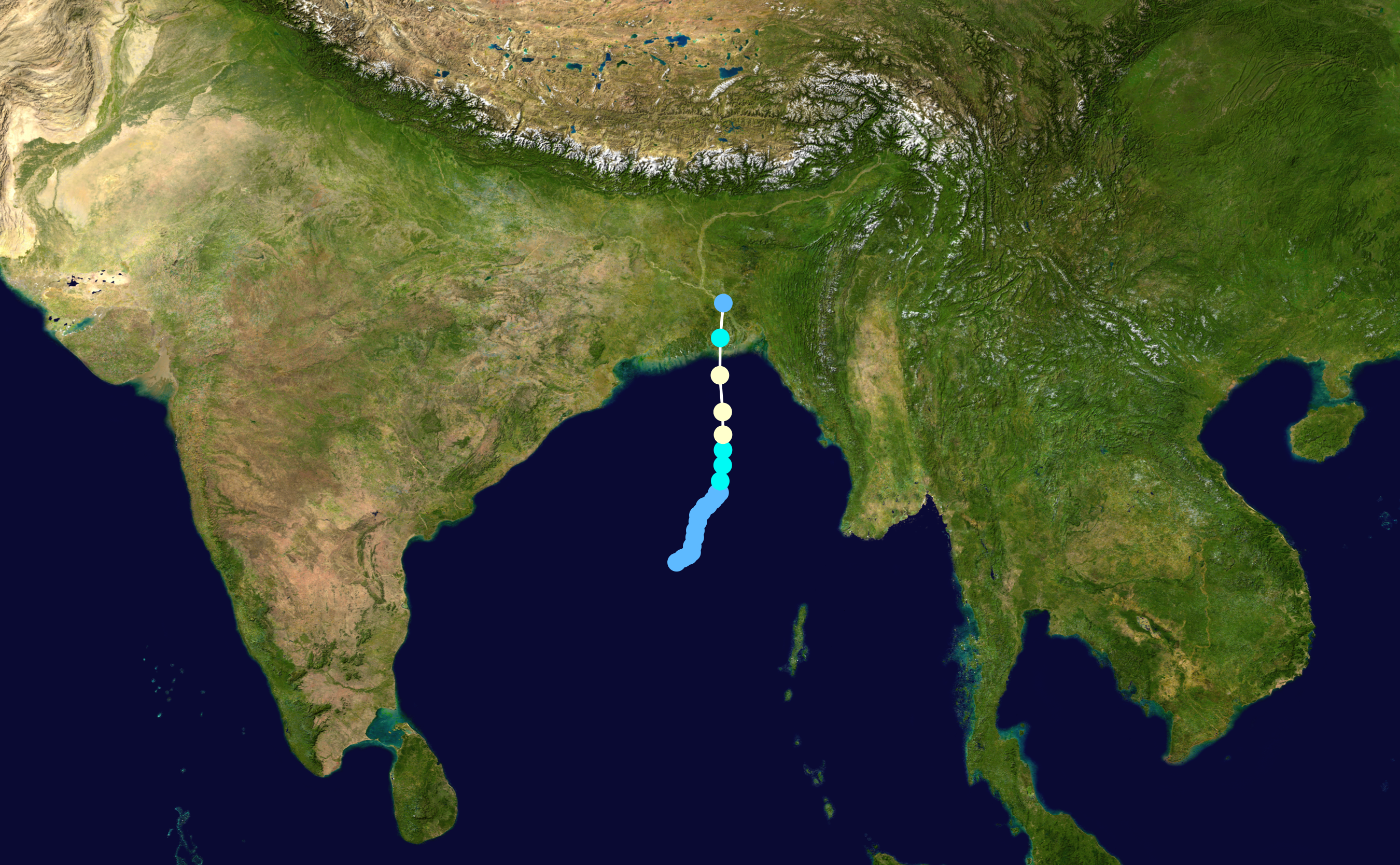
- Duration: May 26 – June 1
- Peak intensity: 120 km/h (75 mph) (1-min);

Two cyclones that hit on May 11 and June 1 killed a total of 47,000 people.

=== Depression Three (03B) ===
- Tropical depression (SSHWS)
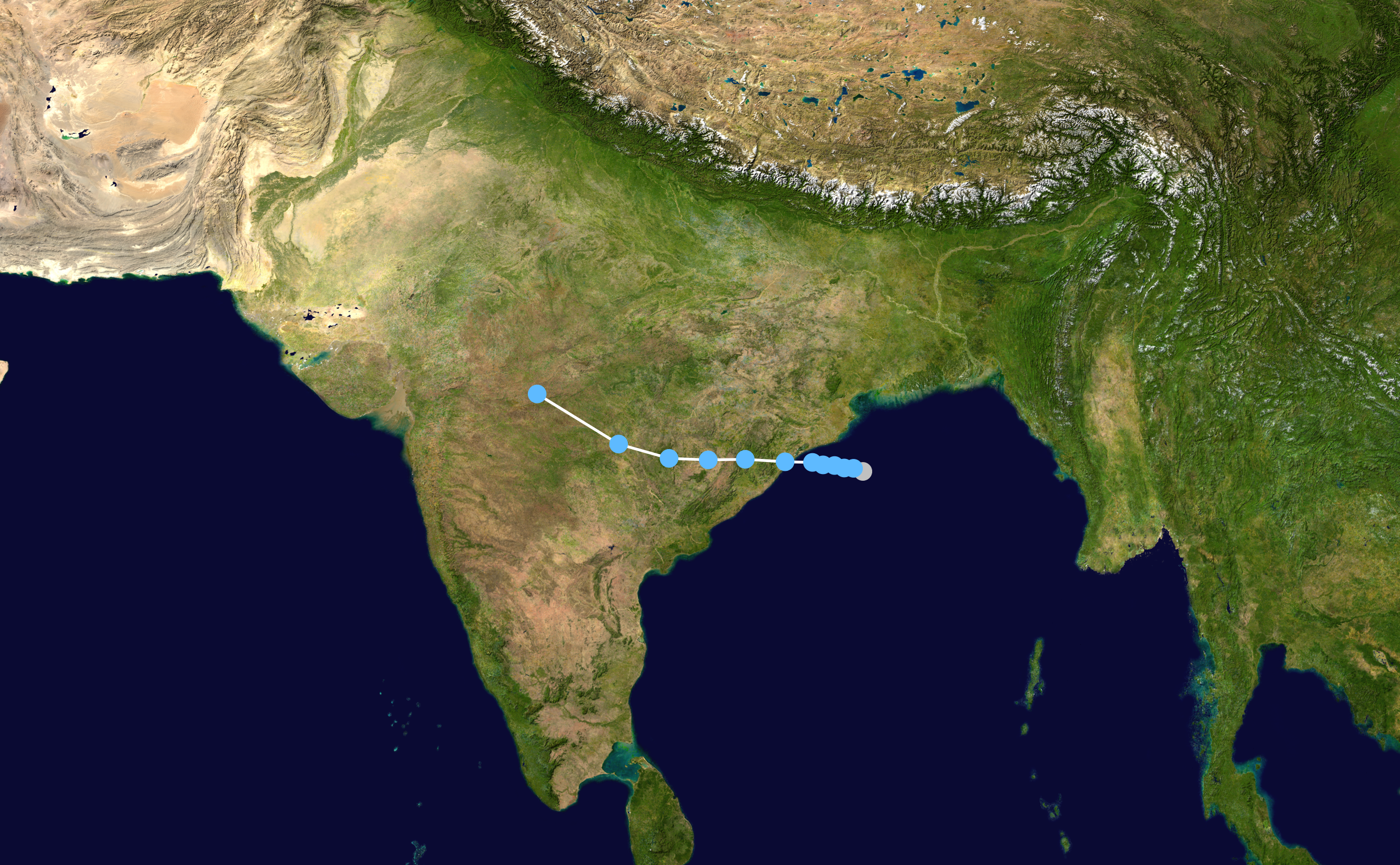
- Duration: July 12 – July 15
- Peak intensity: 45 km/h (30 mph) (1-min);

=== Depression Four (04B) ===
- Tropical depression (SSHWS)
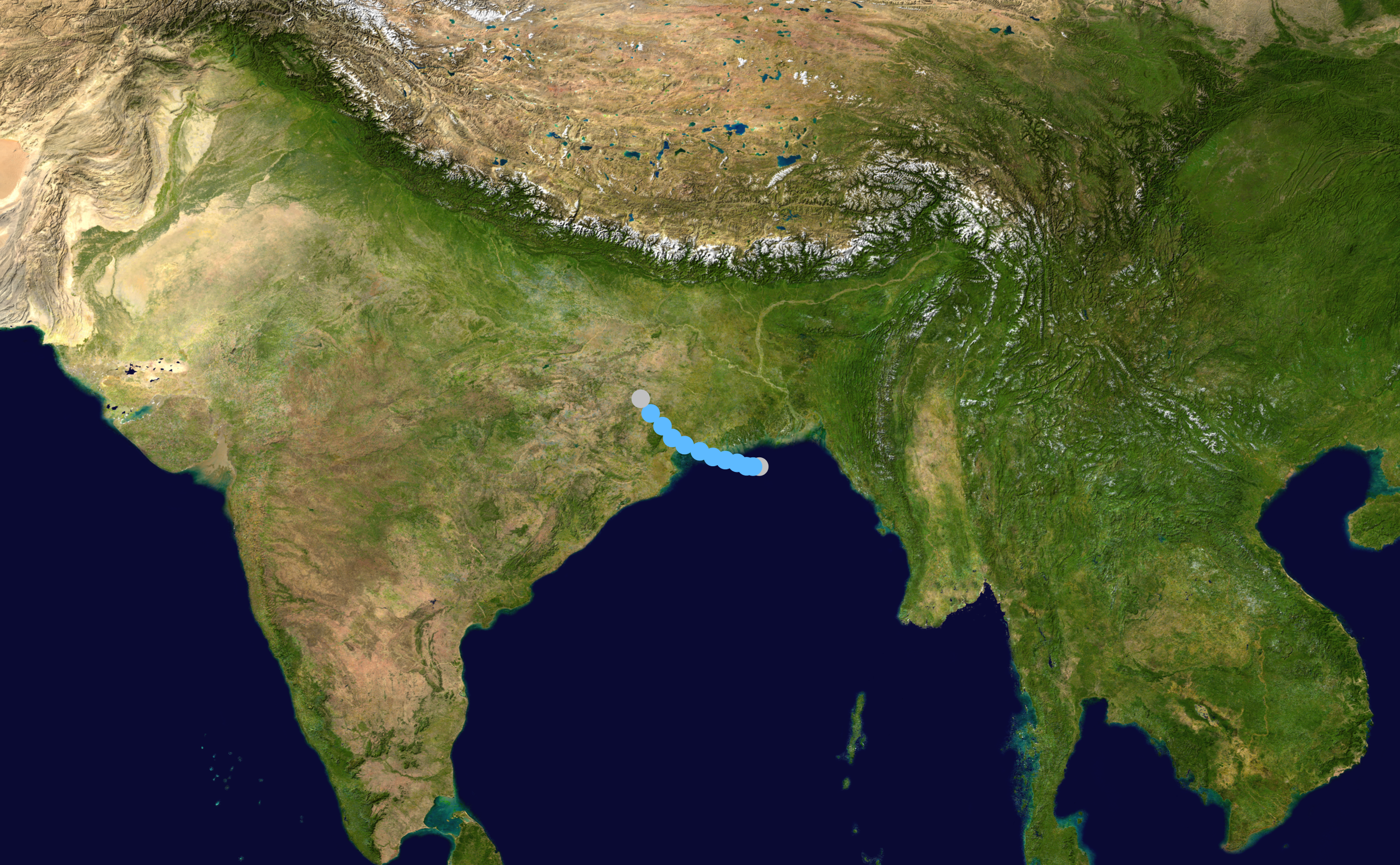
- Duration: July 25 – July 28
- Peak intensity: 45 km/h (30 mph) (1-min);

=== Depression Five ===
- Depression (IMD)
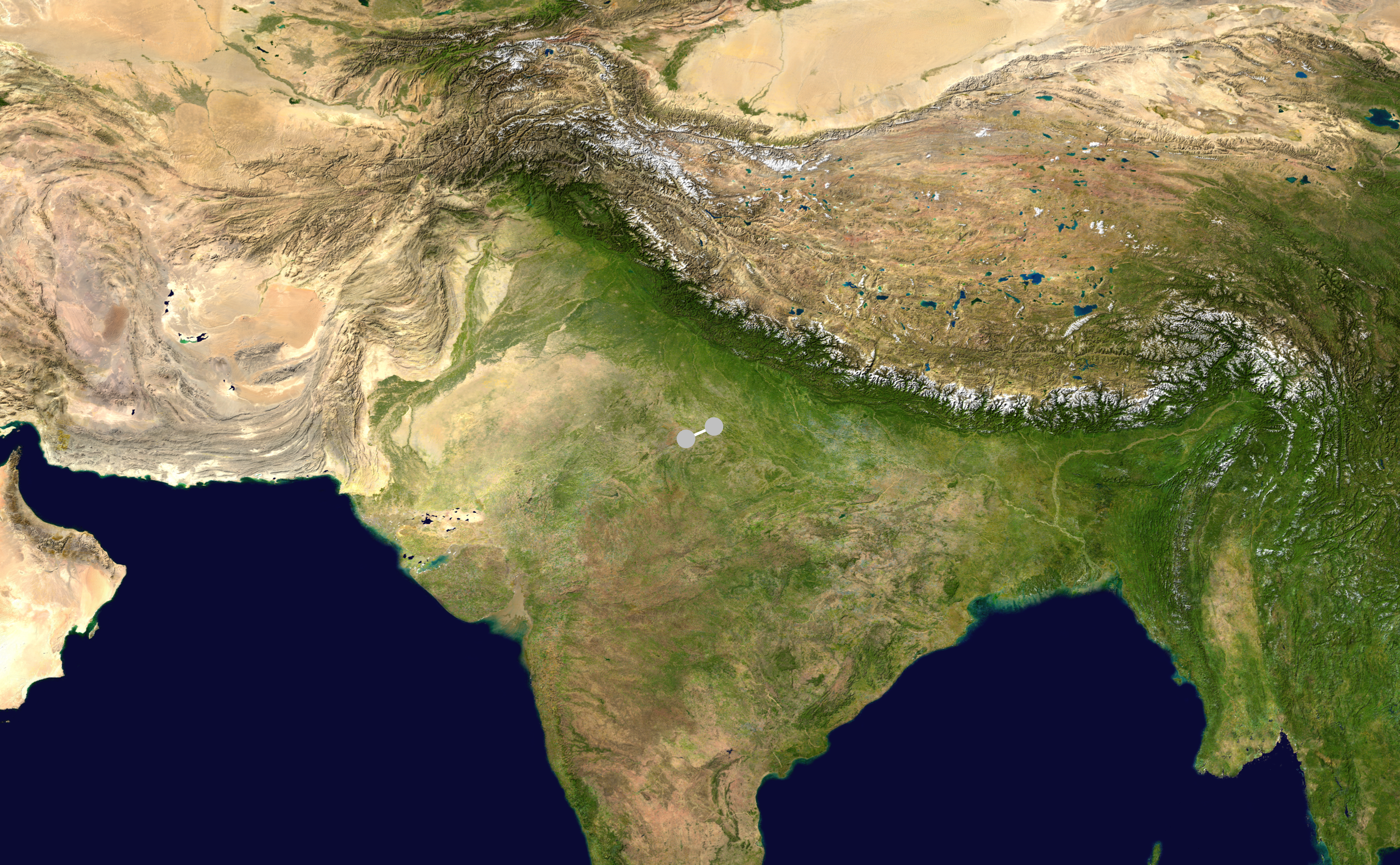
- Duration: July 31 – July 31

=== Tropical Storm Six (06B) ===
- Tropical storm (SSHWS)
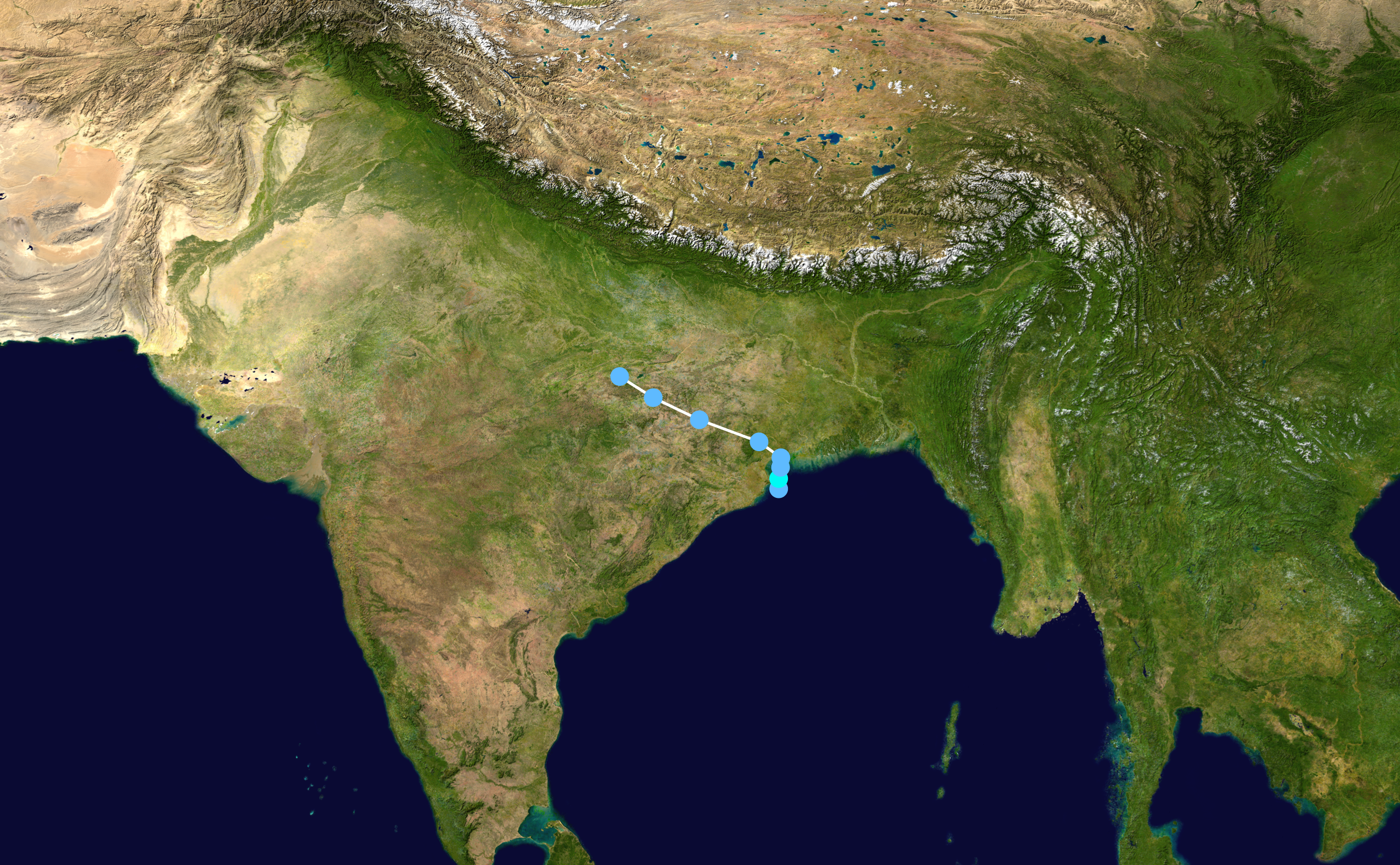
- Duration: August 23 – August 25
- Peak intensity: 65 km/h (40 mph) (1-min);

=== Depression Seven (07B) ===
- Tropical depression (SSHWS)
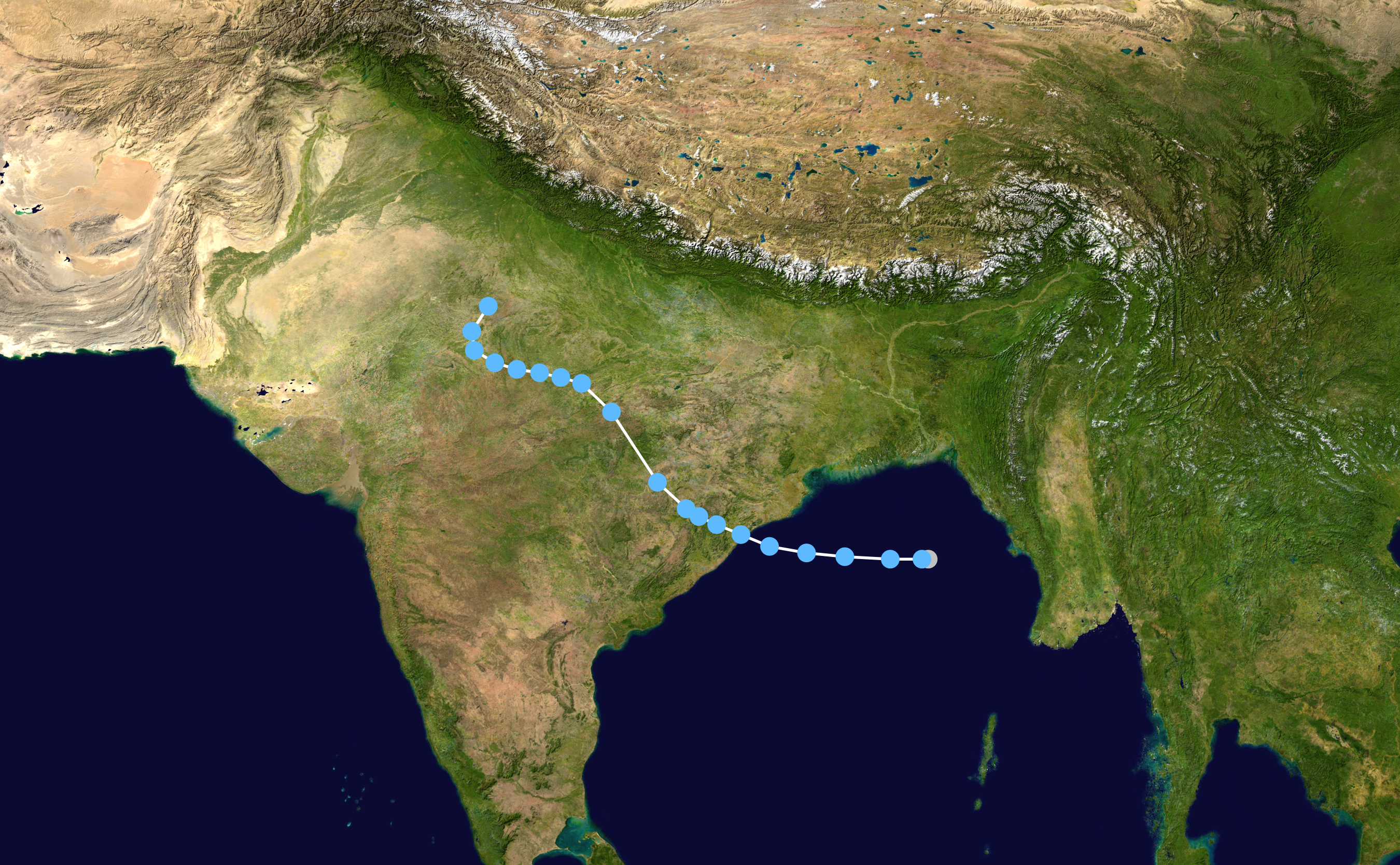
- Duration: August 30 – September 4
- Peak intensity: 45 km/h (30 mph) (1-min);

=== Depression Eight (08B) ===
- Tropical depression (SSHWS)
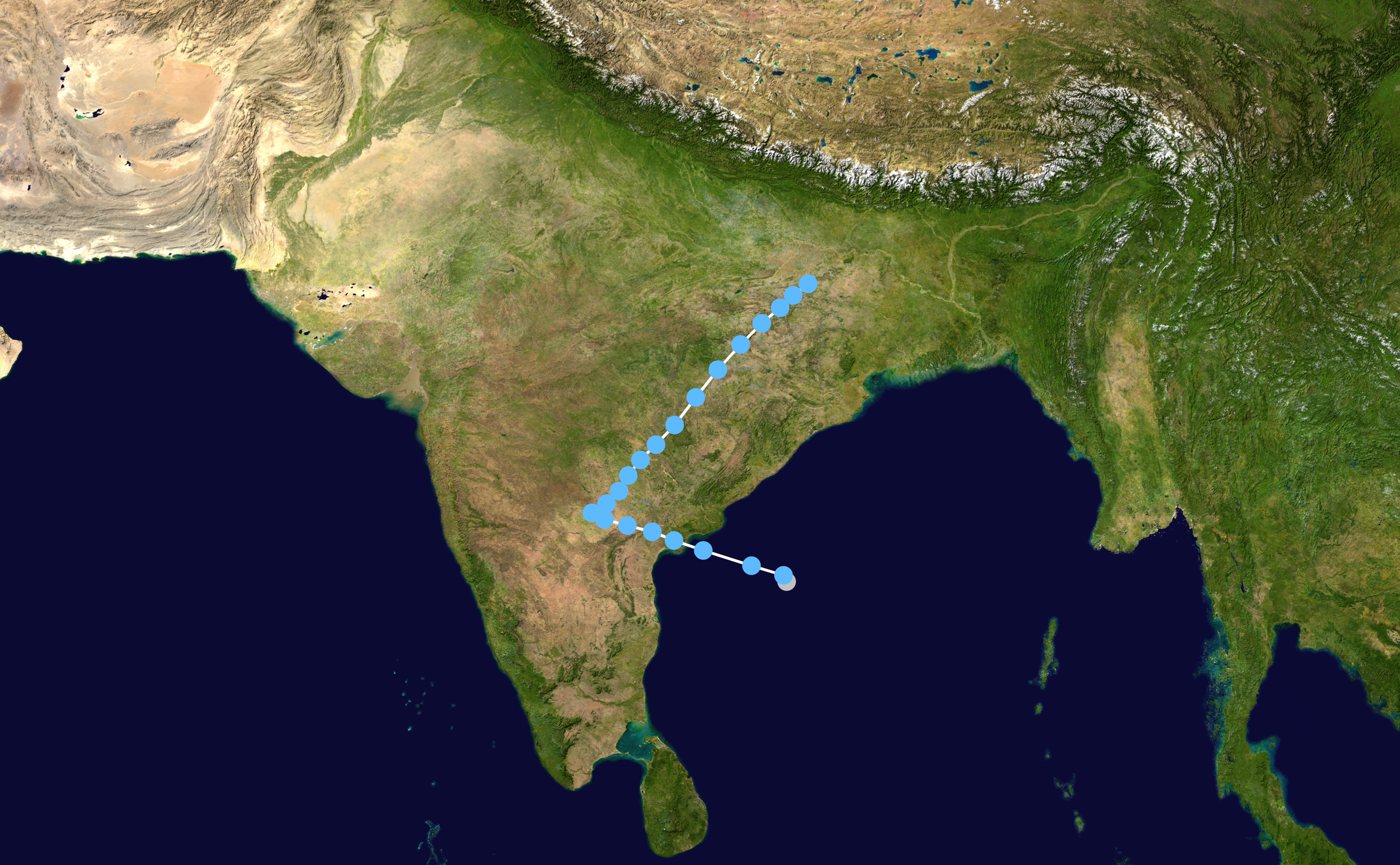
- Duration: September 18 – September 24
- Peak intensity: 45 km/h (30 mph) (1-min);

=== Depression Nine (09B) ===
- Tropical depression (SSHWS)
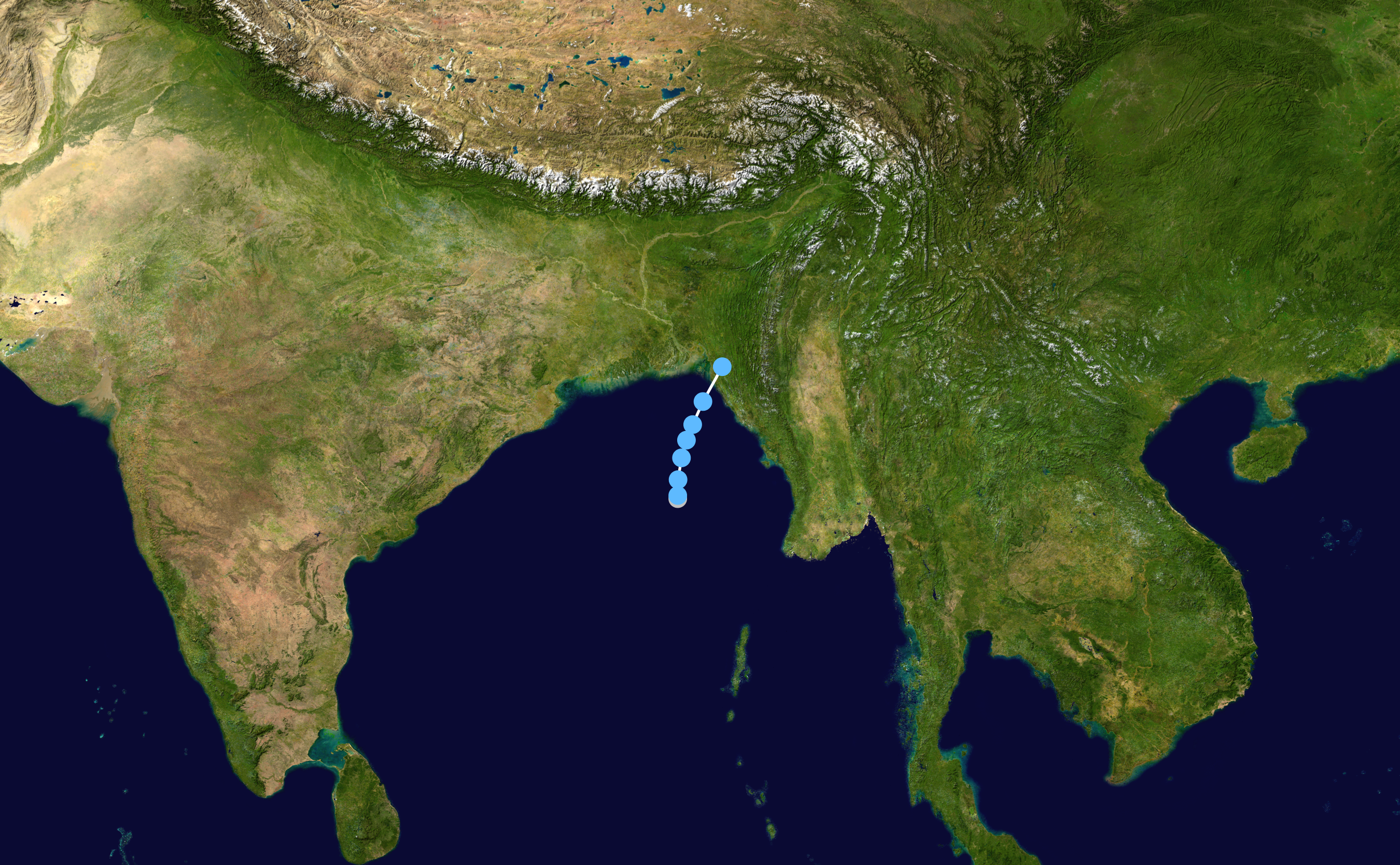
- Duration: October 6 – October 8
- Peak intensity: 45 km/h (30 mph) (1-min);

=== Depression Ten (10B) ===
- Tropical depression (SSHWS)
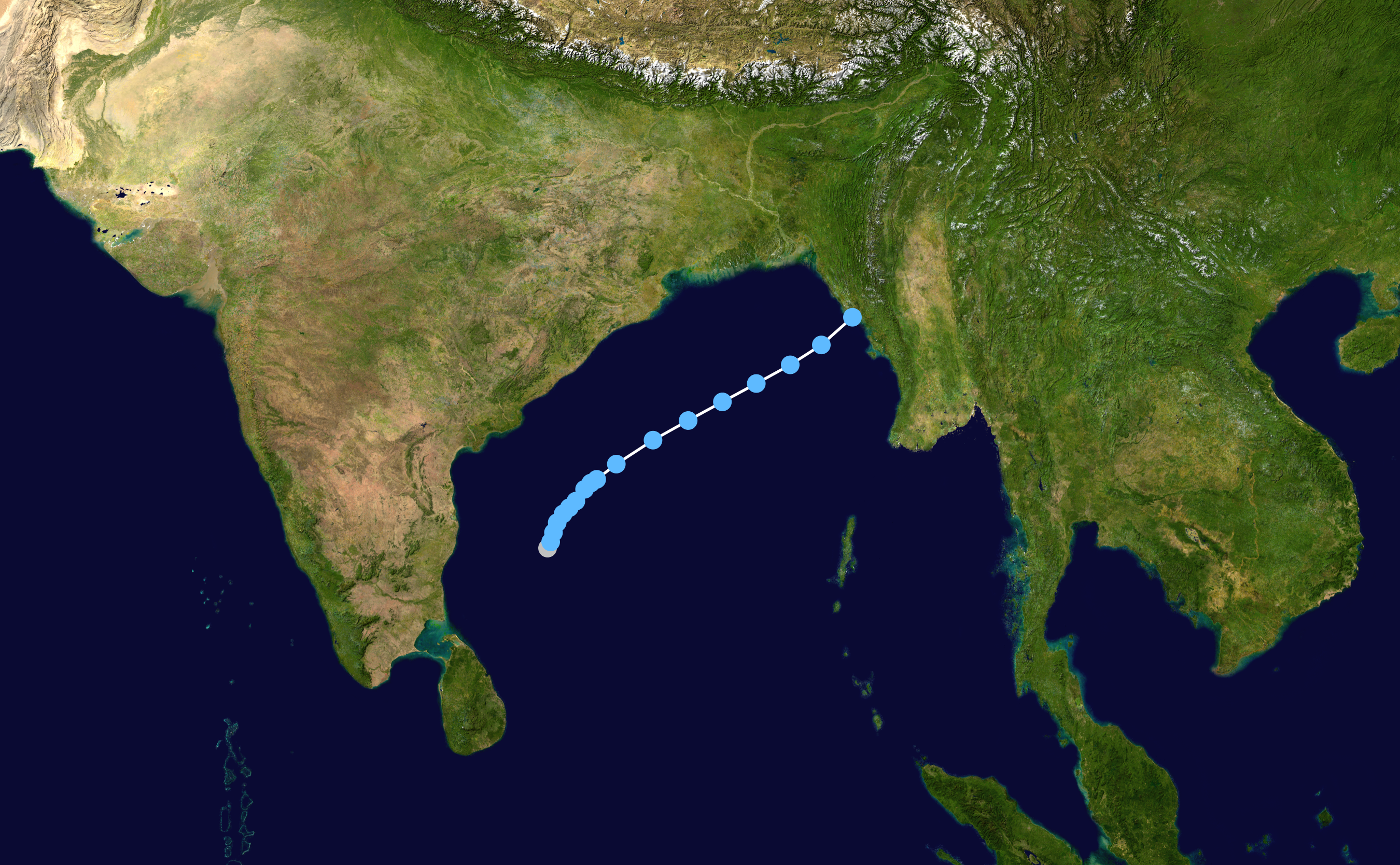
- Duration: October 20 – October 25
- Peak intensity: 45 km/h (30 mph) (1-min);

=== Tropical Storm Eleven (11B) ===
- Tropical storm (SSHWS)
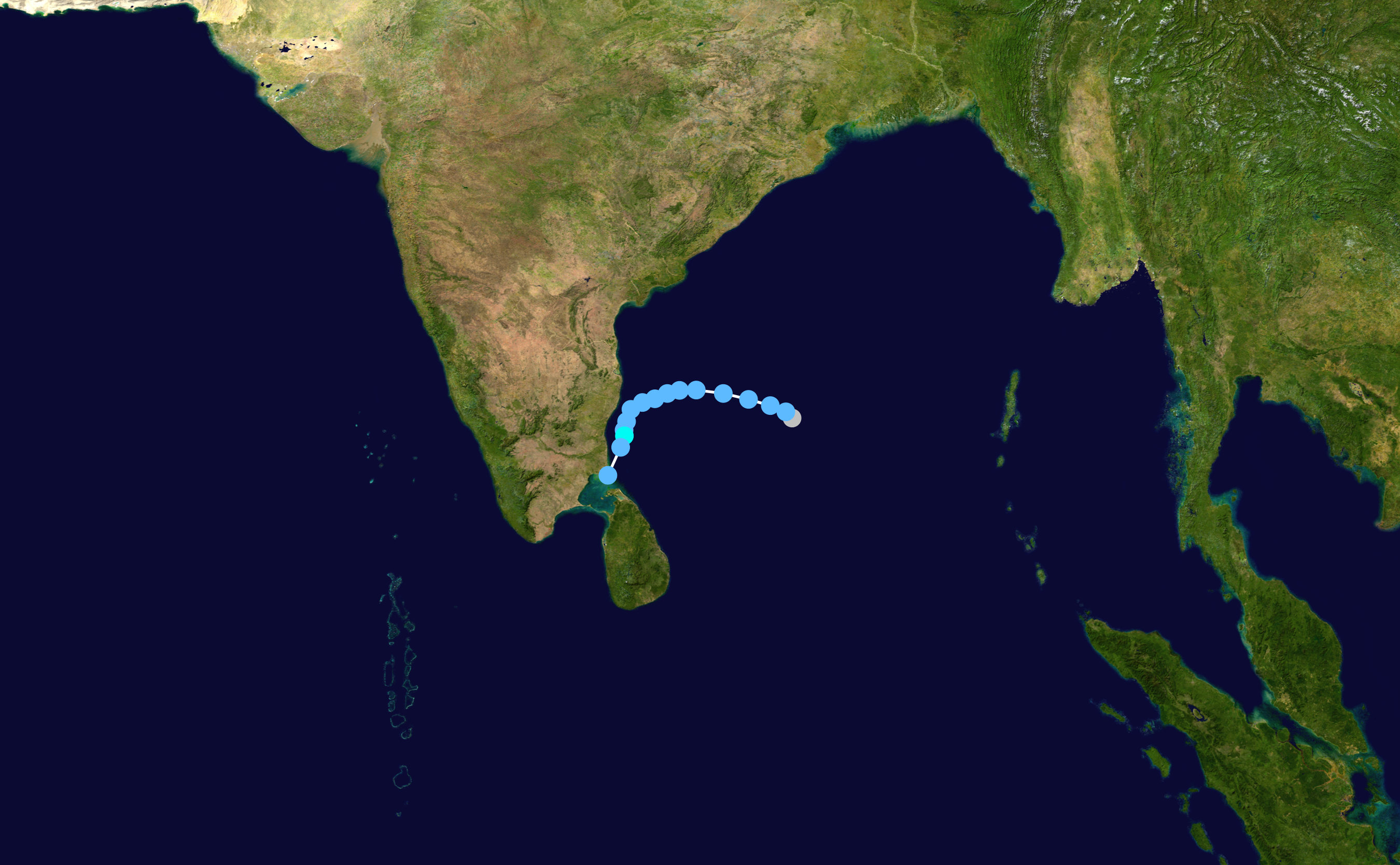
- Duration: November 5 – November 9
- Peak intensity: 65 km/h (40 mph) (1-min);

=== Tropical Storm Twelve (12A) ===
- Tropical storm (SSHWS)
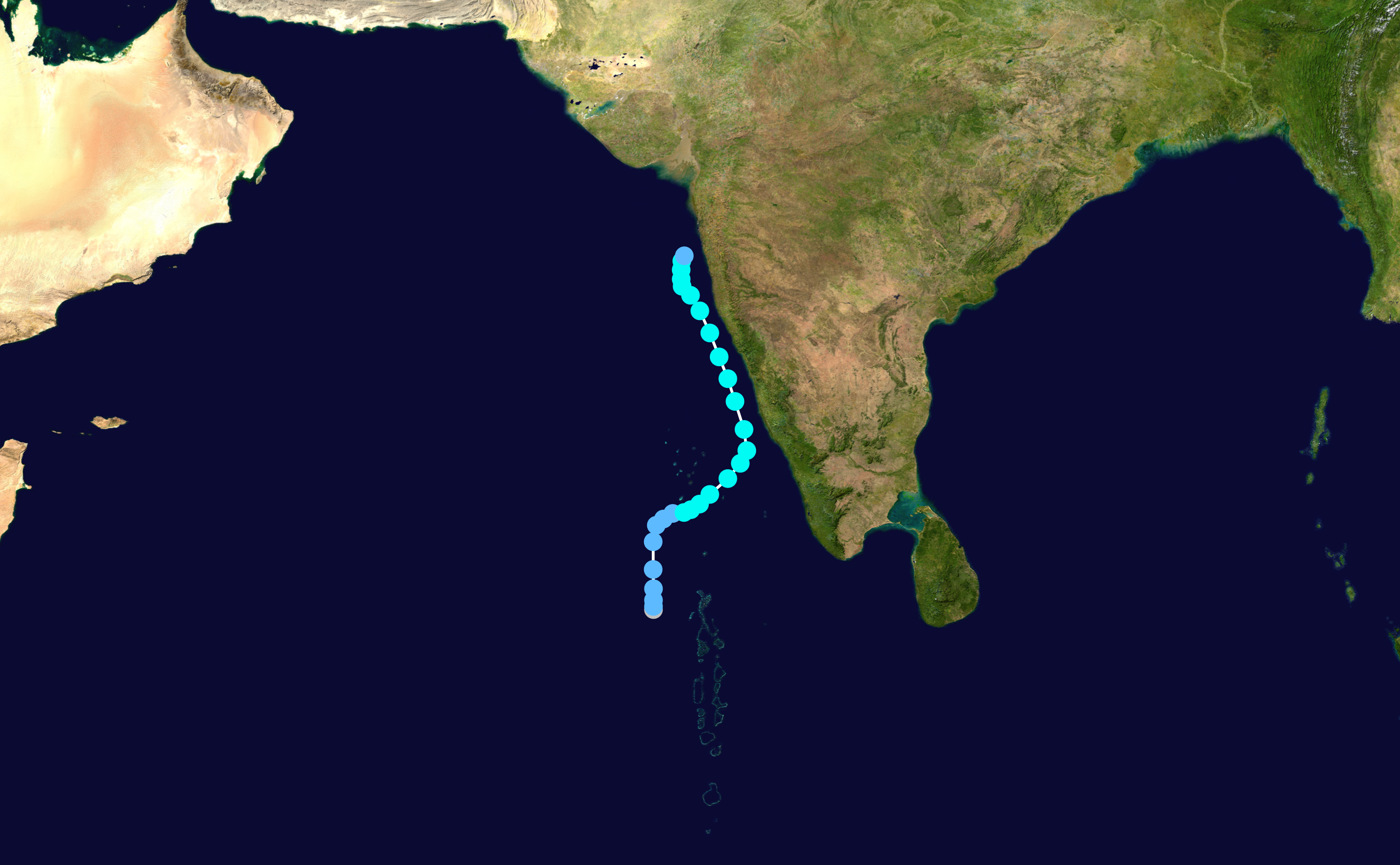
- Duration: December 5 – December 12
- Peak intensity: 65 km/h (40 mph) (1-min);

=== Cyclone Thirteen (13B) ===
- Category 1 tropical cyclone (SSHWS)
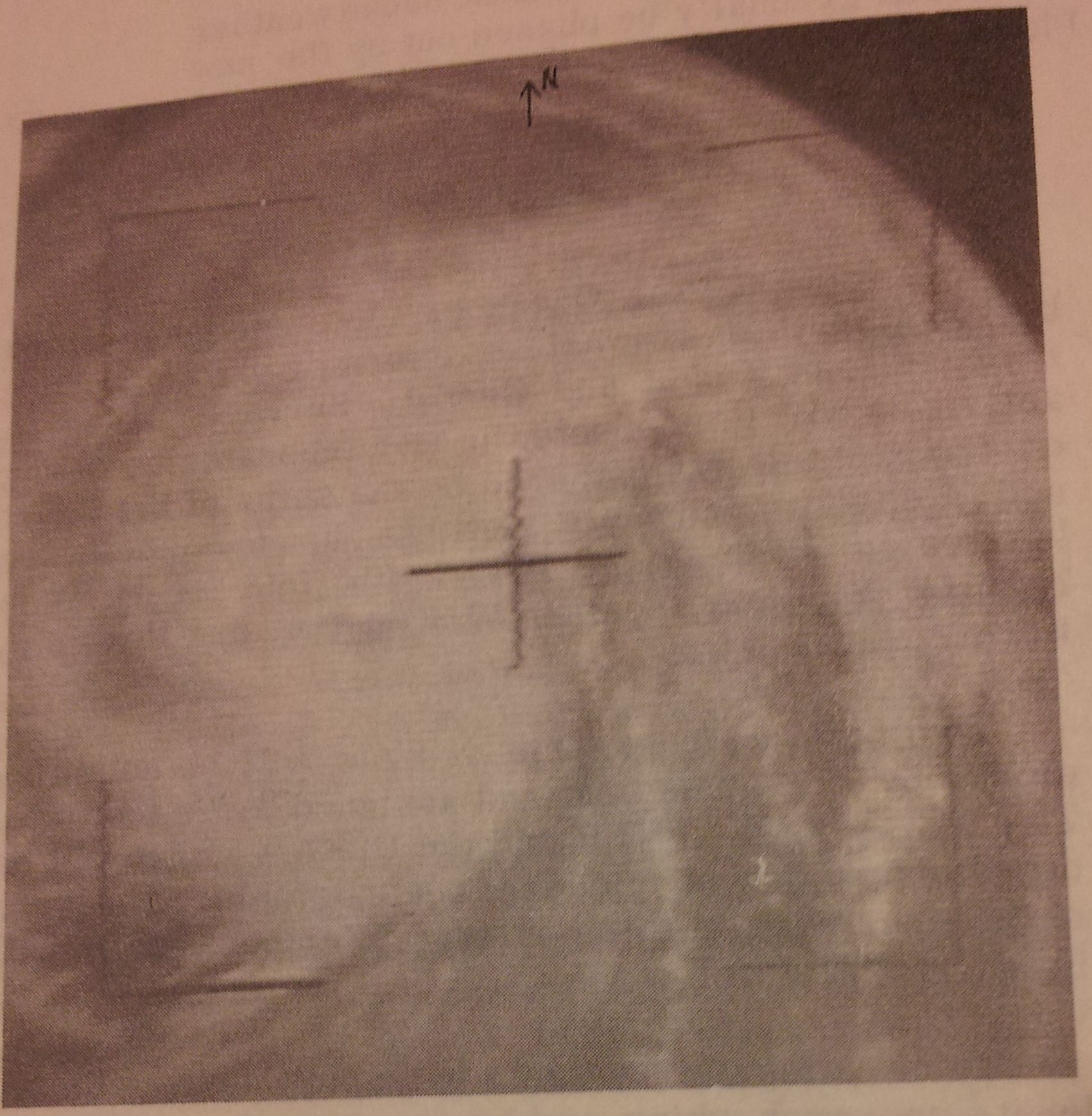
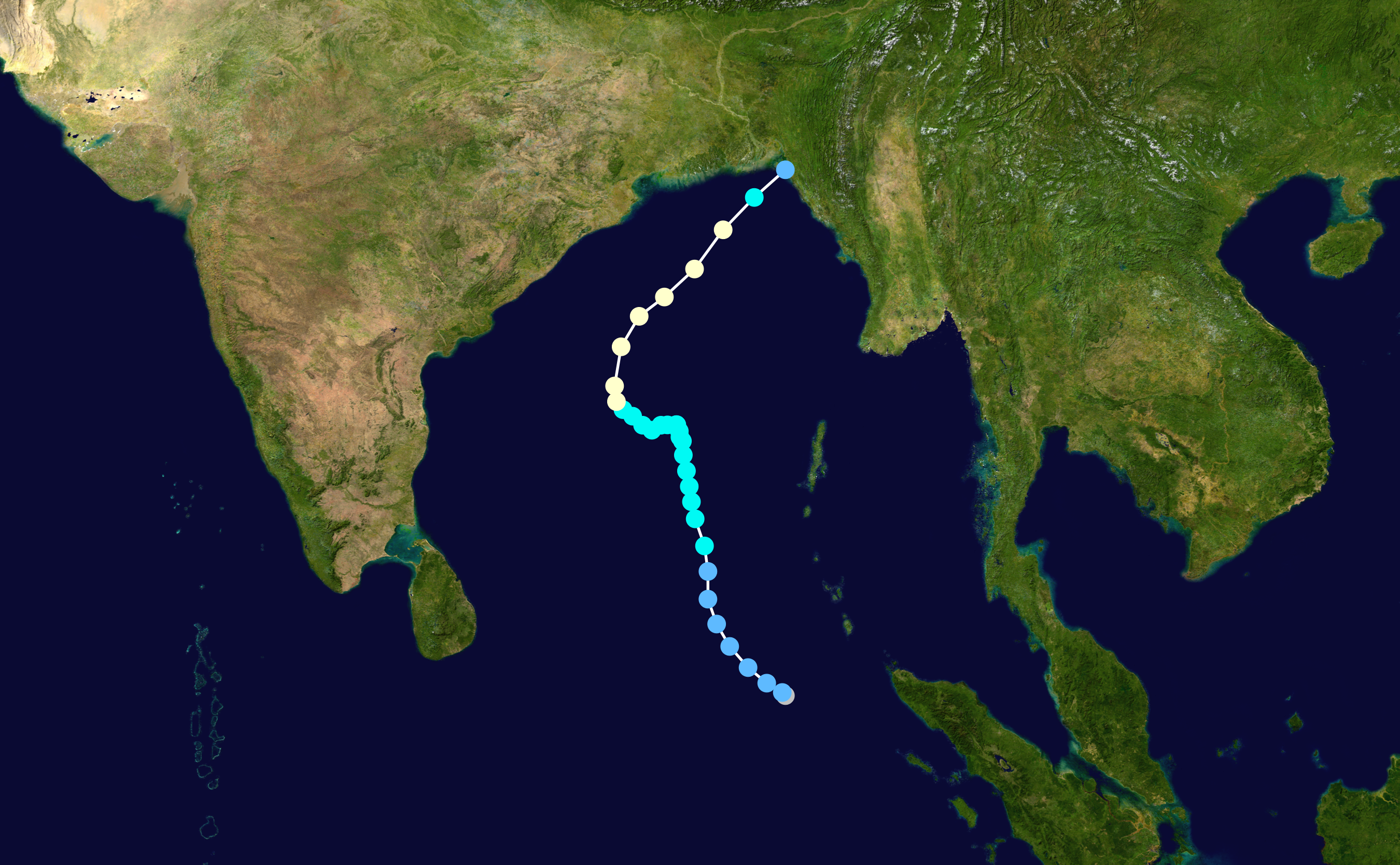
- Duration: December 5 – December 15
- Peak intensity: 120 km/h (75 mph) (1-min);

A cyclone hit East Pakistan on December 15, causing about 10,000 casualties.

=== Cyclone Fourteen (14B) ===
- Category 1 tropical cyclone (SSHWS)
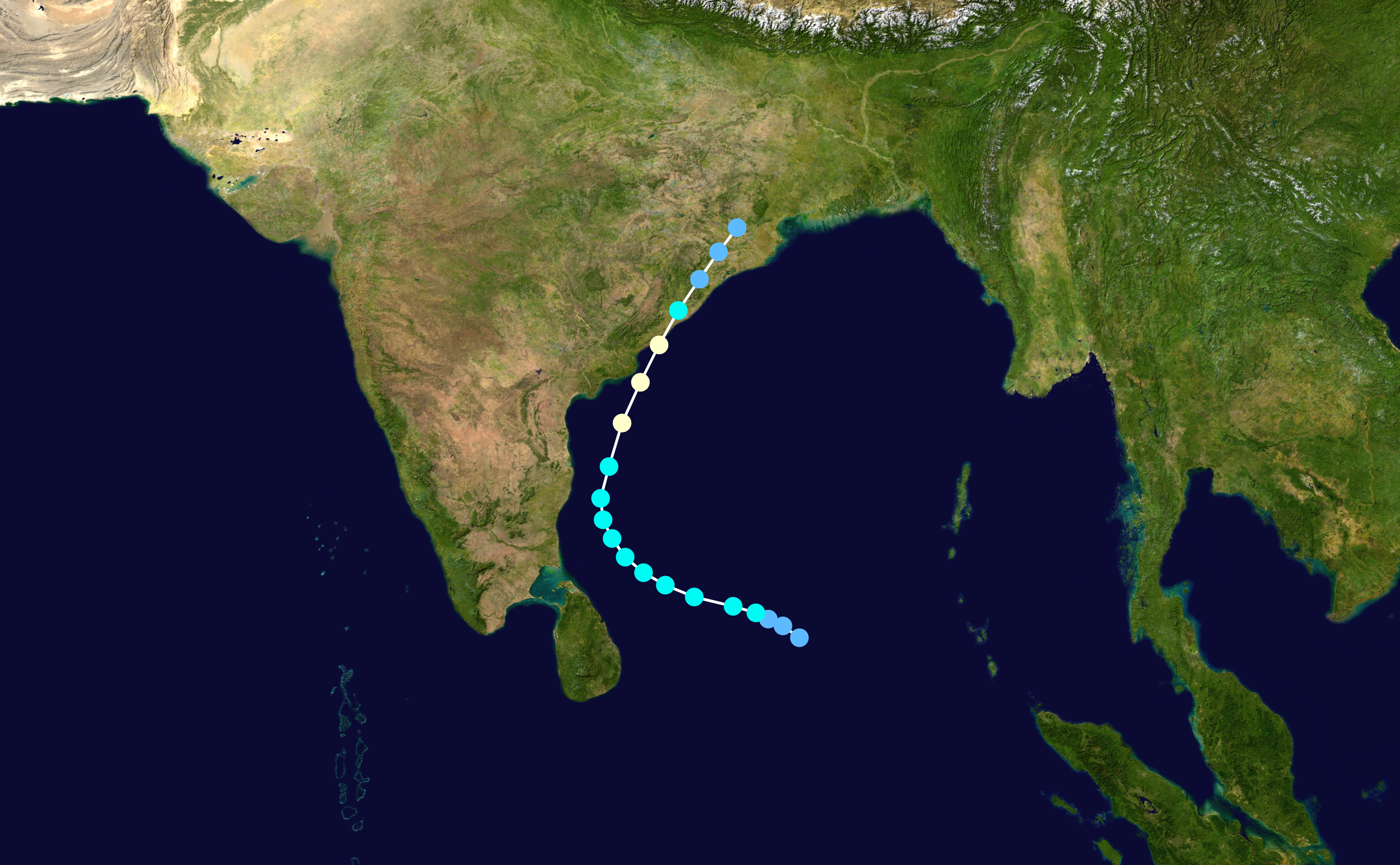
- Duration: December 30 – January 4
- Peak intensity: 120 km/h (75 mph) (1-min);

== See also ==
- North Indian Ocean tropical cyclone
- List of tropical cyclone records
- 1965 Atlantic hurricane season
- 1965 Pacific hurricane season
- 1965 Pacific typhoon season
- Australian cyclone seasons: 1964–65, 1965–66
- South Pacific cyclone seasons: 1964–65, 1965–66
- South-West Indian Ocean cyclone seasons: 1964–65, 1965–66
