= List of South-West Indian Ocean cyclones before 1900 =

Cyclone season in the Southwest Indian Ocean

The following is a list of South-West Indian Ocean tropical cyclones before the year 1900, or 20th century.

== Storms ==
=== 1848 ===
On January 11, 1848, the first tropical cyclone on record was observed in the basin.

=== April 1872 Zanzibar cyclone ===
On 14th April 1872 there are accounts of a tropical cyclone passing over Zanzibar.

=== April 1892 Mauritius cyclone ===
1200 deaths - 50,000 homeless. The most dramatic and the most devastating cyclone in the history of the country. Sugar production fell 42%. A third of the city of Port Louis was destroyed in a few hours.

=== February 1899 Madagascar cyclone ===
On February 4, a cyclone hit Vohemar in northeastern Madagascar, producing a minimum pressure of 972 mbar (28.7 inHg).

== See also ==
- South-West Indian Ocean tropical cyclone
- List of Australian region cyclones before 1900
- Pre-1900 South Pacific cyclone seasons
