= List of Australian region cyclones before 1900 =

Seasonal boundaries
- First system formed: 1568
- Last system dissipated: 1899

Seasonal statistics
- Total disturbances: 20
- Total fatalities: 500+
- Total damage: Unknown

The following is a list of Australian region tropical cyclones in or before 1900.

== Storms ==
- February 1568 – During February 1568, two ships which were sailing near the Solomon Islands, were driven southwards for six days by a tropical cyclone after they avoided being shipwrecked on a reef.
- April 1778 – A tropical cyclone impacted Indonesia's Banda Islands, where most of the houses were unroofed and 85% of nutmeg trees were destroyed.
- 1788 – A tropical cyclone destroyed two ships that had been sailing between Sydney and the Solomon Islands, under the command of Jean-François de Galaup, comte de Lapérouse. Most of the crew drowned, however, a number of them lived onshore for several years.
- 1811 – A tropical cyclone impacted Indonesia's Banda Islands.
- 1820 – A tropical cyclone impacted the Solomon Islands in or around 1820.
- December 1840 – A tropical cyclone impacted Papua New Guinea.
- April 1841 – A tropical cyclone impacted the Indonesian island of Roti, where it killed 75 people and destroyed numerous houses.
- 1850 – In or around 1850, a tropical cyclone impacted Indonesia's Kei Islands where numerous trees were uprooted.

=== Unnamed tropical cyclone (1872) ===
On 20 April 1872, a cyclone struck Roebourne in the Pilbara of Western Australia, effectively destroying the town.

=== Unnamed tropical cyclone (1875) ===
On 24 December 1875, a total of 59 lives were lost at sea when the eye of a cyclone passed over Exmouth Gulf. Several schooners were driven ashore and wrecked.

=== Unnamed tropical cyclone (1880) ===
On 9 January 1880, a cyclone passed near Yammadery Creek, between Onslow, Western Australia and Fortescue River, where the tidal surge was eight metres over the high-water mark. The Adalia was wrecked near Robe River and some of the crew drowned.

=== Unnamed tropical cyclone (1882) ===
On 7 March 1882, a severe tropical cyclone passed Roebourne and Cossack in the evening, damaging every building in the settlements. A minimum pressure of 942 hPa was recorded in Cossack. Many sheep died in the surrounding stations, although only one person was injured.

=== Unnamed tropical cyclone (1884) ===
On 30 January 1884, a severe cyclone hit Bowen in Queensland, causing damage to every building in the settlement and loss of the jetty and all boats and all communication.

=== Unnamed tropical cyclone (1887) ===
On 22 April 1887, a cyclone struck the pearling fleet at Ninety Mile Beach near Broome claiming 140 lives. The storm was unexpected since it was so late in the season.

=== Unnamed tropical cyclone (1889) ===
On 1 March 1889, flooding was considerable at Cossack where a cyclone coincided with high tide. All crew aboard the Waratah were lost off Cape Preston and one man drowned in the river at Roebourne.

=== Unnamed tropical cyclones (1894) ===
On 4 January 1894 and 9 January 1894 – Within the space of five days, two cyclones crossed the Pilbara coast. The first caused damage to many buildings at Roebourne and Cossack. The second cyclone caused more significant damage to the area completely washing away the previously damaged sea wall at Cossack. Over forty lives were believed to have been lost as twelve luggers and the steamer Anne were destroyed. Altogether, the damage was estimated at 15000 pounds and the loss of some 15000 sheep. Flooding was also substantial.

=== Cyclone Sigma (1896) ===
Cyclone Sigma was a tropical cyclone that caused severe damage in North Queensland, Australia on 26–27 January 1896. Overall 23 people died in the cyclone with 3 missing.

=== The Great Hurricane (1897) ===
On 6 January 1897, a cyclone impacted Darwin, Northern Territory. More than 28 people perished in the event, and much of Darwin was reduced to ruin.

=== Cyclone Eline (1898) ===
In January 1898, Cyclone Eline made landfall near Mackay, Queensland. The Cremorne Hotel in northern Mackay sustained damage, as well as the Methodist church on Gregory Street.

=== Unnamed tropical cyclone (1898) ===
On 2 April 1898, a cyclone was described as causing more damage at Cossack than had ever been experienced before. Tramway, rails, roads, and bridges were destroyed and telegraph lines are downed. Houses collapsed and all boats slipped their moorings. The damage was estimated at over 30000 pounds. Whim Creek registered 747 mm of rain in 24 hours, the highest daily rainfall ever recorded in Western Australia.

=== Severe Tropical Cyclone Mahina (1899) ===
Upon making landfall in Queensland as what was very likely an extremely powerful Category 5 severe tropical cyclone on March 4, 1899, Severe Tropical Cyclone Mahina produced a 40-foot storm surge, the highest ever recorded. The flooding killed 400–410 people, making it the deadliest cyclone in Australian history.

== See also ==
- Pre-1900 South Pacific cyclone seasons
- List of South-West Indian Ocean cyclones before 1900
