= 1890s Pacific typhoon seasons =

This article encompasses the 1890s Pacific typhoon seasons.

== 1890 season ==
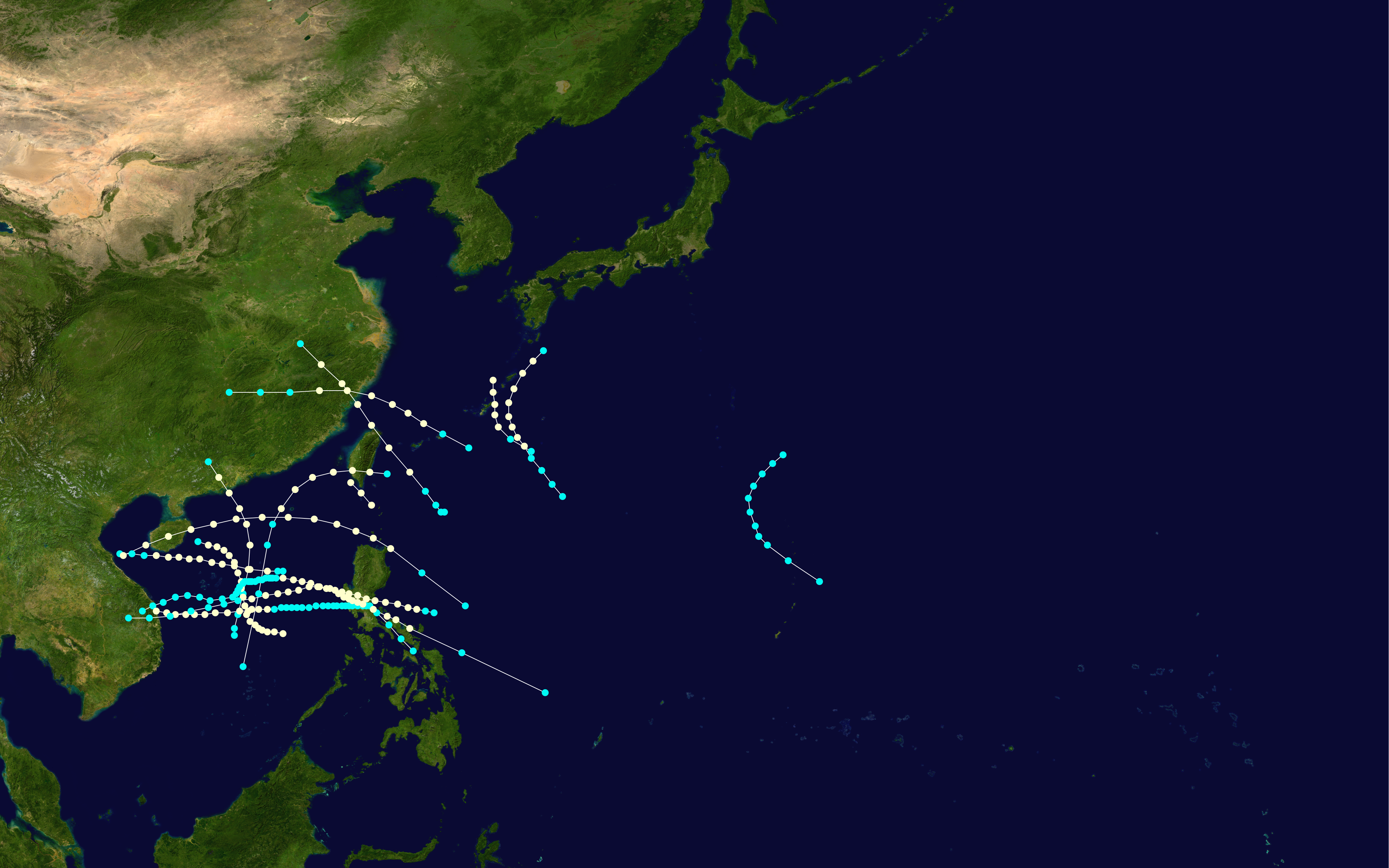
Season summary

There were at least 14 tropical cyclones in the western Pacific in 1890.

Not included in the above number, a typhoon offshore Wakayama Prefecture, Japan sank the Ottoman frigate Ertuğrul in the night of 16 September, leaving only 69 survivors among the 650 people on board. Successful rescue efforts and subsequent care for the survivors by the locals facilitated a lasting positive reception of Japan within Turkey.

== 1891 season ==
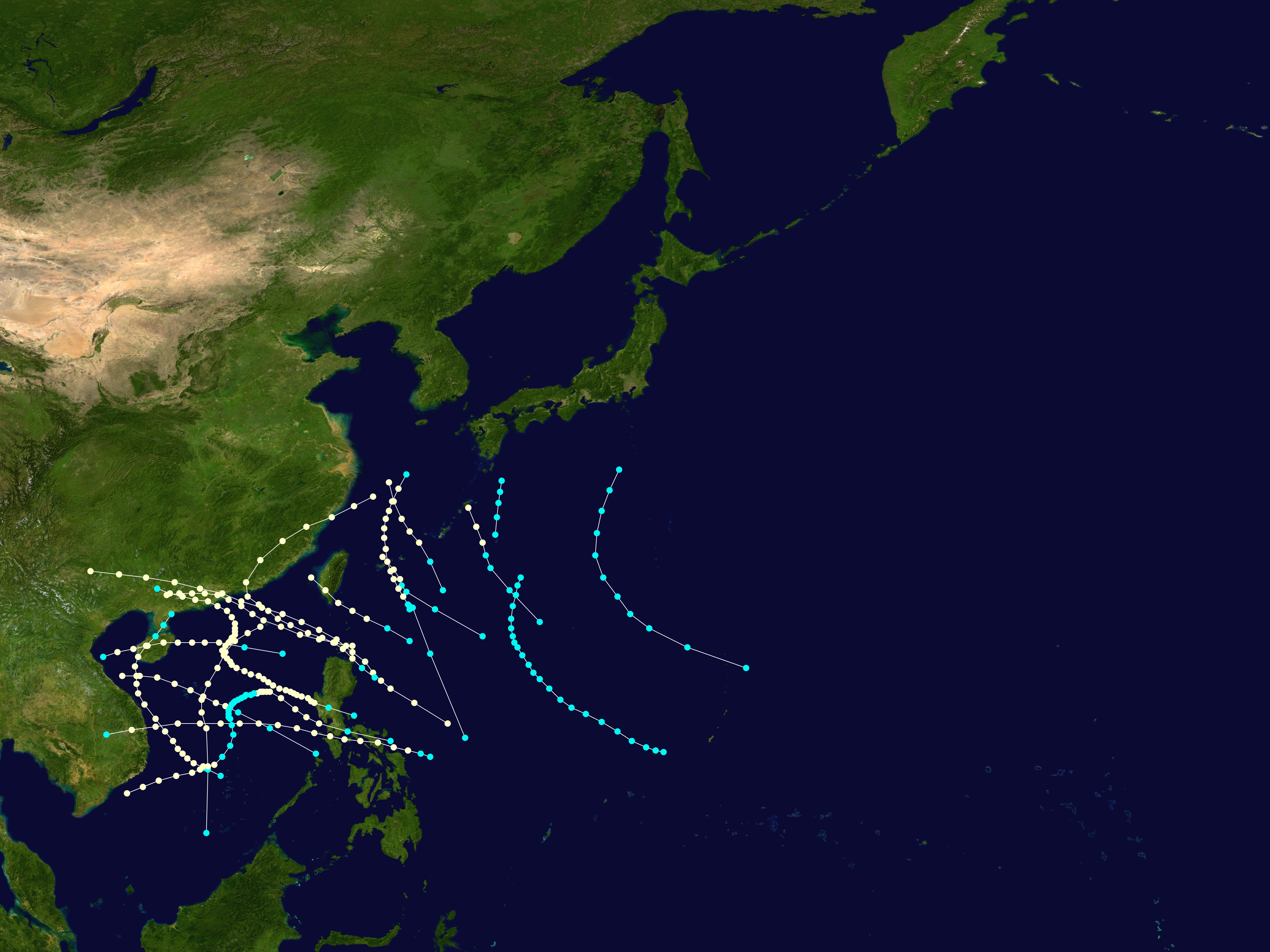
Season summary

There were 18 tropical cyclones in the western Pacific in 1891.

== 1892 season ==
There were 20 tropical cyclones in the western Pacific in 1892.

== 1893 season ==
There were 20 tropical cyclones in the western Pacific in 1893. Three successive typhoons struck Yangjiang on 29 September, 2 October, and 8 October respectively.

== 1894 season ==
There were 14 tropical cyclones in the western Pacific in 1894.

An unusually early typhoon made landfall in eastern Hainan Island on May 30.

A typhoon in September killed 2,000 people in China.

A tropical storm was first reported on October 1, which quickly moved westward across the Philippine archipelago. It moved northwestward through the South China Sea and slowed its forward motion. Over 27 hours, the system brought gale-force winds to Hong Kong, the longest duration as of 1955, due to the storm's slow movement and landfall on southern China on October 5. The storm also dropped 279.9 mm (11.02 in) of rainfall over 24 hours, making it the wettest storm in Hong Kong as of 1955. On the next day, the storm dissipated after turning to the northeast.

== 1895 season ==
There were 16 tropical cyclones in the western Pacific in 1895.

== 1896 season ==
There were 18 tropical cyclones in the western Pacific in 1896.

A tropical cyclone was observed on July 26 to the east of the Philippines. The system moved quickly to the northwest, crossing the extreme northern Luzon island on July 28. Next day, the storm struck southeastern China near Hong Kong, dissipating on July 30. At Hong Kong, where the storm produced winds of 128 km/h (79 mph) continuously for one hour, which was the highest hourly wind speed there as of 1955.

== 1897 season ==
There were 13 tropical cyclones in the western Pacific in 1897. Among these were a typhoon that struck the Philippines on October 7, which killed 1,500 people.

== 1898 season ==
There were 19 tropical cyclones in the western Pacific in 1898.

== 1899 season ==
There were 19 tropical cyclones in the Western Pacific in 1899.

April + May

On April 23 a tropical storm was reported southeast of Guam. It moved northwest and passed very close to Guam before moving to the north. It dissipated on April 28.

On May 18 a typhoon appeared to the east of Visayan Islands and moved inland on May 21. After crossing over into the South China Sea the storm moved northward. It passed through the Taiwan Strait between the 26 and 27 of May. On May 28 the storm was pushed out to sea by an advancing cold front and absorbed on May 29.

June + July

On June 27 a typhoon was detected to the southeast of Manila. It passed to the south through central Luzon island during June 28. It continued northwest and made landfall on the island of Hainan (China) on July 1. The storm later dissipated inland near the borders of Vietnam and China on July 3. There is some indication of damage at Sambonya, with a passing of a steamer noting all the buildings being nearly destroyed with few people seen.

On July 2 a typhoon was spotted to the south of Okinawa Islands. It moved north over the following days, reaching violent intensities, it brushed past the islands to the east on July 6 and 7. It continued north reaching Japan by July 8, briefly moved into the Sea of Japan, and dissipated on the Korean Peninsula on July 10. A minimal pressure of 956 hPa (28.23 inHg) was recorded at Oshima.
