= Pre-1900 South Pacific cyclone seasons =

Reported tropical cyclones within the South Pacific Ocean before 1900

Seasonal boundaries
- First system formed: February 1568
- Last system dissipated: April 12, 1900

Seasonal statistics
- Total disturbances: 174
- Total fatalities: 1000+
- Total damage: Unknown

Related articles
- List of Australian region cyclones before 1900; List of South-West Indian Ocean cyclones before 1900

The following is a list of all reported tropical cyclones within the South Pacific Ocean, to the east of 160°E, before 1900.

== Background ==
Ancient Polynesians and others who inhabited the tropical Pacific before the Europeans arrived, knew of and feared the hurricanes of the South Pacific. They were keen and accurate observers of nature and developed various myths and legends, which reflected their knowledge of these systems. For example, the people of Mangaia in the Cook Islands Islands had over 30 different names for the wind direction including Maoaketa, which indicated that a cyclonic storm existed to the west of the island. During the 1700s, Captain James Cook conducted three voyages within the Pacific Ocean and it is thought that he didn't collect any information about or experience any tropical cyclones. Europeans that followed Cook soon realised that the South Pacific was not free of hurricanes and were the first to publish accounts about the systems.

During 1853, Thomas Dobson became the first person to collate information about these systems, in order to attempt to understand and explain the characteristics of 24 tropical cyclones. However, these descriptions were considered to be vague and of little value, because he only had a small amount of data and no synoptic weather charts. Over the next 40 years various reports, journals and log books on the storms were published before E Knipping consolidated these reports and extended Dobson's list out to 120 tropical cyclones during 1893. During the 1920s Stephen Sargent Visher did some research into tropical cyclones in the Pacific and visited several island nations; including Fiji, Japan and the Philippines to obtain information on potential systems. He also consulted various journals and reports as well as Dobson's and Knipping's work, before he authored a number of papers on tropical cyclones in the Pacific. These papers contained information about 259 tropical storms in the South Pacific between 160°E and 140°W, two of which occurred during 1789 and 1819, while the rest occurred between 1830 and 1923. Visher also tried to estimate how many systems were occurring on an annual basis in each area, but overcompensated for his incomplete records and came up with a figure of 12 severe tropical cyclones per year. During Visher's time and until the start of World War II, there was insufficient information available to allow for an accurate deception of tropical cyclone tracks.

== Systems ==
=== Pre-1830s ===
- February 1568 – During February 1568, two ships which were sailing near the Solomon Islands, were driven southwards for six days by a tropical cyclone, after they avoided being shipwrecked on a reef.
- Around 1590 – A tropical cyclone impacted the Cook Islands, where it was estimated to have caused around 1000 to 2000 deaths.
- February 6, 1643 – Abel Tasman was sailing near Fiji and experienced either a hurricane or a severe gale.
- 1765 – During 1765, 20 people set sail from Tahiti and encountered a tropical cyclone, which guided four of them to the Cook Island of Atiu while the rest died at sea.
- June 3–15, 1783 – A tropical cyclone impacted Valparaíso in Chile.
- 1785 – A tropical cyclone impacted the Cook Islands and caused around 300 people to shelter in caves.
- 1788 – A tropical cyclone destroyed two ships that had been sailing between Sydney and the Solomon Islands, under the command of Jean-François de Galaup, comte de Lapérouse. Most of the crew drowned, however, a number of them lived onshore for several years.
- February 26, 1789 – A tropical cyclone impacted Norfolk Island.
- 1819 – A tropical cyclone impacted French Polynesia's Society Islands.
- 1820 – A tropical cyclone impacted the Solomon Islands in or around 1820.
- December 26, 1821 – A tropical cyclone impacted French Polynesia's Society Islands.
- January 1825 – A tropical cyclone impacted French Polynesia's Tuamotu Islands.
- June 23, 1827 – A tropical cyclone impacted Valparaíso in Chile.

=== 1830s ===
- March 1830 – A tropical cyclone impacted Tonga.
- 1830 – A tropical cyclone impacted New Caledonia.
- March 21–22, 1831 – A tropical cyclone impacted Fiji.
- December 21 – 23, 1831 – A tropical cyclone moved in between the Samoan Islands and the Southern Cook Islands, with significant damage occurring in Rarotonga while strong winds were also recorded in French Polynesia's Society Islands.
- January 24, 1833 – A tropical cyclone impacted Tonga's Vavaʻu island group.
- March 9, 1833 – A tropical cyclone impacted Tonga's Ha'apai island group.
- 1834 – A tropical cyclone impacted Tonga's Ha'apai island group.
- November 1835 – A tropical cyclone impacted Tonga's Ha'apai and Vavaʻu island groups.
- 1836 – A tropical cyclone impacted the Samoan Islands.
- February 7–10, 1839 – A tropical cyclone impacted the Cook Islands.
- February 7–10, 1839 – A tropical cyclone impacted Tonga's Ha'apai island group.
- February 1839 – A tropical cyclone impacted Fiji's Windward Islands.
- March 1839 – A tropical cyclone impacted Fiji's Windward Islands.
- December 29, 1839 – A tropical cyclone impacted Samoa.

=== 1840s ===
- February 22–25, 1840 – A tropical cyclone impacted Fiji and the Cook Islands.
- February 27, 1840 – A tropical cyclone impacted the Fijian island of Viti Levu, where heavy rain caused flooding which inundated several homes within the Rewa Province.
- March 1840 – A tropical cyclone impacted the Fijian province of Macuata, where crops were reported to have been damaged.
- December 16–17, 1840 – A tropical cyclone impacted Samoa and the Cook Islands.
- December 1840 – A tropical cyclone occurred to the west of the Solomon Islands near the east coast of New Guinea.
- 1840 – A tropical cyclone impacted Tonga's Vavaʻu island group.
- January 22–24, 1842 – A tropical cyclone impacted Fiji's Lau Islands, where bananas and breadfruits were blown down.
- December 15–18, 1842 – A tropical cyclone impacted Samoa, where bananas and breadfruits were blown down, trees were uprooted and houses damaged.
- December 1842 – A tropical cyclone impacted the Cook Islands, where one person was killed on a ship near Mangaia.
- December 19–21, 1843 – A weak tropical cyclone impacted French Polynesia, where it caused four deaths and severe damage on the islands of Maupiti, Tahaa, Huahine and Bora-Bora.
- March 13, 1844 – A tropical cyclone impacted Fiji.
- January 16–17, 1845 – A tropical cyclone impacted the Cook Islands.
- March 10, 1846 – A tropical cyclone impacted Norfolk Island.
- March 16–17, 1846 – A tropical cyclone impacted Samoa and the Cook Islands.
- January 16, 1847 – A tropical cyclone impacted the island of Tanna within Vanuatu.
- March 2–11, 1847 – A tropical cyclone impacted southern Vanuatu, New Caledonia and Norfolk Island.
- October 5–6, 1847 – A tropical cyclone impacted Norfolk Island.
- January 13–16, 1848 – A tropical cyclone caused a severe flood as it impacted Fiji's Vanua Levu.
- February 10–15, 1848 – A tropical cyclone impacted Vanuatu and New Caledonia.
- April 5–8, 1848 – A tropical cyclone impacted Fiji and Tonga.
- April 12–15, 1848 – A tropical cyclone impacted Tonga.
- April 1848 – A tropical cyclone impacted American Samoa.
- December 24, 1848 – A tropical cyclone impacted the Cook Islands, Samoa and French Polynesia.
- December 25, 1848 – A tropical cyclone was located near Vanuatu.
- February 12–15, 1849 – A tropical cyclone impacted New Caledonia.
- February 1849 – A tropical cyclone impacted Vanuatu.
- March 16, 1849 – A tropical cyclone impacted Vanuatu.

=== 1850s ===
- April 4–7, 1850 – A tropical cyclone impacted Samoa and American Samoa, with severe damage to houses, coconut and breadfruit trees was reported on the island of Tutuila. Two ships and a schooner were wrecked at Apia, while a landslide from a mountain buried and killed three people.
- April 1850 – A tropical cyclone impacted the Cook Islands of Mangaia and Rarotonga.
- 1850 – According to genealogical data collected by Hogbin in 1934, a tropical cyclone impacted the Solomon Islands in or around 1850.
- February 18–24, 1852 – A tropical cyclone impacted Vanuatu, New Caledonia and Norfolk Island.
- March 5–6, 1852 – A tropical cyclone impacted Norfolk Island.
- January 1, 1854 – A tropical cyclone impacted Vanuatu and New Caledonia.
- February 28, 1854 – A tropical cyclone impacted Vanuatu, where it caused a lot of damage to the native's plantations.
- March 17, 1854 – A tropical cyclone impacted Western Fiji.
- April 1855 – A tropical cyclone impacted the Samoan island of Upolu, where eight European vessels were wrecked.
- January 22, 1856 – A tropical cyclone impacted the French Polynesian island of Tahiti.
- March 11, 1856 – A tropical cyclone impacted Valparaíso in Chile.
- March 1856 – A tropical cyclone impacted Fiji and Tonga.
- May 1856 – A ship experienced what they thought was a hurricane while sailing between New Zealand and Norfolk Island.
- January 29, 1858 – A tropical cyclone impacted Vanuatu.
- February 21, 1859 – A tropical cyclone was located to the southeast of Norfolk Island.

=== 1860s ===
- January 28, 1860 – A tropical cyclone impacted Fiji.
- March 14, 1860 – A tropical cyclone was located to the west of Vanuatu.
- January 3, 1861 – A tropical cyclone impacted Vanuatu.
- January 10, 1861 – A tropical cyclone impacted Vanuatu.
- March 15, 1861 – A tropical cyclone impacted Vanuatu.
- December 1861 – A tropical cyclone impacted French Polynesia's Society Islands.
- January 17–18, 1862 – A tropical cyclone was located to the southeast of the island of Tanna in Vanuatu.
- January 10–15, 1863 – A tropical cyclone was located to the southeast of Apia in Samoa.
- January 10–15, 1863 – A tropical cyclone impacted Tonga and possibly the island nation of Niue.
- February 24, 1864 – A tropical cyclone impacted New Caledonia, where the wind and rain caused severe damage.
- March 29, 1864 – A tropical cyclone impacted Tonga and Fiji's Lau Islands.
- June 2–9, 1864 – A tropical cyclone impacted Valparaíso in Chile.
- January 25 – February 3, 1865 – A tropical cyclone impacted Samoa and the Southern Cook Islands.
- February 2–3, 1865 – A tropical cyclone caused major damage to French Polynesia, including on the Leeward Islands, Tahiti and the Austral Islands.
- January 7–8, 1866 – A tropical cyclone caused widespread damage on the Fijian islands of Viti Levu and Vanua Levu, as it passed in between the two islands on Ovalau.
- March 10–12, 1866 – A tropical cyclone passed in between Viti Levu and Vanua Levu, where food gardens and coffee plantations were covered in silt.
- March 27, 1866 – A tropical cyclone impacted the southern Cook Island of Mangaia, where it unroofed the churches at Oneroa and Tamarau, destroyed 268 houses and uprooted 2000 trees.
- February 27, 1867 – A tropical cyclone was located to the west of Vanuatu.
- March 7, 1867 – A tropical cyclone impacted the islands of Futuna and Efate.
- March 1867 – A tropical cyclone impacted the southern Cook Island of Mangaia.
- January 30, 1868 – A tropical cyclone was located near Vanuatu.
- April 21, 1868 – A tropical cyclone was located near Vanuatu.
- May 17, 1868 – A tropical cyclone was located near Vanuatu.
- January 11, 1869 – A tropical cyclone was located near Vanuatu.
- January 12, 1869 – A tropical cyclone was located to the southwest of Apia, Samoa.
- January 31, 1869 – A tropical cyclone was located to the north of Apia, Samoa.
- February 23, 1869 – A tropical cyclone was located near Vanuatu.
- March 6–7, 1869 – A tropical cyclone was located to the west of Apia, Samoa.
- March 16–17, 1869 – A tropical cyclone was located to the southwest of Apia, Samoa.
- March 1869 – A tropical cyclone impacted the Fijian island of Viti Levu, where it caused several deaths and widespread devastation.
- March 1869 – A tropical cyclone impacted the Southern Cook Islands.
- March 1869 – A tropical cyclone existed to the south of the Austral Islands.

=== 1870s ===
- January 1870 – A tropical cyclone devastated the Samoan island of Upolu.
- January 1870 – A tropical cyclone impacted the Samoan island of Tutuila.
- 1871 – A tropical cyclone impacted Fiji.
- March 17–22, 1871 – A tropical cyclone impacted Fiji and Vanuatu.
- February 17, 1872 – After a drought had been recorded in the island nation, a tropical cyclone impacted Vanuatu including the island of Futuna.
- April 4 – 6, 1872 – A tropical cyclone impacted New Caledonia.
- January 3–7, 1873 – A tropical cyclone impacted Fiji, Vanuatu and New Caledonia.
- December 30, 1873 – January 6, 1874 – A tropical cyclone impacted Vanuatu and Fiji.
- January 14–15, 1874 – HMS Renard encountered a tropical cyclone, while it was located about 645 km (400 mi) to the southwest of Kadavu in Fiji.
- February 12–13, 1874 – A tropical cyclone impacted Tonga.
- February 15, 1874 – A tropical cyclone was located to the west of Vanua Levu in Fiji.
- February 15–25, 1874 – A tropical cyclone impacted Vanuatu and New Caledonia from the north.
- April 10, 1874 – A tropical cyclone was located to the southeast of Tonga.
- October 2, 1874 – A tropical cyclone was located near Vanuatu.
- November 13, 1874 – A tropical cyclone passed just to the south of Tonga.
- January 4–7, 1875 – A tropical cyclone impacted Rotuma, Fiji and Tonga.
- January 4–9, 1875 – A tropical cyclone impacted French Polynesia's Tuamotu Islands.
- February 16–20, 1875 – A tropical cyclone impacted Fiji.
- March 12–13, 1875 – A tropical cyclone impacted Fiji and Tonga.
- June 1875 – A tropical cyclone impacted the island of Tanna in Vanuatu.
- November 15 – 21, 1875 – A tropical cyclone impacted Fiji, Samoa and Tonga.
- December 24 – 25, 1875 – A tropical cyclone existed in between Samoa and French Polynesia.
- January 10, 1876 – A tropical cyclone impacted Fiji.
- February 23 – 24, 1876 – A tropical cyclone impacted New Caledonia, where plantations were devastated by river floods.
- March 16, 1876 – A tropical cyclone impacted the northeastern coast of Viti Levu and passed to the south of Levuka.
- January 15, 1877 – A tropical cyclone impacted the whole of Vanuatu.
- January 18–19, 1877 – A tropical cyclone existed in between French Polynesia's Society and Tuamotu Islands, however, no information is available about any impacts experienced within the island groups.
- January 22, 1877 – A tropical cyclone existed to the southwest of Apia, Samoa.
- February 24, 1877 – A tropical cyclone existed to the east of the Cook Islands.
- March 14–20, 1877 – A tropical cyclone impacted Samoa and Tonga.
- March 31, 1877 – A tropical cyclone impacted Fiji and Tonga.
- April 3, 1877 – A tropical cyclone existed to the southwest of Apia, Samoa.
- September 2, 1877 – A tropical cyclone impacted French Polynesia.
- December 19, 1877 – A tropical cyclone existed to the southwest of Tonga.
- January 7–9, 1878 – A tropical cyclone impacted Vanuatu.
- January 31, 1878 – A tropical cyclone impacted New Caledonia.
- February 5–8, 1878 – A tropical cyclone impacted French Polynesia's Tuamotu Islands where it caused 117 deaths and severe damage.
- January 2–12, 1879 – A tropical cyclone impacted Norfolk Island.
- January 9–10, 1879 – A tropical cyclone was located near Vanuatu.
- March 3–9, 1879 – A tropical cyclone impacted the Samoan and Tongan islands.
- December 11–12, 1879 – A tropical cyclone impacted the whole of Fiji, where it caused severe damage to Viti Levu and devastated Rotuma.

=== 1880s ===
- January 16–20, 1880 – A tropical cyclone impacted the Solomon Island of Savo, where a sailing vessel called the 'Meteor' broke up after being driven ashore during January 20, 1880.
- January 21–26, 1880 – A tropical cyclone impacted Fiji.
- January 21–26, 1880 – A tropical cyclone impacted Vanuatu and southern New Caledonia. Within New Caledonia, the system was reported to have caused 16 deaths, while nine ships were either sunk or stranded, docks collapsed and major damage to buildings and plantations was reported.
- February 3–11, 1880 – A tropical cyclone impacted New Caledonia.
- March 8–10, 1880 – A tropical cyclone impacted New Caledonia.
- February 2–3, 1881 – A tropical cyclone impacted Tuvalu and Fiji.
- March 1881 – A tropical cyclone existed to the west of Viti Levu in Fiji.
- December 6, 1881 – A tropical cyclone was located between the Solomon Islands and Vanuatu.
- December 31, 1881 – A tropical cyclone impacted Fiji.
- January 1882 – A tropical cyclone impacted Fiji.
- February 2, 1882 – A tropical cyclone impacted Tonga and the Cook Islands.
- March 13 or 18, 1882 – A tropical cyclone impacted French Polynesia's Austral Islands.
- January 1, 1883 – A tropical cyclone was located to the north of Tonga.
- January 12, 1883 – A tropical cyclone impacted Fiji and Tonga.
- Febueray 1883 – A tropical cyclone generated a storm surge over French Polynesia.
- February 24, 1883 – A tropical cyclone impacted Fiji.
- March 12–20, 1883 – A tropical cyclone impacted Fiji.
- March 24–25, 1883 – A tropical cyclone impacted the Samoan Islands of Upolu and Savaii.
- December 23–24, 1883 – A tropical cyclone impacted Tuvalu.
- December 27–28, 1883 – A tropical cyclone impacted Fiji.
- December 1883 – A tropical cyclone caused severe damage to Palmerston Atoll in the Southern Cook Islands.
- January 9, 1884 – A tropical cyclone impacted northwest Vanua Levu, with the center passing near or over Bua.
- February 7, 1884 – A tropical cyclone recurved to the east of Bua in Fiji.
- January 15, 1885 – A tropical cyclone was located to the southwest of Samoa.
- March 11, 1885 – A tropical cyclone impacted New Caledonia.
- January 6, 1886 – A tropical cyclone impacted the Samoan island of Upolu.
- January 1886 – A tropical cyclone impacted the west coast of Viti Levu.
- March 3–4, 1886 – A tropical cyclone impacted the whole of Fiji, with severe damage on Taveuni and within the Lau Islands.
- March 14–15, 1886 – A tropical cyclone impacted Tuvalu.
- January 5, 1887 – A tropical cyclone was located to the south of Tonga.
- January 6, 1887 – A tropical cyclone impacted New Caledonia.
- March 30, 1887 – A tropical cyclone impacted Fiji.
- April 10–11, 1887 – A tropical cyclone was located to the south of French Polynesia's Austral Islands.
- February 1888 – A tropical cyclone impacted Fiji.
- February 8, 1888 - A tropical cyclone generated a storm surge over French Polynesia.
- January 23, 1889 – A tropical cyclone impacted Fiji.
- February 9–18, 1889 – A tropical cyclone impacted Wallis and Futuna, Samoa and the Cook Islands.
- March 7–8, 1889 – A tropical cyclone impacted Samoa.
- March 13–19, 1889 – A tropical cyclone impacted the Samoan islands and killed 147 people.
- March 16, 1889 – A tropical cyclone was located to the west of Vanuatu.
- March 16, 1889 – A tropical cyclone generated a storm surge over French Polynesia's Windward Islands.

=== 1890s ===
- January 2, 1890 – A tropical cyclone passed in between Vanuatu and New Caledonia.
- January 13, 1890 – A tropical cyclone impacted the Samoan island of Upolu.
- February 15, 1890 – A tropical cyclone impacted the Lau Islands.
- March 3, 1890 – A tropical cyclone impacted the southern Solomon Islands.
- March 4–5, 1890 – A tropical cyclone impacted New Caledonia.
- November 18, 1890 – A tropical cyclone impacted the Samoan island of Upolu.
- November 1890 – A tropical cyclone impacted the Cook Islands, where it killed 14 people on a ship and two canoes.
- December 15, 1890 – A tropical cyclone impacted French Polynesia's Austral Islands.
- December 24, 1890 – January 6, 1891 – A tropical cyclone impacted Fiji, after moving south-southwest from the Samoan Islands.
- January 26, 1891 – A tropical cyclone was located to the west of Tonga.
- February 1, 1891 – A tropical cyclone was located to the south of New Caledonia and to the west of Norfolk Island.
- February 10–11, 1891 – A tropical cyclone impacted Vanuatu and New Caledonia.
- February 18–19, 1891 – A tropical cyclone impacted Tuvalu, Fiji and Tonga.
- March 4–12, 1891 – A tropical cyclone impacted the Santa Cruz Islands of the Solmon Islands and Northern Vanuatu.
- December 24, 1891 – A tropical cyclone impacted Fiji.
- February 14–18, 1892 – A tropical cyclone caused significant damage to Vanuatu.
- December 18, 1892 – A tropical cyclone impacted Fiji.
- February 17, 1893 – A tropical cyclone moved westwards over the island of Futuna in Vanuatu.
- March 5–6, 1893 – A tropical cyclone impacted Vanuatu and New Caledonia.
- January 6–7, 1895 – A tropical cyclone impacted the east coast of Fiji's Vanua Levu and Viti Levu.
- January 3, 1896 – A tropical cyclone impacted Tonga.
- February 10–11, 1897 – A tropical cyclone impacted the Southern Cook Islands.
- January 30, 1898 – A tropical cyclone impacted New Caledonia.
- March 28–31, 1898 – A tropical cyclone existed to the south of New Caledonia.
- December 31, 1899 – January 2, 1900 – A tropical cyclone impacted Fiji before it later impacted Tonga.

== See also ==
- South Pacific tropical cyclone
- List of Australian region cyclones before 1900
- List of South-West Indian Ocean cyclones before 1900
