= 1737 Calcutta cyclone =

Tropical cyclone in the North Indian Ocean

Meteorological history
- Formed: 9 October 1737
- Dissipated: 13 October 1737

Super cyclonic storm
- 3-minute sustained (IMD)
- Highest winds: 260 km/h (160 mph)

Category 5-equivalent tropical cyclone
- 1-minute sustained (SSHWS)
- Highest winds: 270 km/h (165 mph)

Overall effects
- Fatalities: 300,000+
- Areas affected: Mughal Empire (modern day Bangladesh and West Bengal, India)
- Part of the 1737 North Indian Ocean cyclone season

The 1737 Calcutta cyclone, also known as the Hooghly River cyclone of 1737 or the Great Bengal cyclone of 1737, was the first super cyclone on record in the North Indian Ocean and is regarded as one of the worst natural disasters in Indian history. It hit the coast near Kolkata on the morning of 11 October 1737 and has been reported to have killed over 300,000 people in Calcutta, and caused widespread catastrophic damage. The cyclone hit land over the Ganges River Delta, just southwest of Calcutta. Most deaths resulted from the storm surge and happened on the sea: many ships sank in the Bay of Bengal and an unknown number of livestock and wild animals were killed from the effects of the cyclone. The damage was described as "extensive" but numerical statistics are unknown.

== Meteorological history ==
Based on inland observations that the cyclone's tidal effects were felt as far as 130 km (81 mi) inland south-southwest of Calcutta, the storm likely formed near the coast of Burma, supported by observations of ships passing in the area. The cyclone presumably moved northwest before turning northward, paralleling the coast of Calcutta between 10 and 11 October. The storm then began to slow down before turning north-northeastwards, making landfall over the Ganges River Delta, just south of Calcutta. It slowed down while crossing the West Bengal, entering modern-day Bangladesh on or by 13 October before being last noted that day, far to the north of Dacca.

=== The track ===
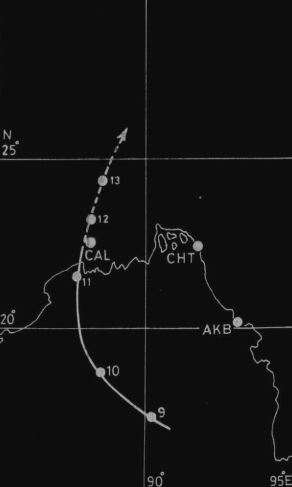
Presumed track of the 1737 Calcutta cyclone (as Illustrated by the track of the 1864 Calcutta cyclone that devastated comparable areas)

India Meteorological Department researchers conducted a study about the storm's track, finding similar storms that passed on or near Calcutta to cause similar damage and the same date when they passed. The 1864 Calcutta cyclone is an example they used, as the storm also had caused similar aftermath to the area nearly 127 years before. The full brunt of the 1864 storm was felt at Calcutta from 10:00 pm to 4:00 am (IST) on 4 and 5 October (14:30 pm to 20:30 pm, UTC). Meanwhile, the storm started to brush the coast of the area on "the night of October 11 and 12", presumably between the same time as the 1864 storm but using the date of the 1737 storm. Researchers then adjusted the landfall time of the 1737 storm to match the time where the residents inland experienced the storm's fury.

== Impact ==
The cyclone is regarded as one of India's worst natural disasters since reliable statistics began to be recorded.

Rain accumulation of the Ganges was estimated at 381 mm (15 in) over six hours. In his official report, Thomas Joshua Moore, the British East India Company duties collector, said that almost all the thatched buildings had been destroyed by the storm and flood. An estimated 3,000 inhabitants of the town have been killed.

A contemporary account of the cyclone, from the Gentleman's Magazine of London, stated that an earthquake had destroyed some 20,000 ships in the harbour and killed some 300,000 people. Given the population of Calcutta was 20,000 at the time, the 300,000 figure is either an error or, less probably, a figure relating to the whole of Bengal. Although there would appear to be little evidence for the widely reported figure of 300,000 deaths, or for an earthquake at all, this number shows up recurrently in popular literature. At the same time, the figure of 3,000 is only an estimation of the number of deaths inside the city itself.

Many cattle, tigers, and rhinoceroses were drowned in a storm surge with an estimated height of 10–13 meters (or 30–40 feet) from the storm and the "earthquake". Many crocodiles were also drowned by the strong river currents, and birds were plunged into the river by the winds, drowning them. Two 500-ton ships were thrown by large waves into a populated village, which further broke into pieces. Many people and cattle were killed. Two more ships of 60 tons were wrecked and found over the high grounds, destroying large trees. Eight out of nine ships were lost in the Ganges River and most of their crews drowned in the high seas. Three out of four Dutch ships also sank in the Ganges River and Bay of Bengal, respectively. The spire of the Govindaram temple was also destroyed by the cyclone.

In the aftermath of Cyclone Amphan on Kolkata, many people, including Chief Minister of West Bengal Mamata Banerjee compared the catastrophe of the storm to this cyclone due to its similar effects and impact.

== See also ==
- 1864 Calcutta cyclone - a deadly tropical cyclone that devastated the same area nearly 130 years after.
- 1970 Bhola cyclone - the deadliest tropical cyclone worldwide.
