= Claudia =

Claudia may refer to:

== People ==
=== Ancient Romans ===
- Any woman from the Roman Claudia gens
- Claudia (vestal), a Vestal Virgin who protected her father Appius Claudius Pulcher in 143 BC
- Claudia Acte
- Claudia Augusta (63–63 AD), infant daughter of Nero by his second wife
- Claudia Capitolina, princess of Commagene originally from Roman Egypt
- Claudia Marcella, women of the Claudii Marcelli
- Claudia Octavia (died 62 AD), first wife of Nero
- Claudia Procula, a name traditionally attributed to Pontius Pilate's wife
- Claudia Pulchra, a relative of the imperial family, accused of immorality and treason
- Claudia Rufina, a woman of British descent who lived in Rome c. 90 AD and was known to the poet Martial
- Claudia Quinta, who helped bring the statue of Cybele from Pessinus to Rome
- Claudia (sister of Publius Claudius Pulcher), 3rd-century BCE Roman woman convicted of treason.
- Claudia Tisamenis, sister of Herodes Atticus
- Saint Claudia, mentioned in 2 Timothy

=== Modern people ===
- Claudia (given name)

== Media ==
=== Television ===
- Claudia (American TV series)
- Claudia (telenovela), Mexican TV series
- "Claudia" (Criminal: Germany), a 2019 TV episode

=== Films ===
- Claudia (1943 film)
- Claudia (1959 film), an East German film
- Claudia/Jasmine, an Indonesian comedy drama film released in 2008

=== Music ===
- Claudia Quintet, an ensemble formed by drummer and composer John Hollenbeck
- Claudia Rossi, former drummer of Jack Off Jill known mononymously as Claudia

=== Other media ===
- Claudia (play), adapted into the aforementioned 1943 film
- Claudia and David (radio program), a 1940s radio program, sometimes referred to as simply Claudia
- Claudia (magazine), a Polish magazine published by Hubert Burda Media

== Other uses ==
- Ethinylestradiol/cyproterone acetate, a birth control pill sometimes sold under the brand name Claudia
- Claudia (gens), one of the most prominent patrician houses at Rome
- Claudia (crater), a crater on the asteroid 4 Vesta
- List of storms named Claudia

== See also ==
- Claudius (disambiguation)
- Claudias
- Cláudya (born 1948), Brazilian singer
