= Marcella =

Marcella is a Roman cognomen and Italian given name, the feminine version of Marcello (Mark in English). Marcella means warlike, martial, and strong. It could also mean 'young warrior'. The origin of the name Marcella is Latin.

Marcella may refer to:

== People ==
- Marcella of Marseille, 1st century legendary saint in the Roman Catholic Church
- Marcella of Rome (325–410), saint in the Roman Catholic Church and Eastern Orthodox Church
- Saint Markella, 14th century saint in the Greek Orthodox Church
- Nyomi Marcella (born 1981), American-born Indonesian adult actress
- Jade Marcella (born 1980), American-born Indonesia adult actress
- Claudia Marcella, women of the Marcelli branch of the Roman gens Claudia

=== As a given name ===
- Marcella Albani (1899–1959), Italian actress
- Marcella Alsan, American medical scientist and economist
- Marcella Althaus-Reid (1952–2009), Argentinian Methodist theologian and author
- Marcella Balconi (1919–1999), Italian child psychiatrist and member of the resistance
- Marcella Bella (born 1952), Italian singer
- Marcella Campagnano (born 1941), contemporary artist and Italian feminist photographer
- Marcella Daly (1901–1966), American film actress of the silent era
- Marcella Detroit (born 1952), American singer, musician, songwriter
- Marcella Filippi (born 1985), Italian basketball player
- Marcella Hazan (1924–2013), Italian-born American cookbook author
- Marcella Hempel (1915–2010), textile artist
- Markella Kavenagh, Australian actress
- Marcella Koek (born 1988), Dutch professional padel player
- Marcella LeBeau (1919–2021), Lakota elder, politician, nurse, and military veteran
- Marcella Lista, French curator and art historian
- Marcella Michelangeli (born 1943), Italian actress and singer
- Marcella Nunez-Smith, American physician
- Marcella Sherwood (c.1878– 1966), English missionary with the Church of England
- Marcella L. Williams, convicted murderer

== Arts and entertainment ==
- Marcella (play), a 1789 play by William Hayley
- Marcella (novel), an 1894 novel by Mary Augusta Ward
- Marcella (Giordano), a 1907 opera by Umberto Giordano
- Marcella (1921 film), an Italian film directed by Carmine Gallone
- Marcella (film), a 1937 Italian film directed by Guido Brignone
- "Marcella" (song), a 1972 song by the Beach Boys
- Marcella (album), a 1982 album by Marcella Detroit
- Marcella (TV series), a British Nordic-noir detective series

== Other uses ==
- Marcella, another term for piqué (weaving), a white cotton material used for evening shirts and waistcoats
- Marcella, Arkansas
- Marcella, Mississippi

== See also ==
- Marcellina (disambiguation)
