= List of storms named Claudia =

The name Claudia has been used for nine tropical cyclones worldwide: five in the East Pacific Ocean, three in the Australian region, and one in the South-West Indian Ocean. Additionally, Claudia has been used for one European windstorm.

In the East Pacific:

- Tropical Storm Claudia (1962) – crossed over the western portion of the Baja California peninsula, moved over water, and again struck the peninsula before dissipating
- Tropical Storm Claudia (1965) – never affected land
- Tropical Storm Claudia (1969) – downgraded to a depression only 24 hours after first becoming a tropical storm; did not make landfall
- Tropical Storm Claudia (1973) – made landfall approximately 30 mi (50 km) east of Acapulco; no deaths or casualties were reported
- Hurricane Claudia (1977) – did not make a landfall

In the Australian region:

- Cyclone Claudia (1982)
- Cyclone Claudia (2002) (14P) – did not make a landfall
- Cyclone Claudia (2020) – brought heavy rainfall to Darwin

In the South-West Indian:

- Cyclone Claudia (2012) – did not make a landfall

In Europe:

- Storm Claudia (2025) – a European windstorm that affected Britain, Ireland, Portugal and Spain in mid-November 2025
