= 1965 Atlantic hurricane season =

- Season summary map

Seasonal boundaries
- First system formed: June 13, 1965
- Last system dissipated: December 2, 1965

Strongest storm
- Name: Betsy
  - Maximum winds: 140 mph (220 km/h) (1-minute sustained)
  - Lowest pressure: 942 mbar (hPa; 27.82 inHg)

Seasonal statistics
- Total depressions: 13 (3 unofficial)
- Total storms: 10
- Hurricanes: 4
- Major hurricanes (Cat. 3+): 1
- Total fatalities: 76
- Total damage: $1.68 billion (1965 USD)

Related articles
- 1965 Pacific hurricane season; 1965 Pacific typhoon season; 1965 North Indian Ocean cyclone season

The 1965 Atlantic hurricane season was the first to use the modern-day bounds for an Atlantic hurricane season, which are June 1 to November 30. These dates conventionally delimit the period of each year when most tropical cyclones form in the Atlantic basin. It was a slightly below average season, with 10 tropical cyclones developing and reaching tropical storm intensity. Four of the storms strengthened into hurricanes. One system reached major hurricane intensity – Category 3 or higher on the Saffir–Simpson hurricane scale. The first system, an unnamed tropical storm, developed during the month of June in the southern Gulf of Mexico. The storm moved northward across Central America, but caused no known impact in the region. It struck the Florida Panhandle and caused minor impact across much of the Southern United States. Tropical cyclogenesis halted for over two months, until Anna formed on August 21. The storm remained well away from land in the far North Atlantic Ocean and caused no impact.

Hurricane Betsy was the strongest and most devastating storm of the season. Extensive damage from Betsy was reported in the Bahamas, Florida, and Louisiana, particularly the New Orleans area. It was the first hurricane in the history of the United States to result in at least $1 billion (1965 USD) in losses. Hurricane Carol meandered in the eastern Atlantic for over two weeks from mid-September to very early October. Impact on land from Carol was minimal. In late September, Tropical Storm Debbie developed in the northwestern Caribbean and moved slowly across the region, before later reaching the Gulf of Mexico. The storm dissipated just offshore of Louisiana, which resulted in only minor impact along the Gulf Coast of the United States. The final tropical cyclone, Hurricane Elena, formed on October 12. Elena remained at sea for nearly a week and caused no damage on land. Collectively, the storms of the 1965 Atlantic hurricane season caused 76 fatalities and $1.68 billion in damage, almost entirely due to Hurricane Betsy.

== Season summary ==
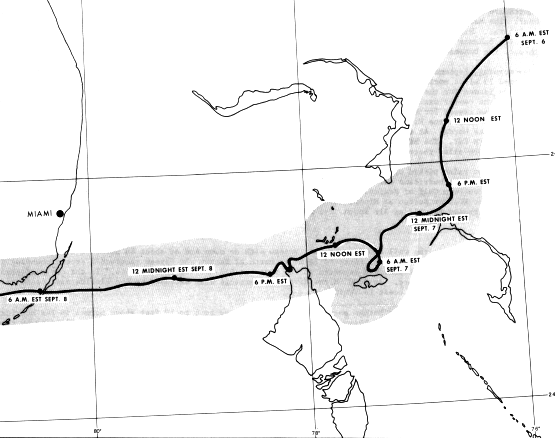
A close-up view of Hurricane Betsy's path through the Bahamas to the Florida Keys landfall

This was the first Atlantic hurricane season to start on June 1 and end on November 30, which is the modern-day season bounds. A total of 13 tropical depressions formed. Ten of those tropical depression intensified into a tropical storm, which was just slightly below the National Oceanic and Atmospheric Administration's 1950–2005 average of 11. Four of those tropical storms attained hurricane status, slightly below the average of six. One hurricane intensified into a major hurricane, which is Category 3 or greater on the Saffir–Simpson scale. This was slightly below the average of two per season. Overall, the tropical cyclones of this season collectively caused about $1.68 billion in damage and 76 deaths.

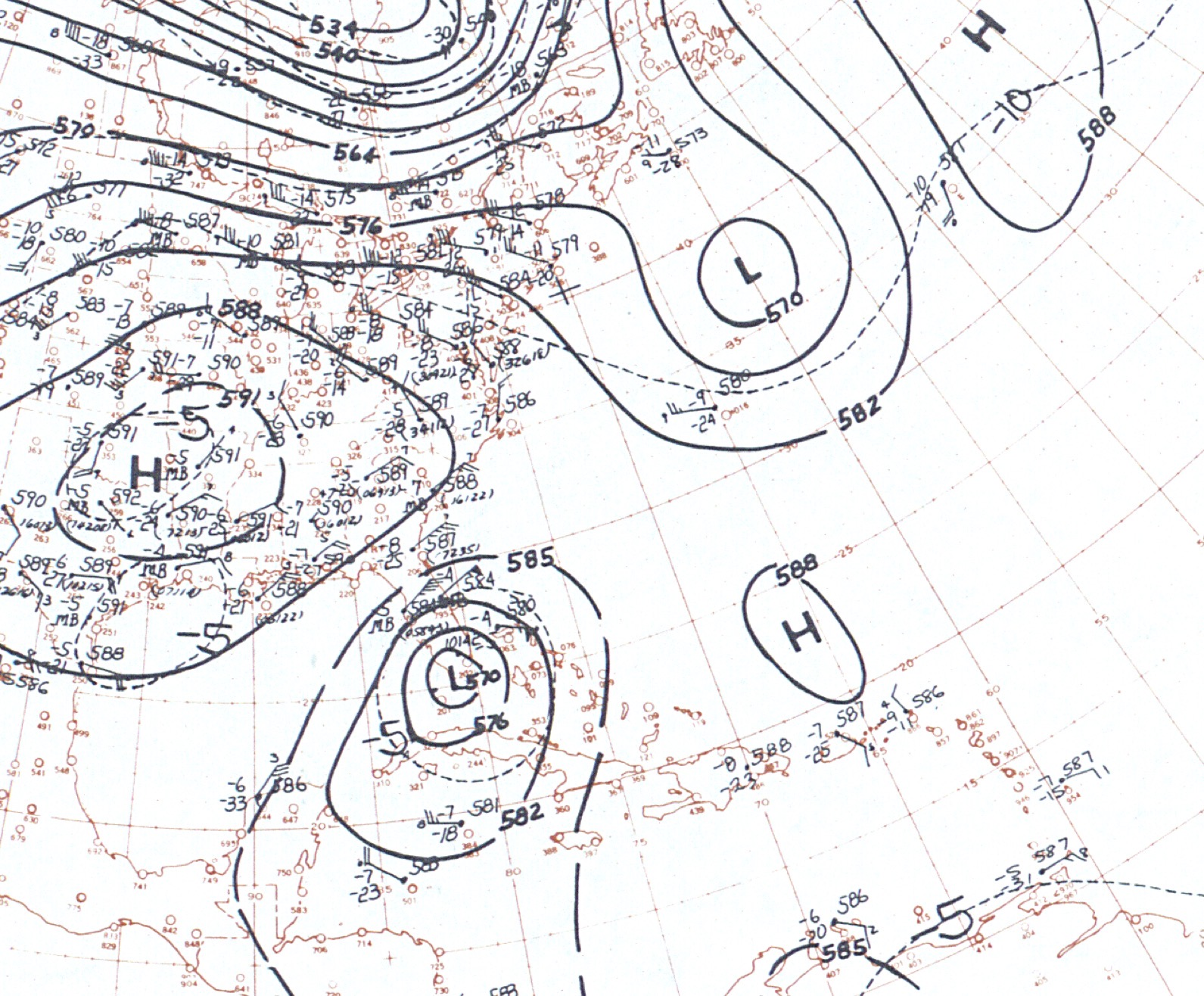
Weather map showing Hurricane Betsy (bottom left) and an unnamed tropical storm (top right) on September 8

Season activity began with the formation of an unnamed tropical storm over the southern Gulf of Mexico on June 13. There were no other tropical storms in the Atlantic basin until the latter part of August, when hurricanes Anna and Betsy formed. The latter developed on August 27 and eventually became the most intense tropical cyclone of the 1965 season, peaking as a Category 4 hurricane with maximum sustained winds of 140 mph (225 km/h) on September 2. While Betsy would mostly exist in September, the month also featured four additional tropical cyclones – an unnamed tropical storm, Hurricane Carol, a tropical depression, and then Debbie. In October, three tropical systems formed, including two unnamed tropical storms and Hurricane Elena. The final tropical cyclone of the 1965 season, an unnamed tropical storm, developed from a previously non-tropical cyclone northeast of the Lesser Antilles on November 29. The storm persisted into the month of December, before dissipating on December 2.

The season's activity was reflected with an accumulated cyclone energy (ACE) rating of 88, which was near the 1950–2005 average of 93.2. ACE is, broadly speaking, a measure of the power of the hurricane multiplied by the length of time it existed, so storms that last a long time, as well as particularly strong hurricanes, have high ACEs. It is only calculated for full advisories on tropical cyclones with winds exceeding 39 mph (63 km/h), which is tropical storm strength.

== Systems ==
=== June tropical storm ===
- Tropical storm (SSHWS)
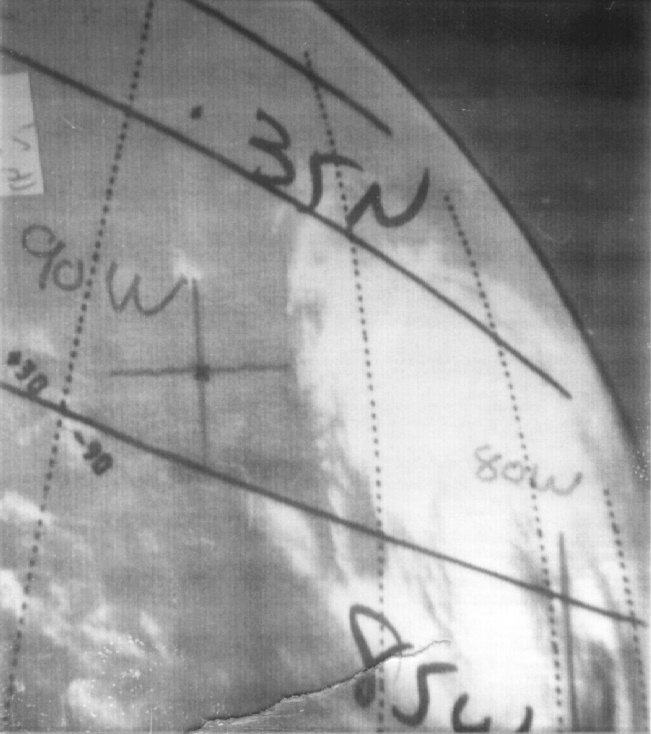
- Duration: June 13 – June 20
- Peak intensity: 60 mph (95 km/h) (1-min); 1005 mbar (hPa)

A cut-off low-pressure area developed from a shear trough in the northwestern Gulf of Mexico on June 9. The low caused the detachment of a disturbance from the Intertropical Convergence Zone, which was located near the south coast of Guatemala. After moving across Guatemala and Mexico, the low emerged into the Gulf of Mexico on June 13. The low intensified on the following day, reaching tropical storm status at 0600 UTC. It likely was a subtropical storm, however, the lack of consistent satellite data precludes such a classification. Operationally, the system was considered a tropical depression for its entire duration, thus, this went unnamed. The storm began curving northeastward, and by early on June 15, it peaked with winds of 60 mph (95 km/h).

At 1100 UTC on June 15, the storm made landfall near Santa Rosa Beach, Florida, at the same intensity. Inland, the storm continued northeastward and became extratropical over South Carolina at 0000 UTC on June 16. Tides along the coast of the Florida Panhandle were 3–4 feet (0.91–1.22 m) above normal. The storm brought sustained winds of 50 to 60 mph (85 to 105 km/h) with gusts up to 75 mph (120 km/h) at Alligator Point. Winds blew the roof off of two beach cottages on St. George Island, while tides sank or washed ashore several small boats. The storm also produced rainfall up to 8.75 inches (222 mm) in Wewahitchka. Slick roads in Tallahassee resulted in several car accidents, but no injuries occurred. The rains also left street flooding in the Inglewood neighborhood of Tallahassee, forcing the evacuation of two families. Two tornadoes were spawned in Florida, with one damaging houses and a mobile home in Live Oak. The storm also brought rainfall to several other states.

=== Hurricane Anna ===
- Category 2 hurricane (SSHWS)
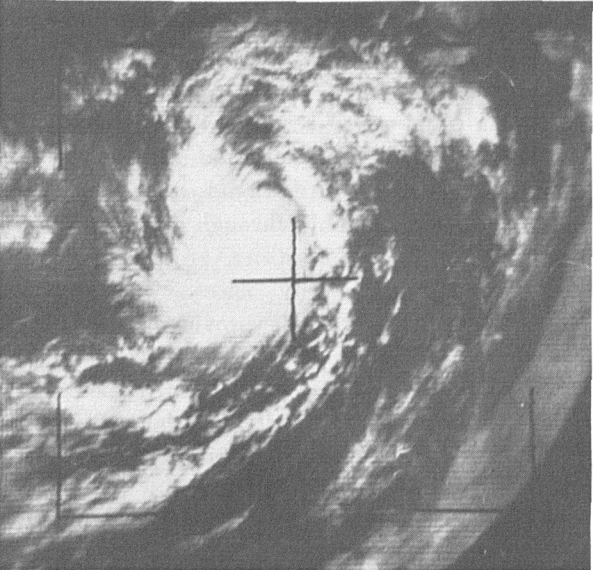
- Duration: August 21 – August 26
- Peak intensity: 105 mph (165 km/h) (1-min); 976 mbar (hPa)

A weak circulation was noted by Television Infrared Observation Satellite (TIROS) near Cape Verde on August 16. During the next five days, the system tracked west-northwestward or northwestward, while conditions gradually became favorable for tropical cyclogenesis. At 0600 UTC on August 21, it is estimated that the system became Tropical Storm Anna. While Anna was tracking north-northeastward on August 23, an eye feature appeared on TIROS. After another aircraft reported an eye on its radar, Anna was upgraded to a hurricane later that day. Early on August 24, Anna reached maximum sustained winds of 105 mph (170 km/h) while accelerating northeastward. Anna began losing tropical characteristics, and early on the following day, it transitioned into an extratropical storm while about halfway between the Azores and Greenland.

=== Hurricane Betsy ===
- Category 4 hurricane (SSHWS)
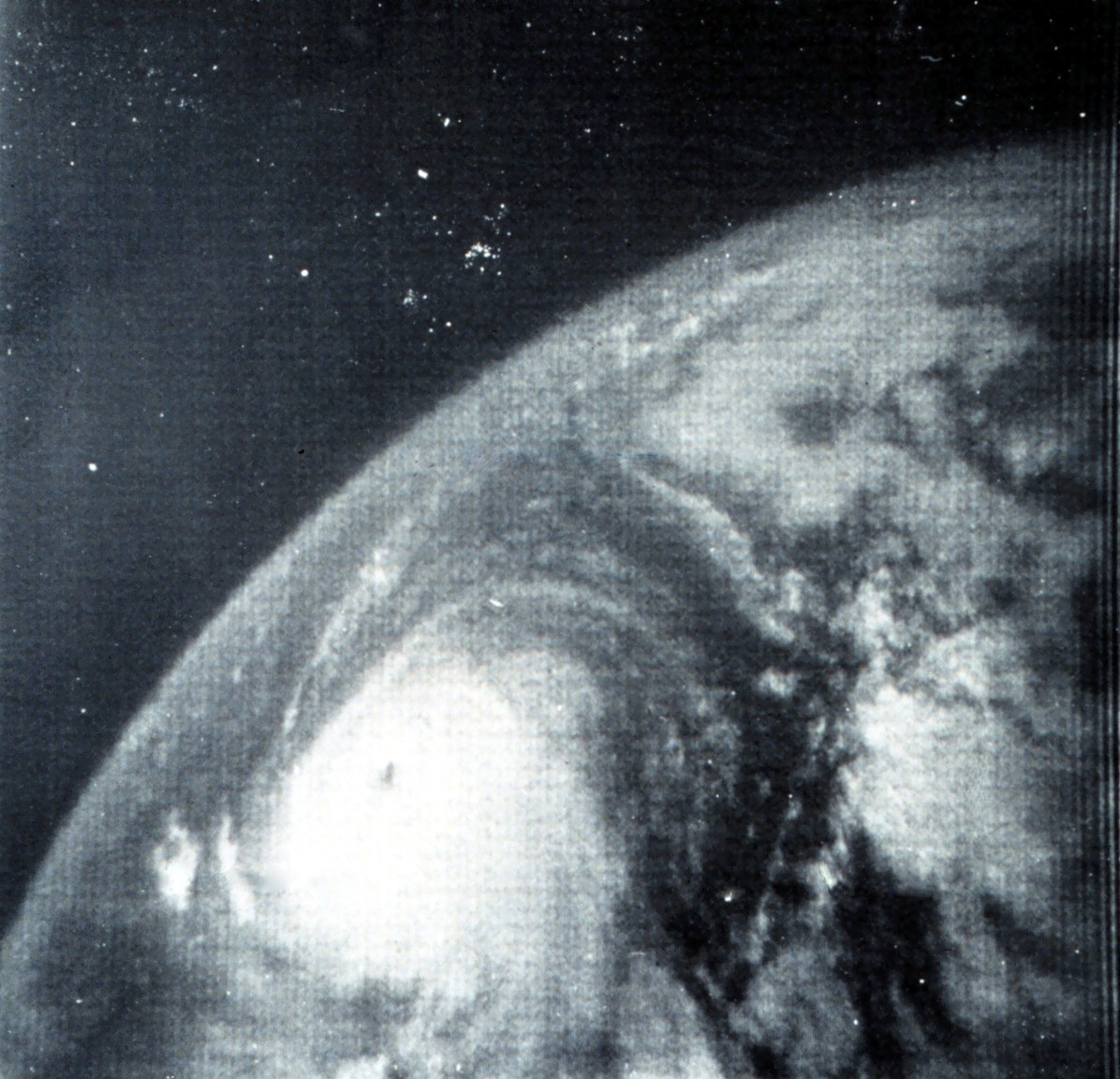
- Duration: August 27 – September 13
- Peak intensity: 140 mph (220 km/h) (1-min); 942 mbar (hPa)

A tropical disturbance developed into a tropical depression on August 27, while well east of the Windward Islands. It tracked generally west-northward until crossing the Leeward Islands on August 28. Early the next day, the depression intensified into Tropical Storm Betsy, shortly before striking Saint Martin and Anguilla. Betsy continued to intensify after re-emerging into the western Atlantic, becoming a hurricane on September 1. After executing a brief cyclonic loop, the storm then turned to the west. Later on September 1 and into September 2, Betsy rapidly intensified and peaked as a Category 4 hurricane with winds of 140 mph (225 km/h) on September 2. However, the storm fell back to Category 3 intensity early the next day. By September 5, Betsy executed another cyclonic loop northeast of the Bahamas and fell to as low as Category 1 intensity around 0000 UTC on September 6. The storm fluctuated between Category 2 and 3 as it headed southwestward and then westward over the next day, passing over or close to several Bahamian islands, including Great Abaco and Andros. The storm produced very strong winds and rough seas in the Bahamas, with a peak wind gust of 178 mph (286 km/h) at Hope Town. Betsy caused one fatality and approximately $14 million in damage in the island chain, mostly to agriculture and crops.

By early on September 8, Betsy made landfall near Tavernier, Florida, as a Category 3 hurricane. In South Florida, the storm brought strong winds and significant storm surge. Water reached several feet in height in upper Florida Keys, inundating highways and the first floor of buildings. Nearly all of the land south of Homestead Air Force Base and east of U.S. Route 1 was covered by water. There were 8 deaths and $120 million in losses, which included both property and agriculture. Betsy entered into the Gulf of Mexico later on September 8 and re-strengthened into a Category 4 hurricane on September 10, reaching a secondary peak with winds of 130 mph (210 km/h). However, further intensification was halted after Betsy made landfall in Grand Isle, Louisiana, around 0400 UTC. In Louisiana, strong winds and rough seas caused extensive damage. Storm surge inundated the levees in New Orleans, flooding much of the city. Throughout the state, more than 22,000 homes were either damaged or destroyed, and 168,000 people were left without electricity. The storm caused more than 17,000 injuries and resulted in 58 deaths. Damage in the state of Louisiana reached $1.2 billion. Once inland, the storm turned northeastward and rapidly weakened, becoming extratropical over Tennessee on September 11. Impact in other states ranged from minor to moderate. Overall, Betsy caused about $1.43 billion in damage and 76 fatalities. Betsy was the first hurricane in the United States to cause at least $1 billion in damage.

=== Early September tropical storm ===
- Tropical storm (SSHWS)
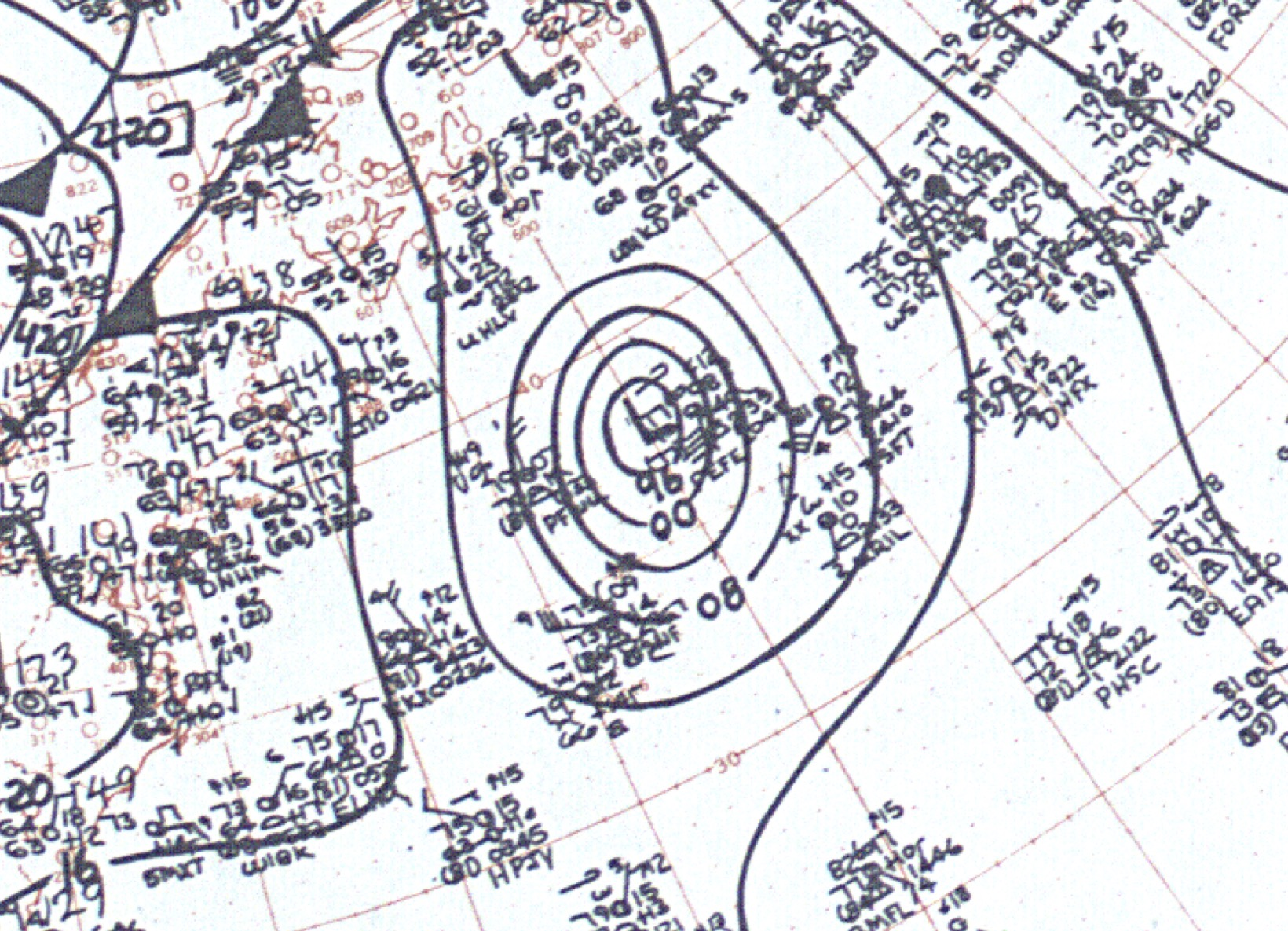
- Duration: September 4 – September 11
- Peak intensity: 60 mph (95 km/h) (1-min); 991 mbar (hPa)

A cold front moved eastward from North America into the western Atlantic Ocean on August 28. An extratropical low developed on August 31 over the north Atlantic, which degenerated into a trough three days later. On September 4, another extratropical storm developed, located about 800 mi (1,285 km) south of Newfoundland. The system attained gale-force winds a day later, and turned westward on September 6, steered by a building ridge to the north. On September 7, the storm transitioned into a tropical storm, after its wind field became more symmetrical. Later that day, the storm attain winds of 60 mph (95 km/h), recorded by nearby ships. The storm turned to the east and northeast, crossing over its former path. On September 10, the tropical storm again transitioned into an extratropical storm, which later passed southeast of Newfoundland. The storm moved across the northern Atlantic Ocean, dissipating on September 13 southwest of Ireland.

=== Hurricane Carol ===
- Category 1 hurricane (SSHWS)
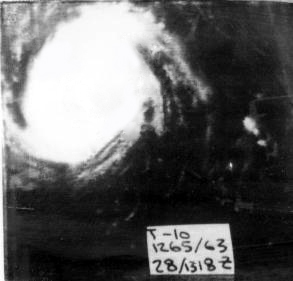
- Duration: September 15 – October 1
- Peak intensity: 90 mph (150 km/h) (1-min); 974 mbar (hPa)

A tropical wave emerged into the Atlantic from the west coast of Africa on September 15, and developed into a tropical depression by early on the following day. It headed steadily westward and strengthened into Tropical Storm Carol late on September 17. The storm began curving northwestward by the following day. Operationally, advisories were not initiated until 1900 UTC on September 19, after winds had already reached 50 mph (80 km/h). Carol then slowed and began turning north-northward. Later on September 20, a Navy reconnaissance flight confirmed a circulation and also measured hurricane-force winds. Thus, Carol was upgraded to a hurricane at 1800 UTC on September 20.

On September 21, another flight into the storm recorded a minimum pressure of 974 mbar (28.8 inHg), the lowest in relation to Carol. The hurricane accelerated, before slowing in forward motion on September 22. Between September 24 and September 28, the storm drifted and executed a small cyclonic loop and fluctuating from tropical storm status to Category 1 intensity and back to tropical storm strengthen during that time. After turning northeastward, Carol re-intensified into a hurricane on September 25. While passing northwest of the Azores, a weather station on Corvo Island reported a sustained wind speed of 64 mph (103 km/h) and a gust up to 80 mph (130 km/h). The storm curved east-southeastward, weakened, and transitioned into an extratropical cyclone while located north of the Azores on September 30. The remnants of Carol turned southeastward and then southward before dissipating near the Canary Islands on October 3.

=== Tropical Storm Debbie ===
- Tropical storm (SSHWS)
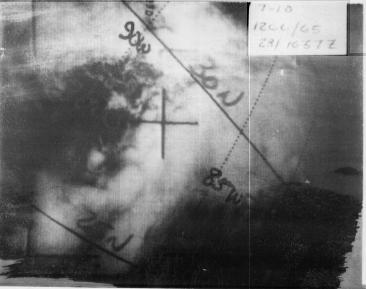
- Duration: September 24 – September 30
- Peak intensity: 60 mph (95 km/h) (1-min); 1000 mbar (hPa)

A low-pressure area developed into a weak tropical depression on September 24 off the north coast of Honduras in the western Caribbean Sea. It was initially disorganized, without a well-developed circulation. On September 25, while still a tropical depression, the system was named Debbie. Without intensifying further, the depression crossed the northeastern Yucatán Peninsula on September 26. The next day, the depression turned toward the north in the central Gulf of Mexico before beginning a northeast motion. On September 28, Debbie intensified into a tropical storm, attaining peak winds of 50 mph (85 km/h). This occurred after the storm developed two distinct spiral rainbands. As Debbie approached the northern Gulf Coast, it failed to intensify, despite warm sea surface temperatures, abundant moisture, and an anticyclone aloft. In addition, the storm never developed good outflow, partially due to stable air related to Tropical Storm Hazel in the eastern Pacific Ocean. After maintaining peak winds for about 12 hours, Debbie weakened due to cooler, drier air, deteriorating to a tropical depression on September 29. That day, it turned to the northwest, passing just east of the Mississippi Delta. On September 30, the circulation of Debbie dissipated just offshore Mississippi. Its remnants made landfall, accelerated northeastward, and were eventually absorbed by an extratropical cyclone.

The precursor to Debbie produced heavy rainfall across the western Caribbean Sea. Swan Island off the north coast of Honduras reported 5.43 in (138 mm) in a 24-hour period. In Belize City, Belize, the storm produced high tides and 1.04 in (26 mm) of rainfall. Grand Cayman reported light rains for two days. Along the gulf coast of the United States, the threat of the storm prompted the evacuation of oil platforms, as well as thousands of residents in low-lying areas of St. Bernard Parish, Louisiana. In New Orleans, storm tides reached 6 ft (1.8 m). High tides inundated roads and highways in southeastern Louisiana. The storm affected areas that were severely damaged by Hurricane Betsy earlier in September. Despite being a weak storm, Debbie dropped heavy rainfall along the coast, peaking at 17.2 in (440 mm) in Mobile, Alabama. Of the total, 15 in (380 mm) fell in 15 hours, which broke the daily rainfall record in the city. The rains resulted in 6 ft (1.8 m) of flooding that closed several businesses and roads, causing the worst traffic jam on record in the city. Hundreds of cars were flooded, and more than 200 people had to leave their inundated homes. Damage in the city was estimated at $25 million, which was the only significant damage from the storm. Rainfall extended from Louisiana to the east coast of Florida, and as far north as North Carolina. In eastern Georgia near Brunswick, the storm dropped more than 9 in (230 mm) of precipitation, causing flooding in airfields and along canals.

=== Late September tropical storm ===
- Tropical storm (SSHWS)
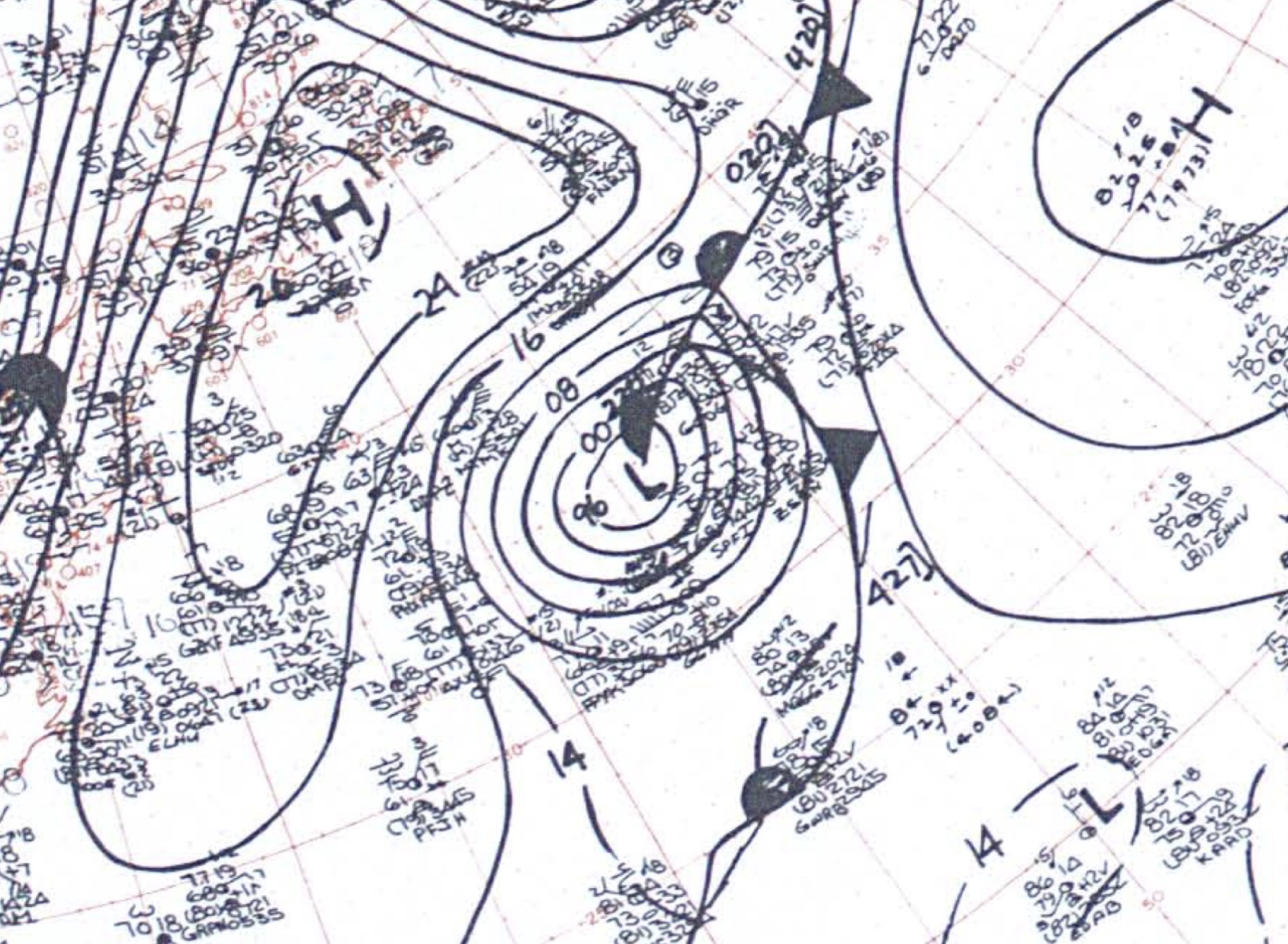
- Duration: September 29 – October 3
- Peak intensity: 60 mph (95 km/h) (1-min); 993 mbar (hPa)

On September 25, a cold front emerged into the western Atlantic Ocean and stalled. An extratropical storm developed along the front on September 29 to the southeast of the Carolinas. The storm moved quickly east-northeastward and quickly intensified to near hurricane intensity. On September 30, the storm passed north of Bermuda, producing winds of 40 mph (65 km/h) there. On October 1, the system reversed its track, weakened slightly, and became more symmetric. By October 2, the strongest winds were located near the circulation center, based on nearby ship reports. Based on the observations, the Atlantic hurricane reanalysis project estimated that the system transitioned into a tropical storm on this day, although the storm could have been a subtropical cyclone. Around that time, maximum sustained winds were estimated at 60 mph (95 km/h). The storm moved to the north and northeast ahead of a cold front. On October 3, the front absorbed the storm.

=== Hurricane Elena ===
- Category 2 hurricane (SSHWS)
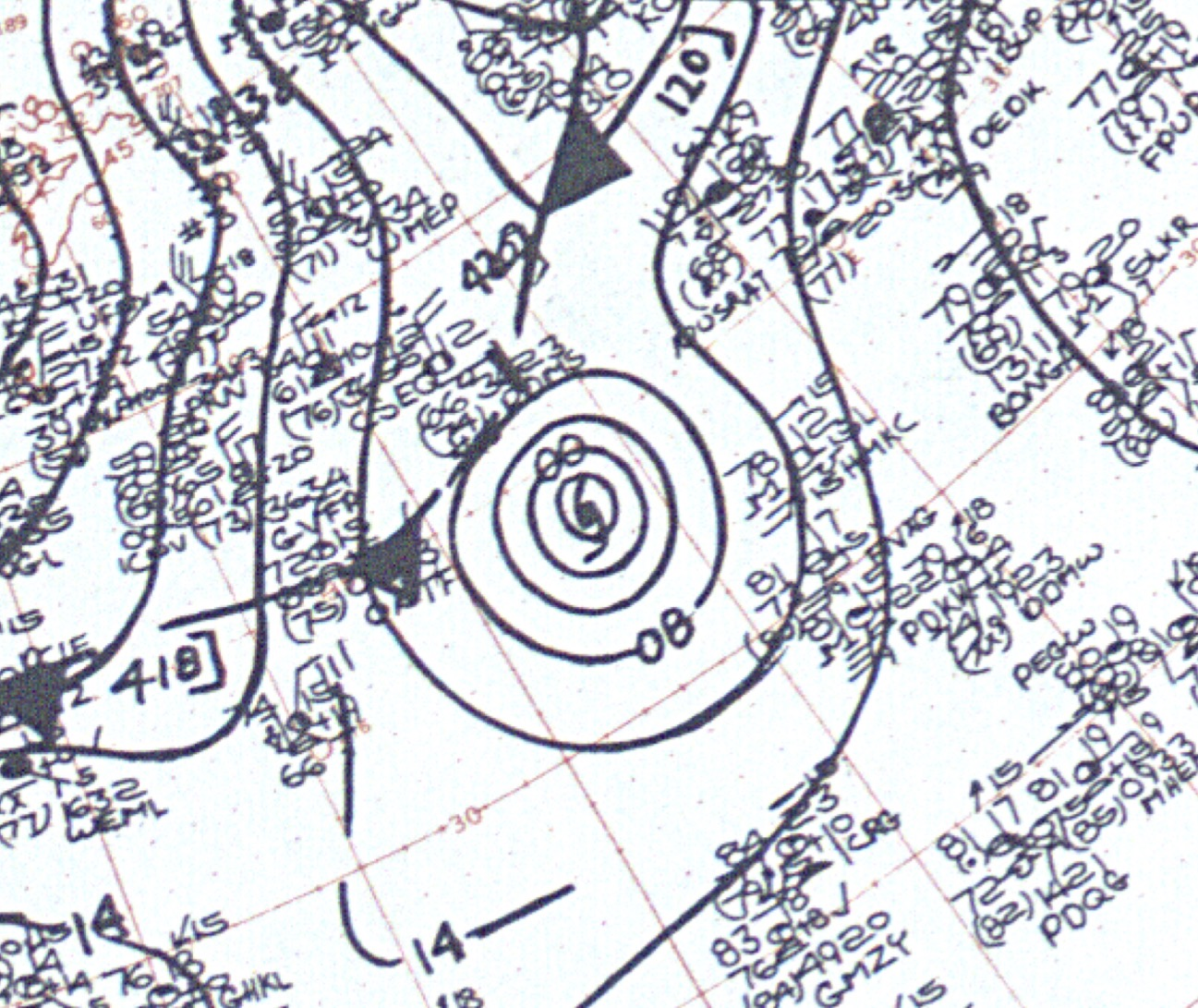
- Duration: October 13 – October 20
- Peak intensity: 110 mph (175 km/h) (1-min); 977 mbar (hPa)

TIROS imagery indicated a very weak circulation near 12°N, 40°W on October 11. Ship reports on the following day indicated a somewhat more organized circulation. As a result, it is estimated that the final tropical depression of the season at 1200 UTC on October 12, while located about midway between Cape Verde and the Leeward Islands. Initially, the depression remained disorganized while tracking northwestward. However, by early on October 14, the depression strengthened into Tropical Storm Elena. The storm continued to intensify as it headed northwestward, before turning to the northeast late on October 16. Elena became a Category 1 hurricane at 1200 UTC on October 17 and then reached Category 2 status early the next day. Around 1200 UTC, Elena attained its peak intensity with maximum sustained winds of 110 mph (175 km/h) and a minimum barometric pressure of 977 mbar (28.9 inHg). At 0600 UTC on October 19, the storm merged with an approaching cold front near the Azores. The remnants moved rapidly north-northeastward until dissipating near Iceland on October 20.

=== October tropical storm ===
- Tropical storm (SSHWS)
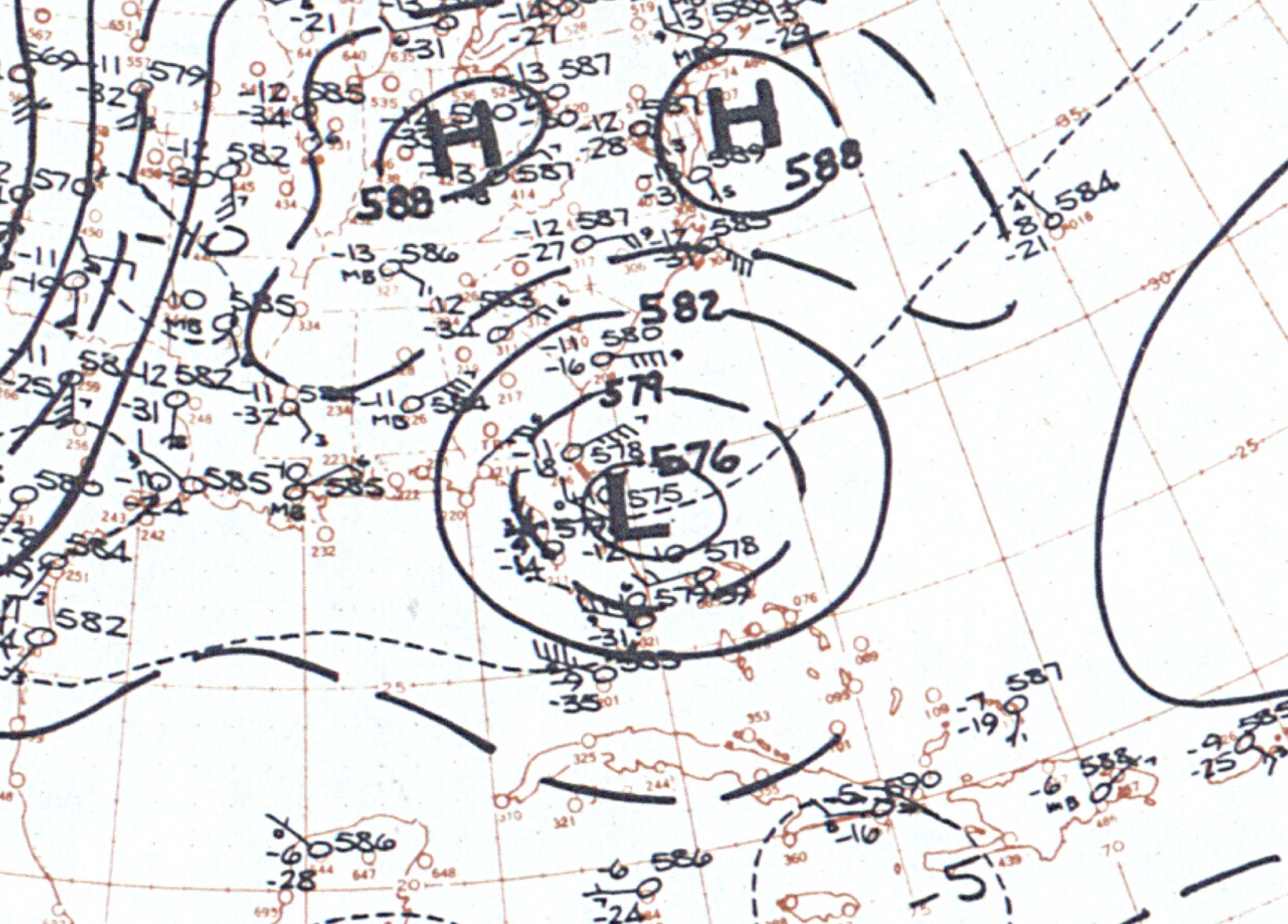
- Duration: October 16 – October 19
- Peak intensity: 65 mph (100 km/h) (1-min); 1004 mbar (hPa)

A trough persisted along the southeastern United States on October 15. A day later, a tropical depression formed along the trough near the northwestern Bahamas. The system quickly intensified into a tropical storm; due to its large circulation, the storm was potentially a subtropical cyclone. The storm moved in a counterclockwise direction – southeast at first, and eventually curving to the west-southwest. On October 18, the hurricane hunters flight reported maximum sustained winds of 65 mph (105 km/h). At 15:00 UTC that day, the storm made landfall at peak intensity near Flagler Beach, Florida. It quickly weakened while crossing the state, and dissipated the next day in the eastern Gulf of Mexico. The storm, in conjunction with a high-pressure system over New England, produced gale-force winds in the Carolinas.

The precursor trough associated with this cyclone dropped heavy rainfall over the Miami metropolitan area. The Bahia Mar marina in Fort Lauderdale recorded 25.28 in (642 mm) of precipitation, while at least 10 in (250 mm) of rain fell in a roughly triangular-shaped area bounded by Loxahatchee, West Palm Beach, and Hollywood. Floodwaters inundated and damaged many roads throughout southeast Florida. An estimated 75% of crops in eastern Palm Beach County were lost, equivalent to approximately $4.5 million in damage. After the system became a tropical storm and approached the coast of Florida, storm gale warnings were issued from Cape Kennedy, Florida, to Cape Hatteras, North Carolina. Wind gusts close to 50 mph (80 km/h) were recorded near Jacksonville. The storm caused several power outages in the Jacksonville area but left little damage.

=== November tropical storm ===
- Tropical storm (SSHWS)
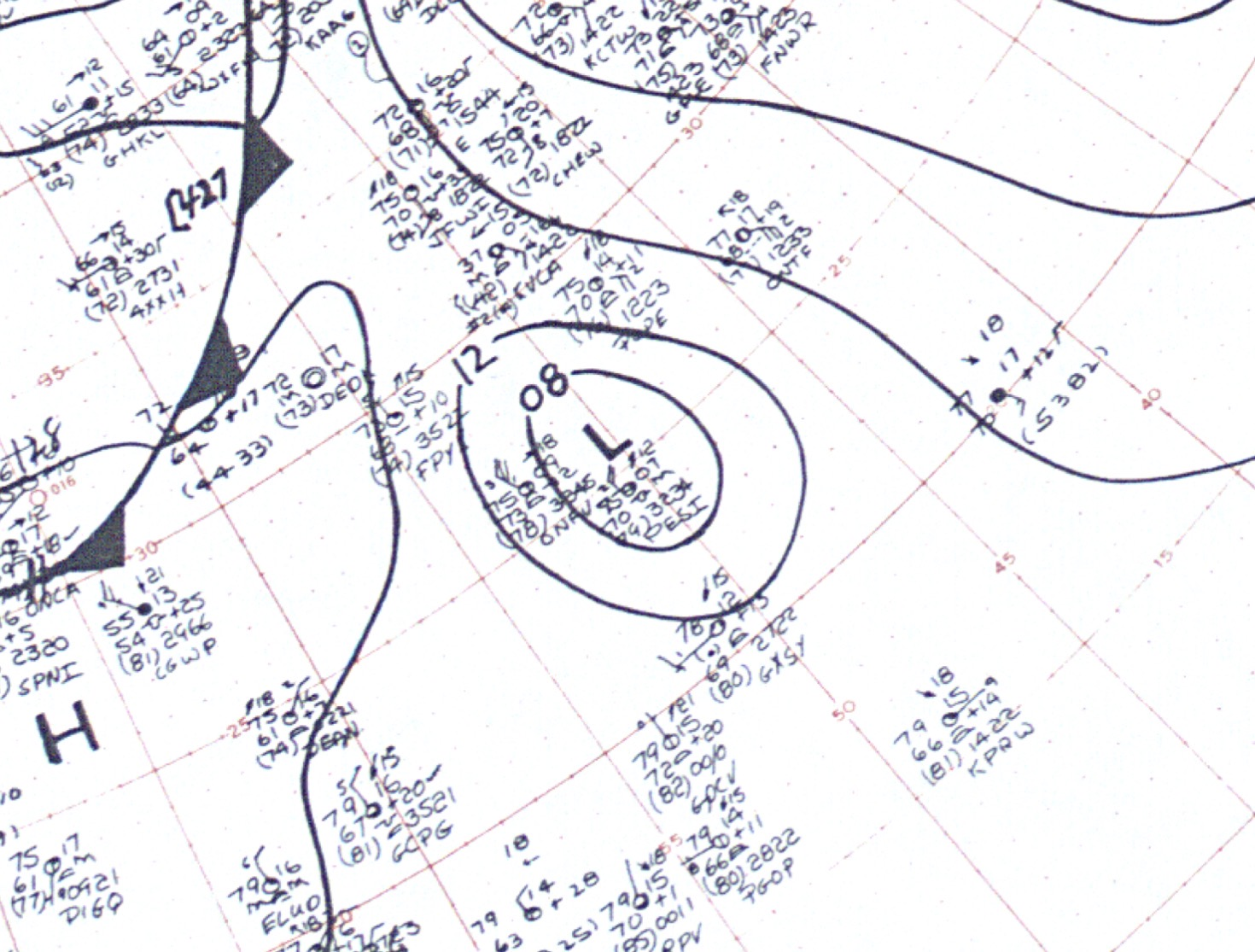
- Duration: November 26 – December 2
- Peak intensity: 50 mph (85 km/h) (1-min); 999 mbar (hPa)

A cold front exited the east coast of the United States on November 22, and moved eastward. An extratropical storm developed along the front on November 26, located northeast of the Lesser Antilles. The storm moved northeastward, executed a small loop, and strengthened slightly. Gradually, the storm's structure became more symmetrical, and by November 29, the system transitioned into a tropical storm. At that time, the storm had peak winds of 50 mph (80 km/h), and was moving southward. On December 1, the storm weakened into a tropical depression, and on the same day, the track shifted to the west. On December 2, the depression dissipated.

== Other systems ==
A trough of low pressure reached the central Gulf of Mexico by June 10. The trough spawned a low-pressure area, which became a tropical depression on June 11. The depression moved northwestward and struck Mississippi before dissipating on the following day.

A tropical wave approached the Leeward Islands on August 6. Two days later, a ship just east of the islands reported winds of 35 mph (55 km/h) about 35 mi (55 km) away from the center of the tropical wave, indicating the presence of a closed circulation, and thus, a tropical depression formed. The depression emerged into the eastern Caribbean and then quickly dissipated.

On September 21, an extratropical low-pressure area developed at the tail-end of a cold front over the west-central Atlantic. The low gradually lost frontal characteristics and acquired a more symmetrical structure, becoming a tropical depression just north of Bermuda on September 24. Curving northeastward, the depression transitioned into an extratropical cyclone on September 26 and a different cold front absorbed it by the next day.

== Storm names ==
The following list of names was used for named storms (tropical storms and hurricanes) that formed in the North Atlantic in 1965. This was the same list used for the 1961 season, except for Carol, Elena, and Holly, which replaced Carla, Esther and Hattie, respectively. A storm was named Elena for the first time in 1965.

- Anna
- Betsy
- Carol
- Debbie
- Elena
- Frances (unused)
- Gerda (unused)
- Holly (unused)
- Inga (unused)
- Jenny (unused)
- Kara (unused)
- Laurie (unused)
- Martha (unused)
- Netty (unused)
- Orva (unused)
- Peggy (unused)
- Rhoda (unused)
- Sadie (unused)
- Tanya (unused)
- Virgy (unused)
- Wenda (unused)

=== Retirement ===
The name Betsy was retired following the season due to the storm's extent and severity of impacts. Also, the name Carol, used after a 10-year hiatus from the naming list on account of Hurricane Carol in 1954, was permanently retired in the spring of 1969. They were replaced with Blanche and Camille for use in the 1969 season.

== Season effects ==
This is a table of all of the storms that formed in the 1965 Atlantic hurricane season. It includes their name, duration, peak classification and intensities, areas affected, damage, and death totals. Deaths in parentheses are additional and indirect (an example of an indirect death would be a traffic accident), but were still related to that storm. Damage and deaths include totals while the storm was extratropical, a wave, or a low, and all of the damage figures are in 1965 USD.

Saffir–Simpson scale
| TD | TS | C1 | C2 | C3 | C4 | C5 |

1965 Atlantic hurricane season statistics
| Storm name | Dates active | Storm category at peak intensity | Max 1-min wind mph (km/h) | Min. press. (mbar) | Areas affected | Damage (US$) | Deaths | Ref(s). |
|---|---|---|---|---|---|---|---|---|
| Unnamed | June 13–20 | Tropical storm | 50 (85) | 1005 | Guatemala, Mexico, Southeastern United States | Minimal | None | |
| Anna | August 21–26 | Category 2 hurricane | 105 (165) | 976 | None | None | None | |
| Betsy | August 27 – September 12 | Category 4 hurricane | 140 (220) | 942 | Lesser Antilles, The Bahamas, United States Gulf Coast, Eastern United States | $1.43 billion | 76 | |
| Unnamed | September 4–11 | Tropical storm | 60 (95) | 991 | None | None | None | |
| Carol | September 15 – October 1 | Category 1 hurricane | 90 (150) | 974 | Azores | None | None | |
| Debbie | September 24–30 | Tropical storm | 60 (95) | 993 | Honduras, Mexico, United States Gulf Coast | $25 million | None | |
| Unnamed | September 29 – October 3 | Tropical storm | 60 (95) | 993 | None | None | None | |
| Elena | October 13–20 | Category 2 hurricane | 110 (175) | 977 | None | None | None | |
| Unnamed | October 16–19 | Tropical storm | 65 (100) | 1004 | The Bahamas, Florida | Unknown | None | |
| Unnamed | November 26 – December 2 | Tropical storm | 50 (85) | 999 | None | None | None | |
Season aggregates
| 10 systems | June 13 – December 2 | | 140 (220) | 942 | | $1.68 billion | 76 | |

== See also ==
- 1965 Pacific hurricane season
- 1965 Pacific typhoon season
- Australian cyclone seasons: 1964–65, 1965–66
- South Pacific cyclone seasons: 1964–65, 1965–66
- South-West Indian Ocean cyclone seasons: 1964–65, 1965–66
