= Marcellina =

Marcellina may refer to:

== People ==
- Marcellina (gnostic), a second-century Carpocratian Christian leader in Rome
- Saint Marcellina, a fourth-century Christian saint
- Marcellina Emmanuel, a Tanzanian middle-distance runner
- Marcellina Darowska, a beatified Polish nun

== Other ==
- Marcellina (municipality), a municipality in Rome
- Marcellina Mountain, a mountain summit in the Rocky Mountains
- Marcellina, a character in the opera the Marriage of Figaro

== See also ==
- Marcella (disambiguation)
- Marcelina, a genus of moths
