= Claudia (crater) =

Small crater used for prime meridian on 4 Vesta

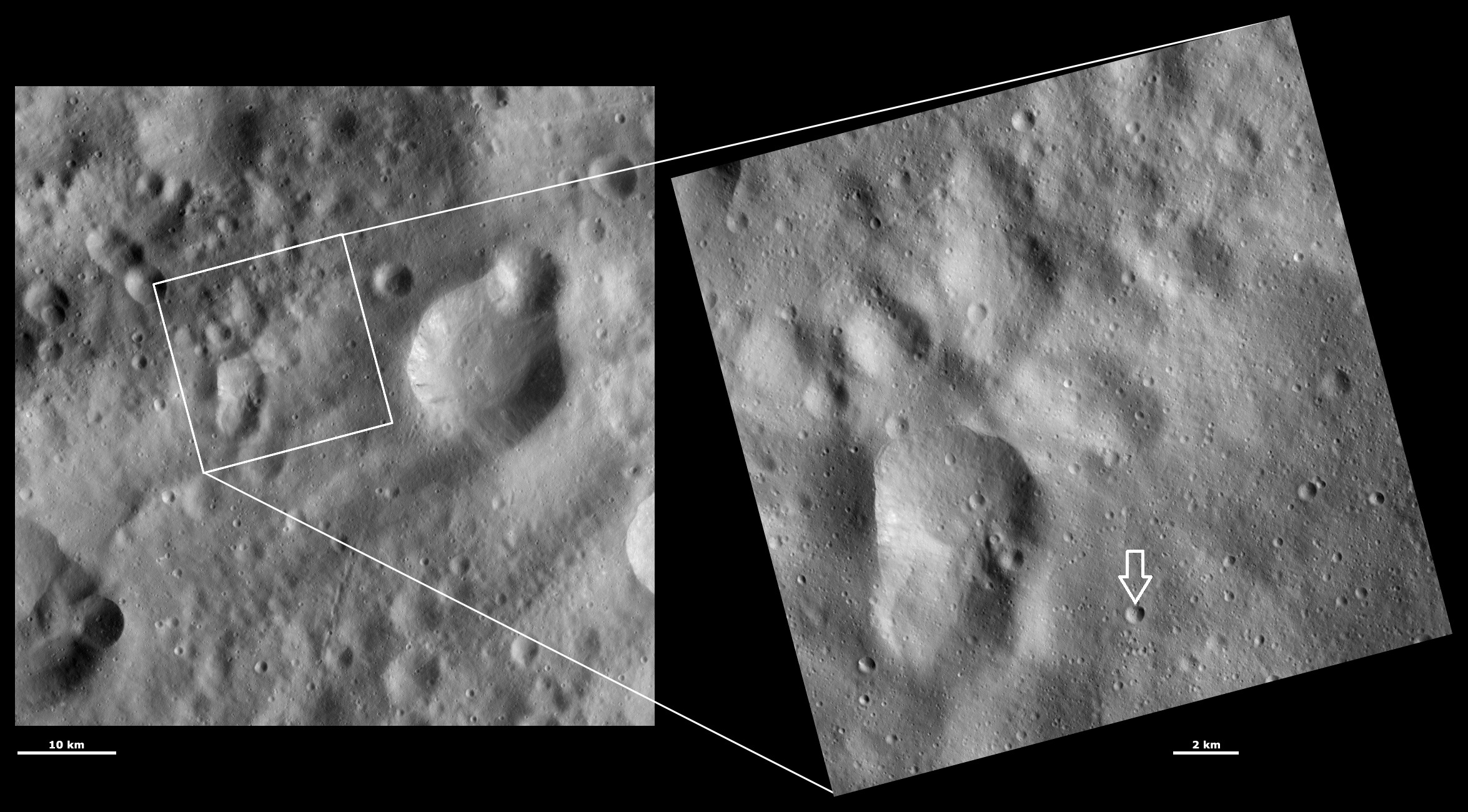
- Claudia crater (arrow, image at right) in an image of Vesta taken by Dawn at an altitude of 272 km, shown in the context of the image at left taken from 700 km
- Feature type: Impact crater
- Location: Vesta
- Coordinates: 1°39′S 146°0′E (Note: Given in the Planetary Data System coordinate system, rather than the Claudia coordinate system.)
- Diameter: ~650–700 m
- Discoverer: Dawn
- Eponym: Claudia

Claudia is a small crater that formerly defined the prime meridian of the asteroid 4 Vesta. (Note: In the Claudia coordinate system, Claudia is defined at the 356°E/4°W meridian whence Vesta's prime meridian is anchored to.) The convention of defining Vesta's prime meridian from Claudia is informally referred to as the Claudia coordinate system. The crater was named after the Roman Vestal Virgin Claudia by the Dawn mission team; the name Claudia was officially approved by the IAU on 30 September 2011.

Claudia was chosen because it is small, sharply defined, easy to find, and near the equator. The prime meridian runs 4° to the west. This results in a more logical set of mapping quadrants than the IAU coordinate system, which drifts over time due to an error in calculating the position of the pole, and is based on the 200 km Olbers Regio, which is so poorly defined that it is not even visible to the Dawn spacecraft.

The Claudia coordinate system was the coordinate system used by the Dawn mission team, NASA, and the International Astronomical Union's Gazetteer of Planetary Nomenclature (GPN). However, the Claudia coordinate system has since been superseded by the Claudia Double-Prime system (also called the Planetary Data coordinate system), where Claudia is defined at the 146°E. The Claudia Double-Prime system is therefore offset 150° east from the Claudia coordinate system .
