= 1965 Pacific hurricane season =

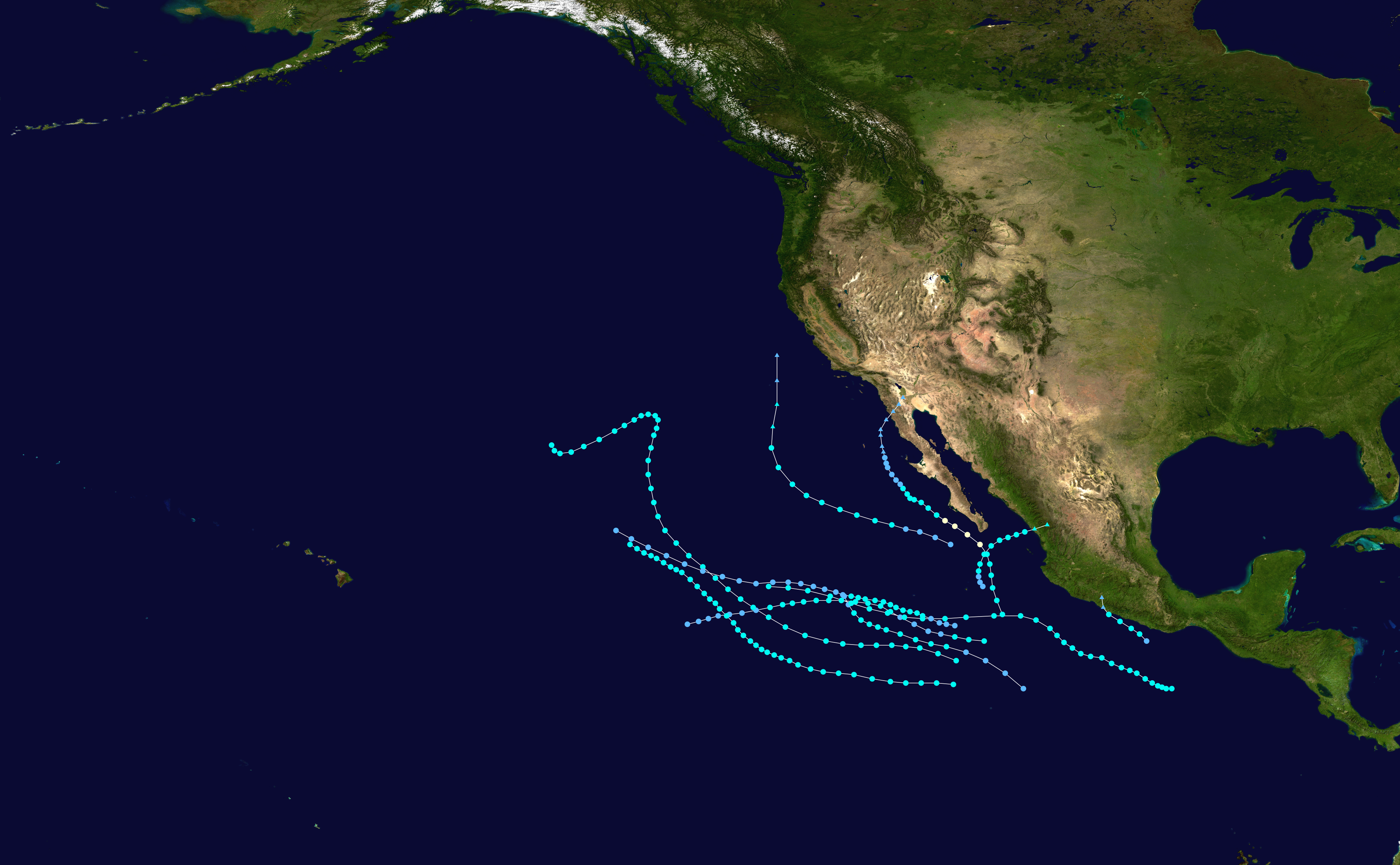
- Season summary map

Seasonal boundaries
- First system formed: June 4, 1965
- Last system dissipated: September 27, 1965

Strongest storm
- Name: Emily
  - Maximum winds: 90 mph (150 km/h) (1-minute sustained)
  - Lowest pressure: 980 mbar (hPa; 28.94 inHg)

Seasonal statistics
- Total depressions: 11
- Total storms: 10
- Hurricanes: 1
- Major hurricanes (Cat. 3+): 0
- Total fatalities: 6 total
- Total damage: $10 million (1965 USD)

Related articles
- 1965 Atlantic hurricane season; 1965 Pacific typhoon season; 1965 North Indian Ocean cyclone season

The 1965 Pacific hurricane season officially started May 15, 1965, in the eastern Pacific, and June 1, 1965, in the central Pacific, and lasted until November 30, 1965. These dates conventionally delimit the period of each year when most tropical cyclones form in the northeast Pacific Ocean. A total of ten systems were observed. The most notable storm was Tropical Storm Hazel, which killed six people in Mexico.

== Systems ==
=== Tropical Storm Victoria ===
- Tropical storm (SSHWS)
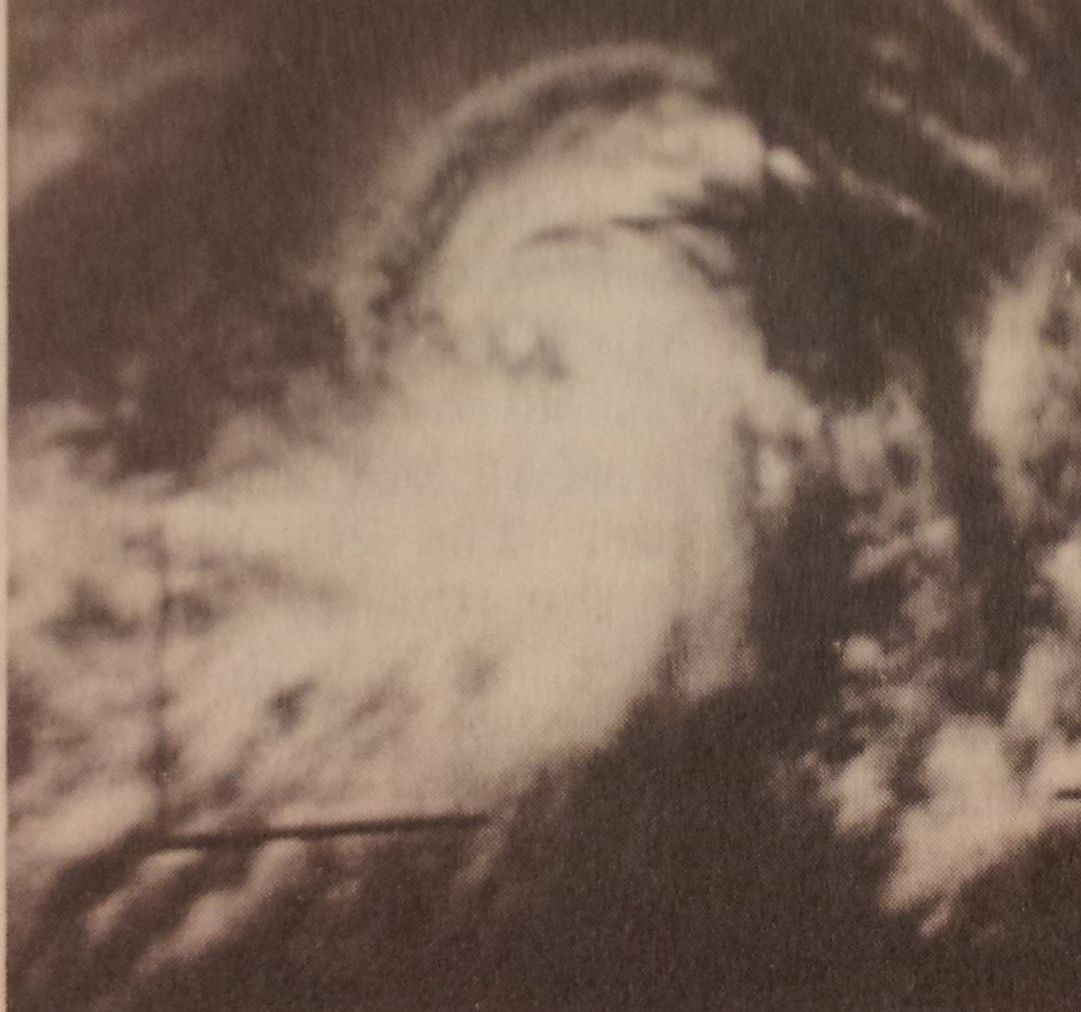
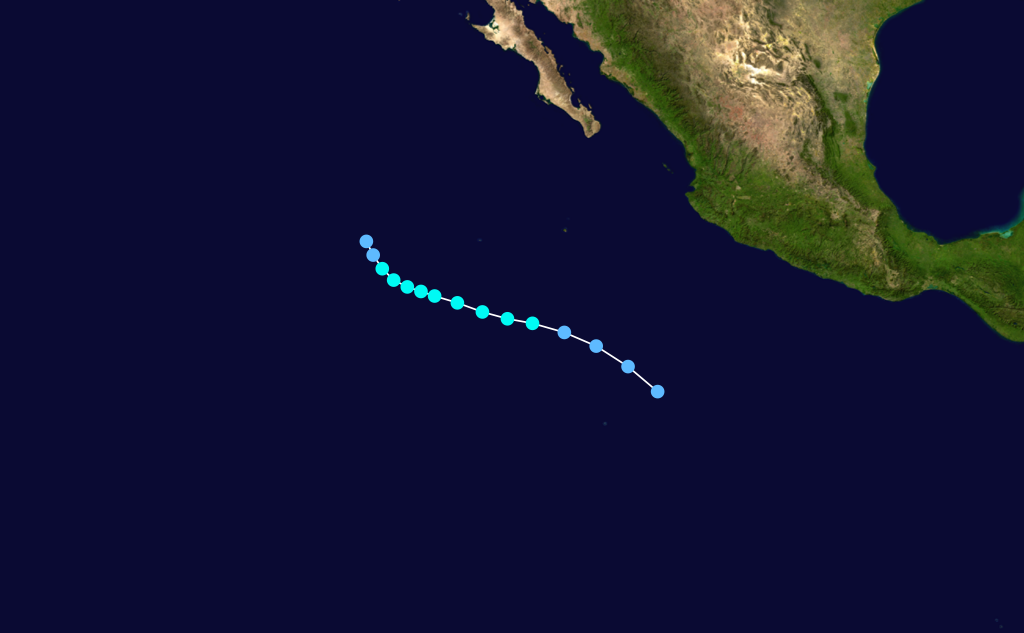
- Duration: June 4 – June 7
- Peak intensity: 85 km/h (50 mph) (1-min); 1005 hPa (mbar)

On June 4, a tropical depression formed 585 miles (941 km) southwest of Acapulco, Mexico Early the next day, the depression system intensified into the first tropical storm of the season and was named Victoria. At that time, the storm was at its peak intensity of 50 mph (80 km/h) which it retained while moving the northwest. Early on June 7, the tropical storm weakened into a tropical depression before dissipating six hours later. In all, Tropical Storm Victoria stayed at sea.

=== Tropical Storm Wallie ===
- Tropical storm (SSHWS)
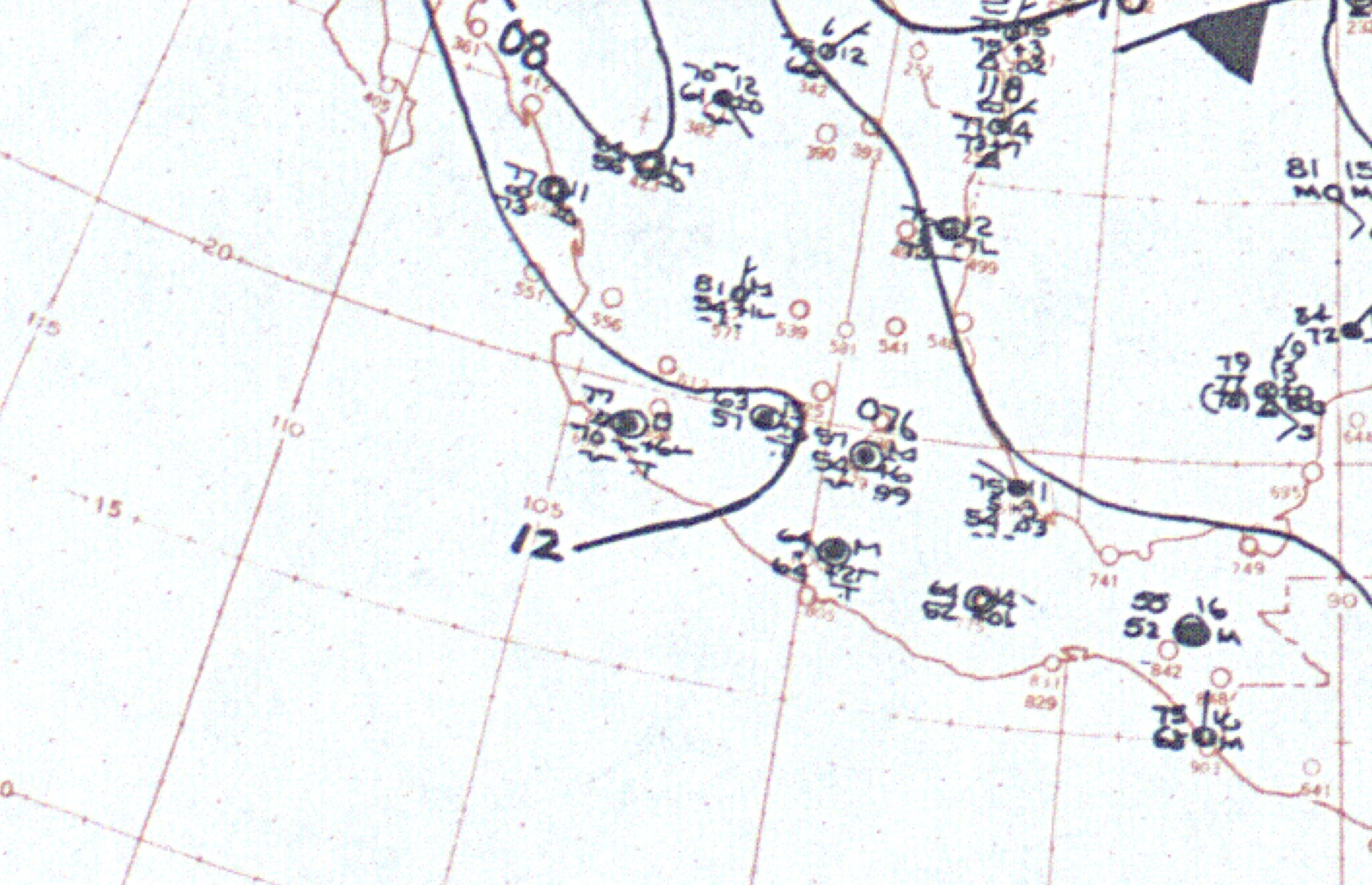
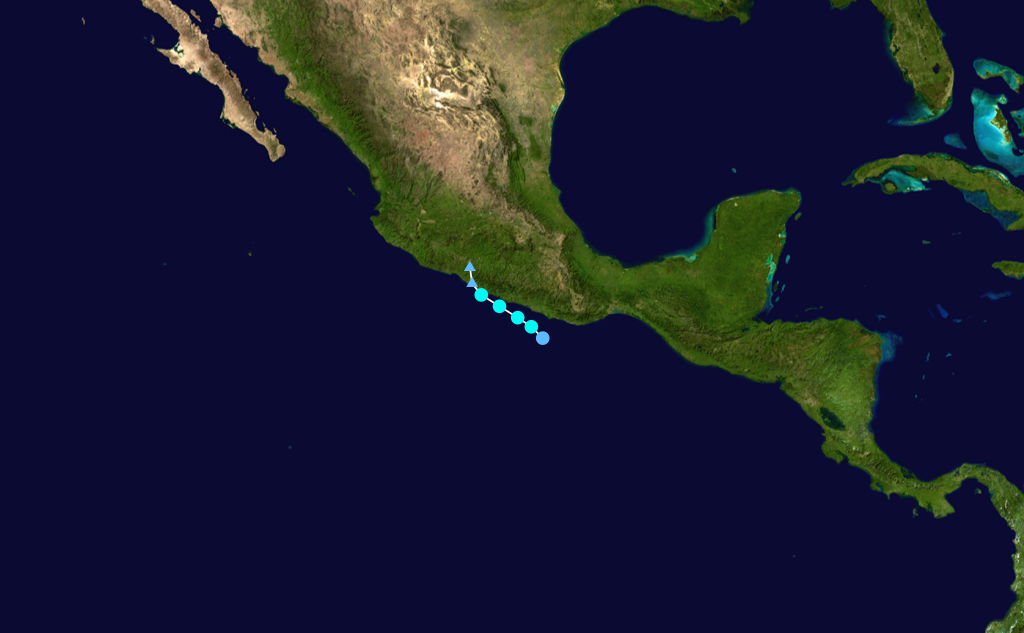
- Duration: June 17 – June 18
- Peak intensity: 85 km/h (50 mph) (1-min); 1000 hPa (mbar)

Early on the morning of June 17, a tropical depression formed 185 miles (298 km) west of Puerto Angel, Mexico. The depression strengthened into Tropical Storm Wallie. Meanwhile, Wallie was at its peak intensity of 50 mph (80 km/h). Wallie headed northwest and degenerated into an area of low pressure just off the Mexican coast early on June 18. The remnant low made landfall in the near Zihuatanejo, Mexico early on June 18. The low dissipated later that day.

Damage in Mexico from Wallie was described as the worst in eight years. Monetary damages were described was being in the "thousands", however an exact damage total is unknown. No deaths were reported due to the storm.

=== Tropical Storm Ava ===
- Tropical storm (SSHWS)
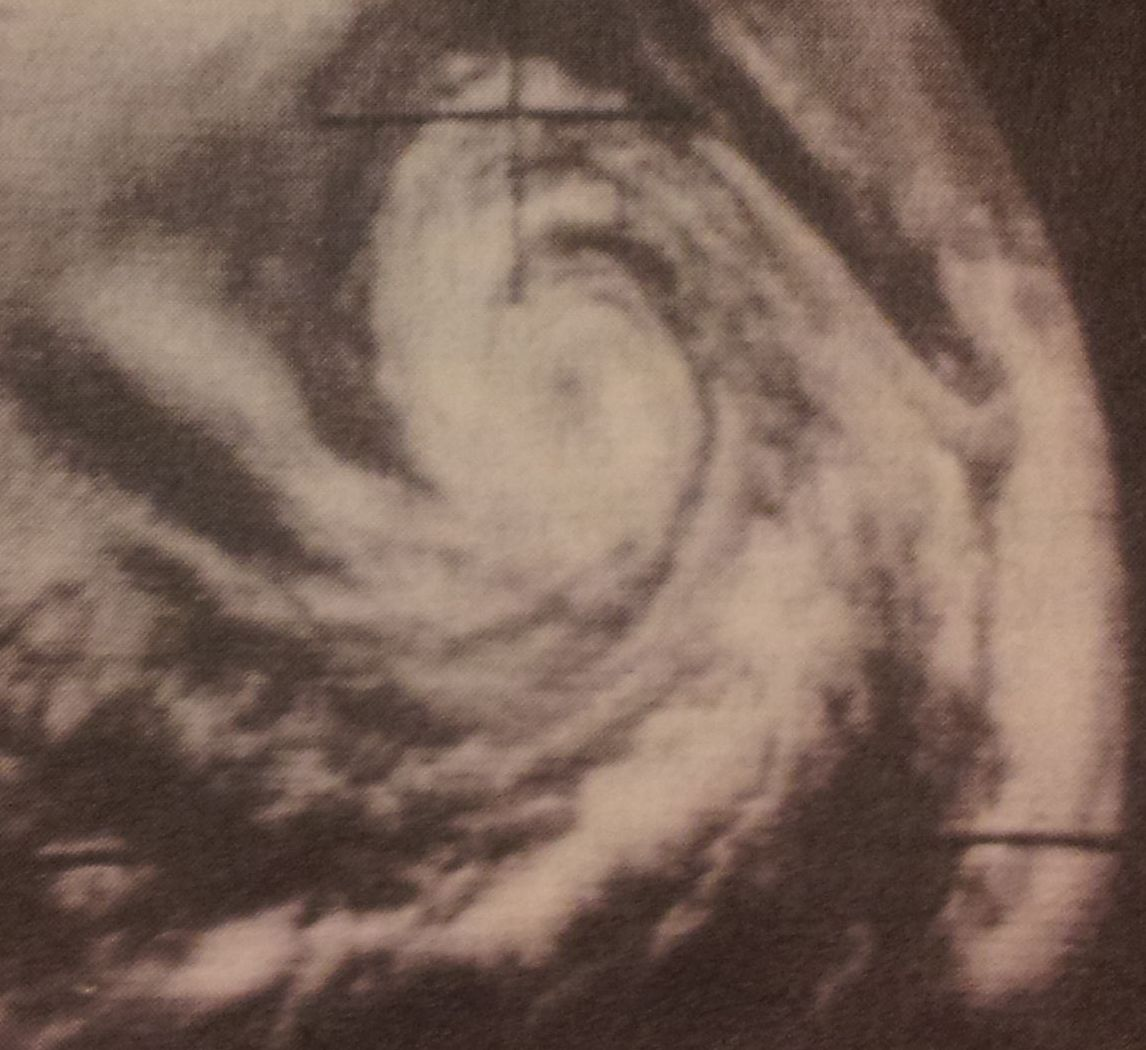
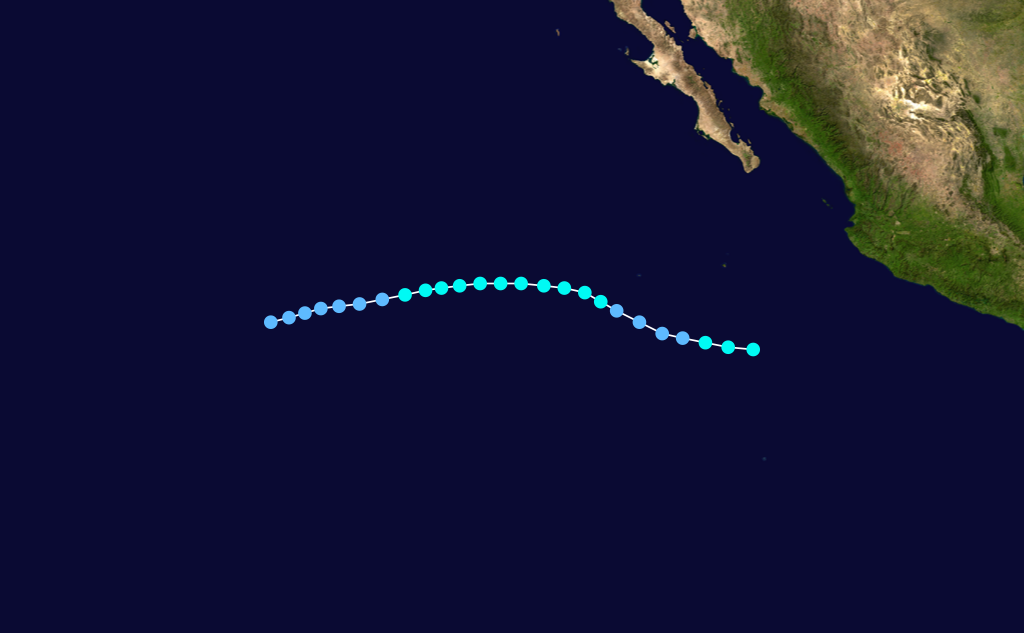
- Duration: June 29 – July 5
- Peak intensity: 85 km/h (50 mph) (1-min); 998 hPa (mbar)

Early on June 29, a tropical storm was identified 535 miles (861 km) south of Cabo San Lucas, Mexico and named Ava. At that time, the storm was at peak intensity of 50 mph (80 km/h). However, Tropical Storm Ava weakened into a tropical depression within 24 hours. Late on June 30, the depression re-strengthened into a tropical storm and regained peak intensity. At this time, the storm took a track that went north and back south gently. On July 3, Tropical Storm Ava weakened into a tropical depression. Ava dissipated early on July 5. The tropical storm stayed at sea, and no damage was reported.

=== Tropical Storm Bernice ===
- Tropical storm (SSHWS)
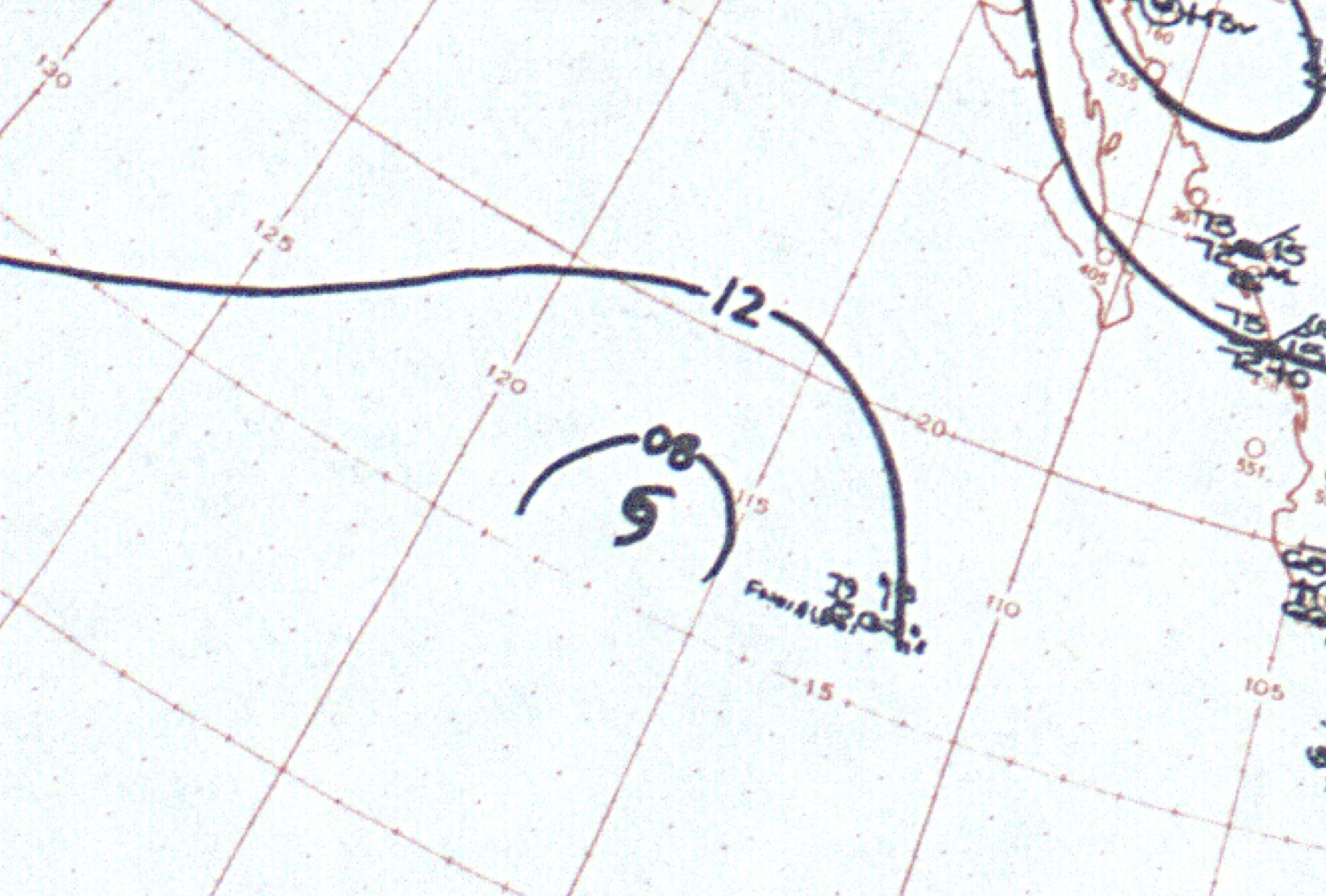
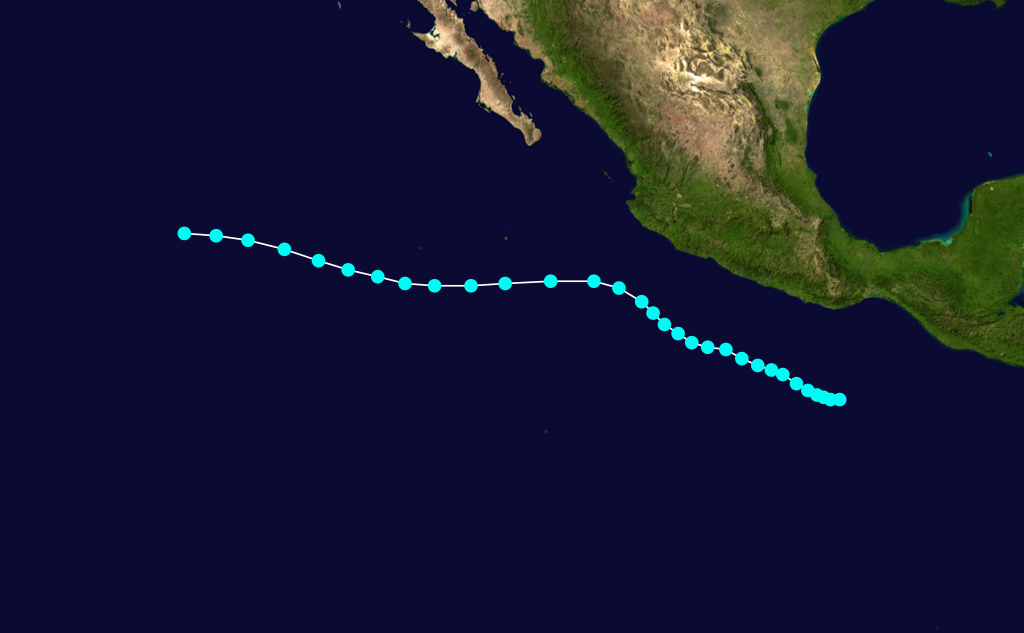
- Duration: June 30 – July 8
- Peak intensity: 85 km/h (50 mph) (1-min); 983 hPa (mbar)

On June 30, Tropical Storm Bernice formed. At this time, the system was located 275 miles (443 km) south of Puerto Angel, Mexico. For the next few days, the storm moved northeastward, while maintaining peak intensity of 50 mph (80 km/h). On July 5, Bernice stopped its northeastward motion and began to turn east, Berice dissipating on July 8, without ever impacting any land masses.

=== Tropical Storm Claudia ===
- Tropical storm (SSHWS)
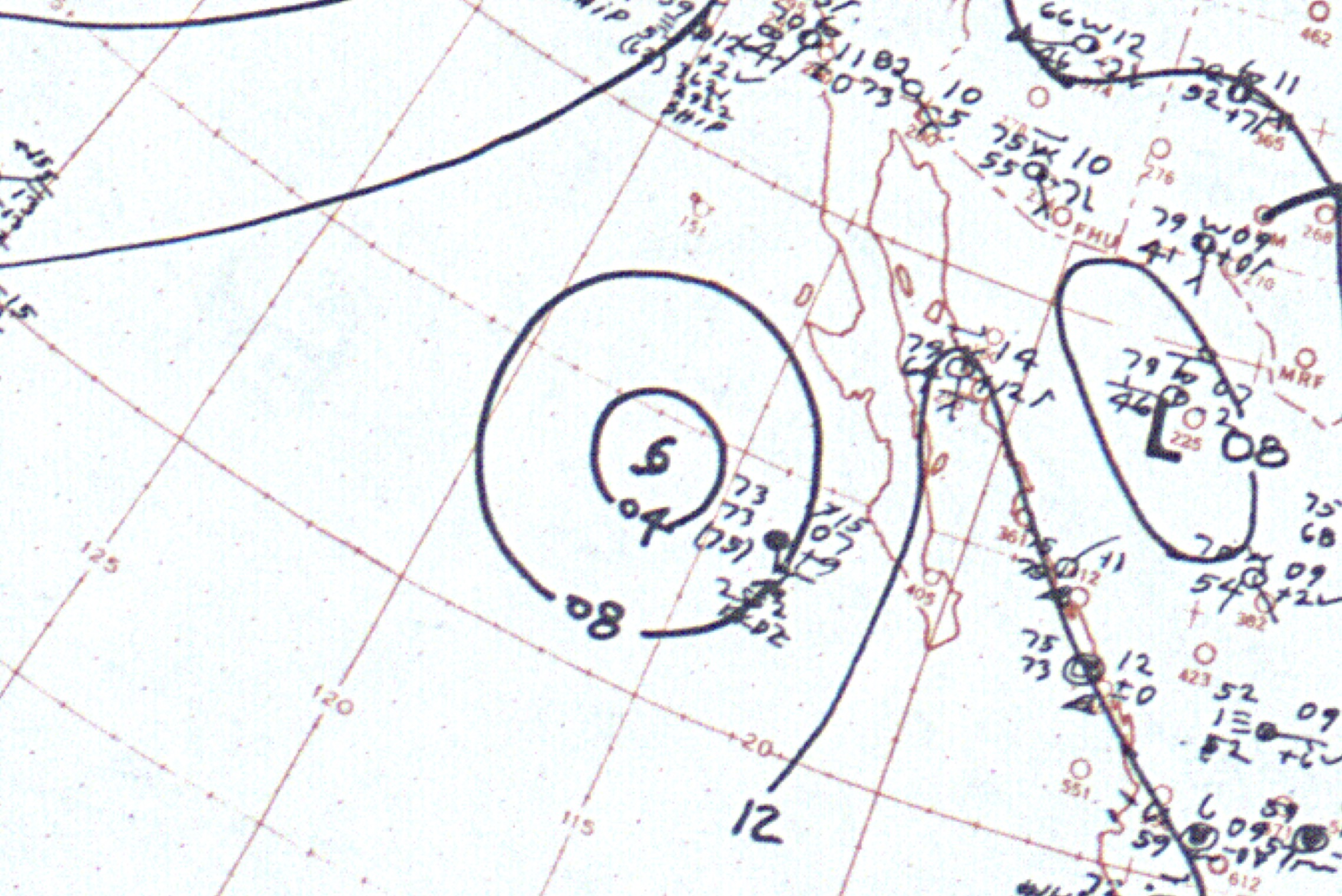
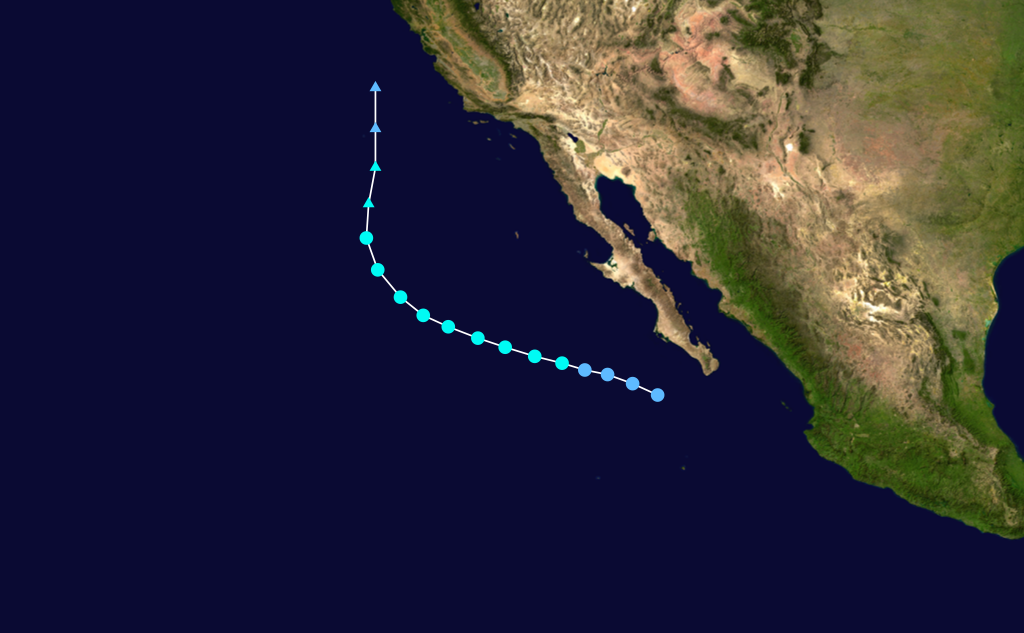
- Duration: August 7 – August 10
- Peak intensity: 85 km/h (50 mph) (1-min); 1004 hPa (mbar)

During the afternoon of August 7, a tropical depression formed 150 miles southwest of Cabo San Lucas, Mexico. On August 8, the cyclone strengthened into Tropical Storm Claudia. At that time, Claudia was reaching its peak intensity of 50 mph (80 km/h), while also beginning to recurve to the north. The storm remained at peak intensity while re-curving until August 10 when the wind speeds decreased slightly and advisories were discontinued. The storm never affected land.

=== Tropical Storm Doreen ===
- Tropical storm (SSHWS)
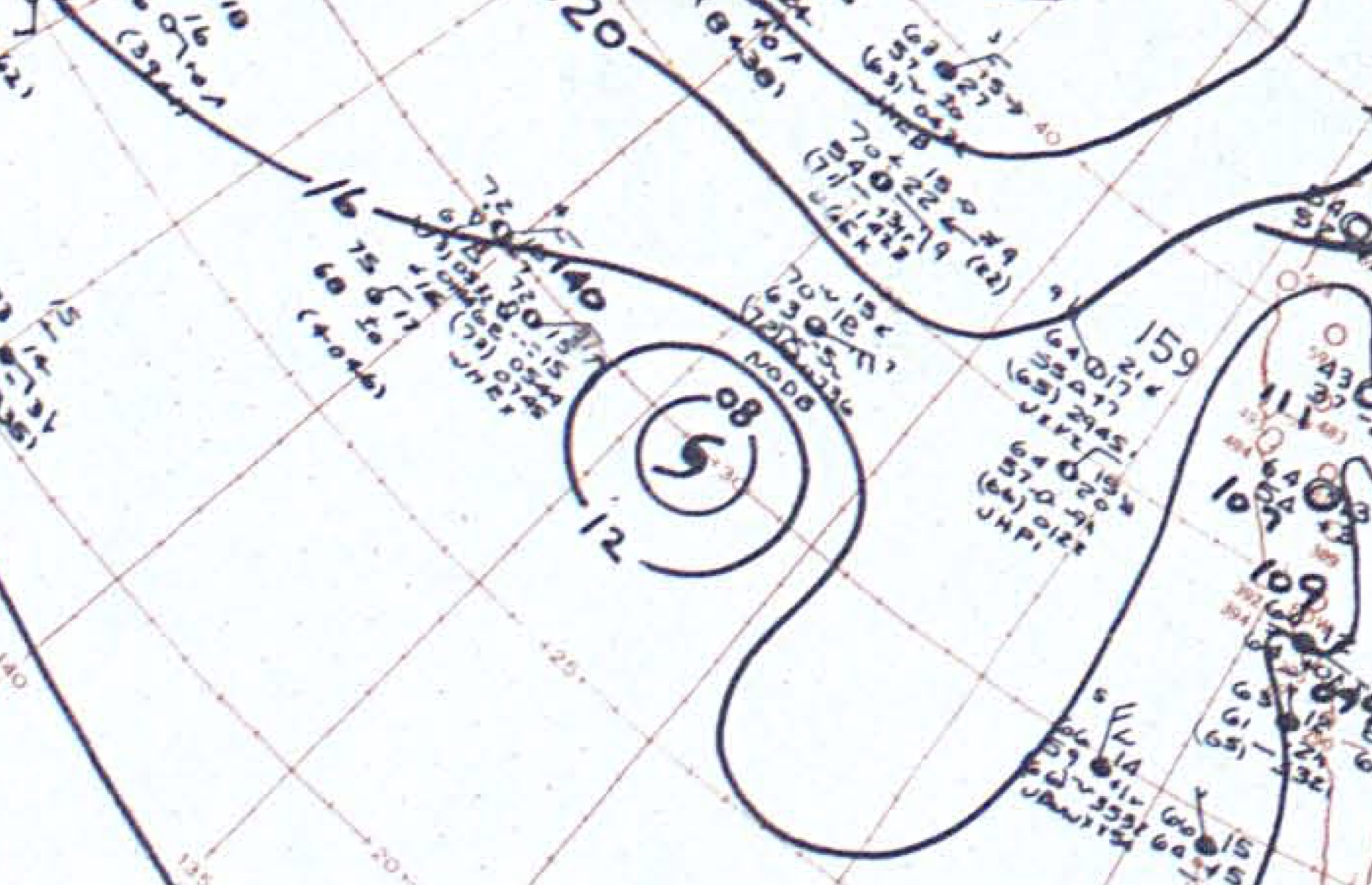
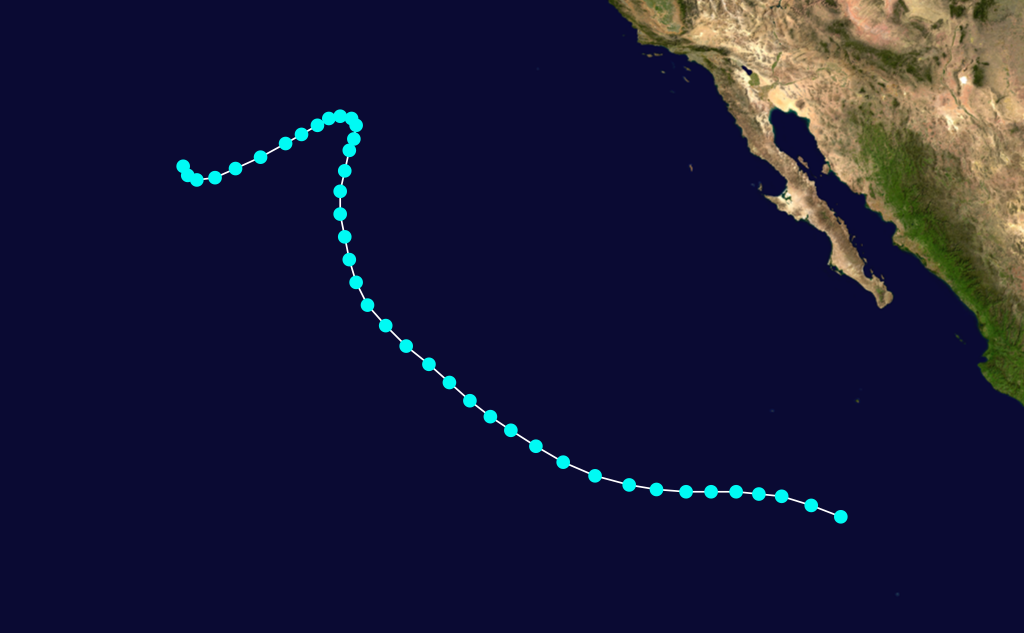
- Duration: August 21 – August 31
- Peak intensity: 85 km/h (50 mph) (1-min); ≥975 hPa (mbar)

Late on August 19, Tropical Storm Doreen was first located with a TIROS satellite image. The next day, a ship, the San Juan Prospector reported winds of 40 knots (46 mph; 74 km/h) and a pressure of 975 mbar (hPa). At this time, Doreen was moving to the northwest as 10 knots. On August 21, Doreen altered its course to the west, but reversed back to its original heading the next day. On August 22, the ship Kyoyu Maru, which was just north of the storm's center reported winds of 60 knots (69 mph; 110 km/h). Over the next few days, the storm gently recurved northward but then slowed down and headed to the southwest. On August 30, Tropical Storm Doreen crossed the Central Pacific where it dissipated the next morning. During the course of the system, 13 ships reported winds related to Doreen, but no damage was reported.

=== Hurricane Emily ===
- Category 1 hurricane (SSHWS)
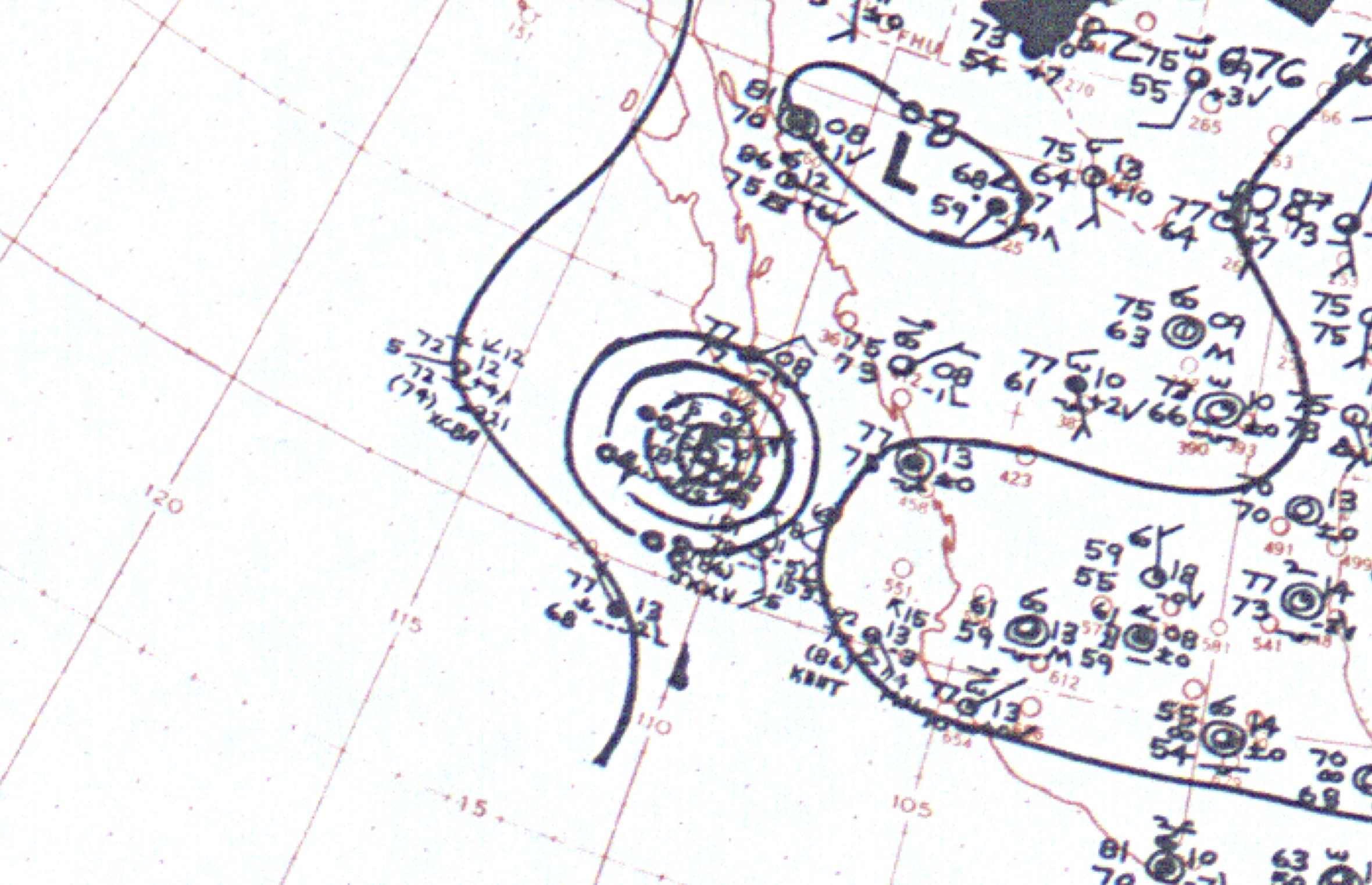
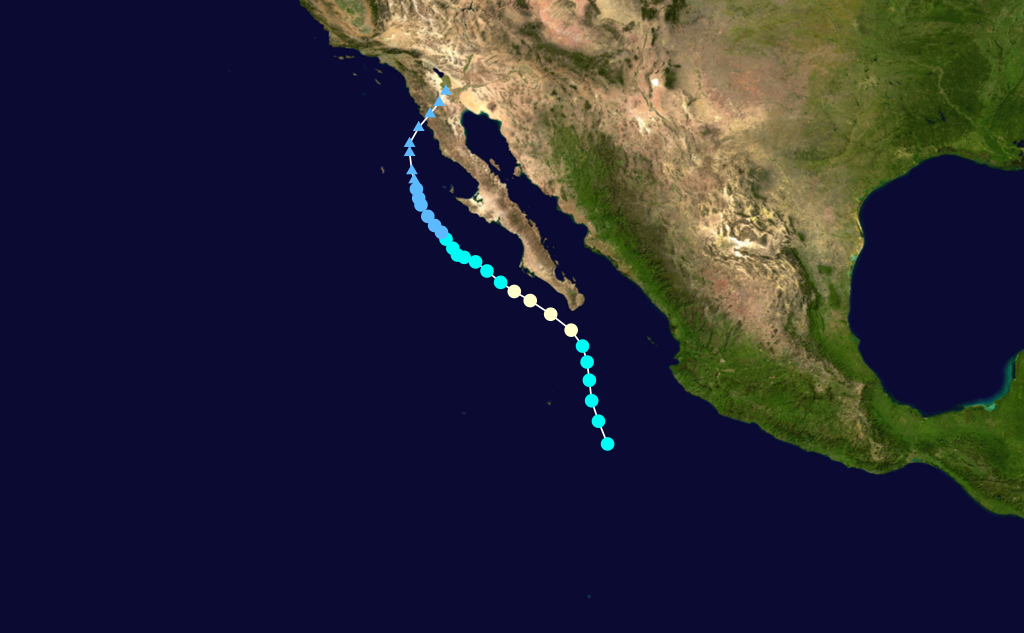
- Duration: August 30 – September 6
- Peak intensity: 90 mph (150 km/h) (1-min); 983 mbar (hPa)

On August 30, a moderate tropical storm developed. It slowing intensified, becoming the first hurricane of this season at 1200 UTC August 31. Emily began to weaken while moving northward in the Eastern Pacific. On 0000 UTC time September 3, Emily weakened into a tropical depression. It hit Baja California at the same intensity on September 6. According to one source, Emily was the first potentially hazardous storm in many years to approach Southern California. It approached Southern California while the SEALAB II Project was underway at La Jolla, California. There was concern that waves from Emily would move the Berkone, a support ship for SEALAB, away from the SEALAB site as the project would have to be halted. Rainfall totals reach 1 in (25 mm) in isolated areas.

=== Tropical Storm Florence ===
- Tropical storm (SSHWS)
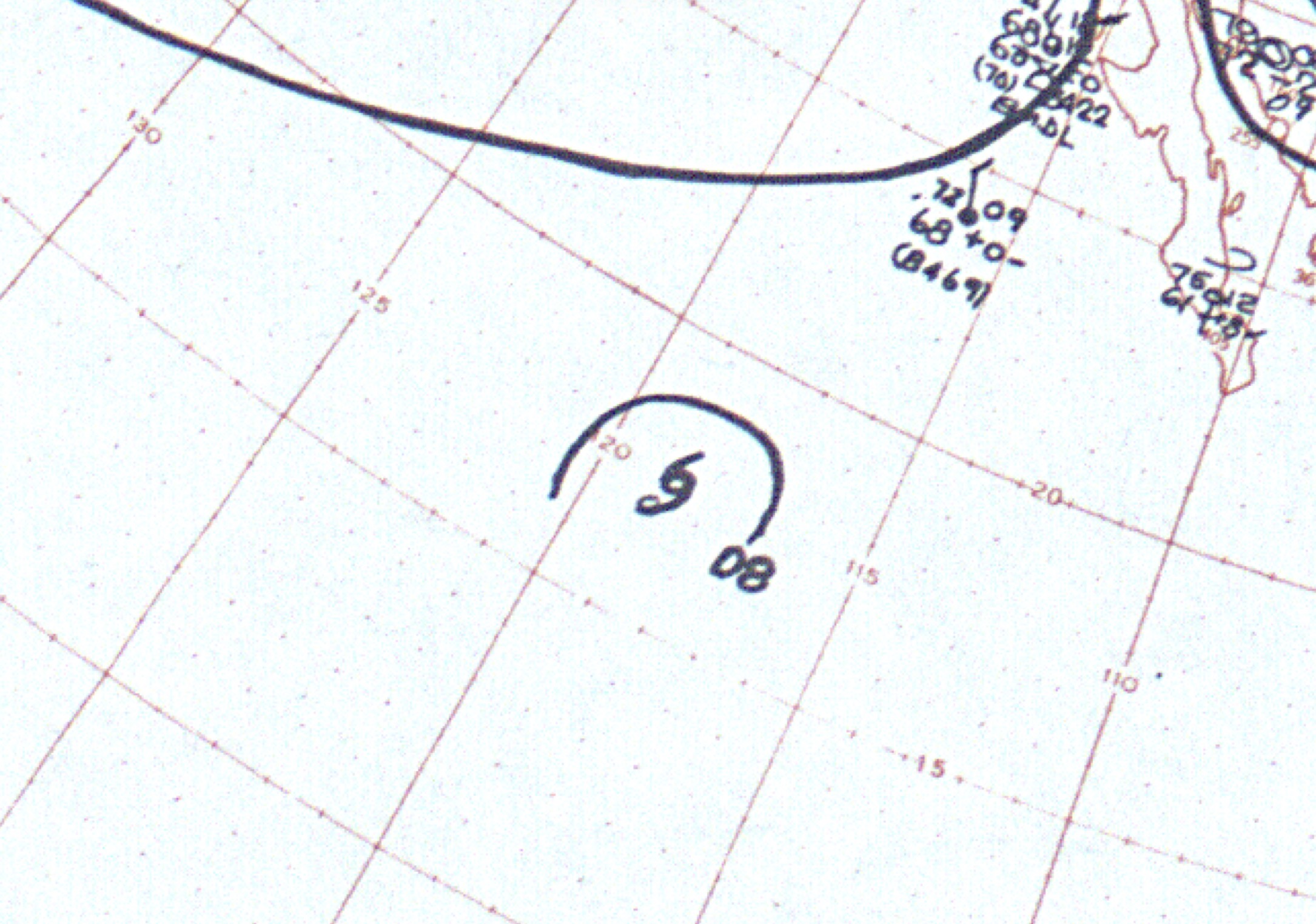
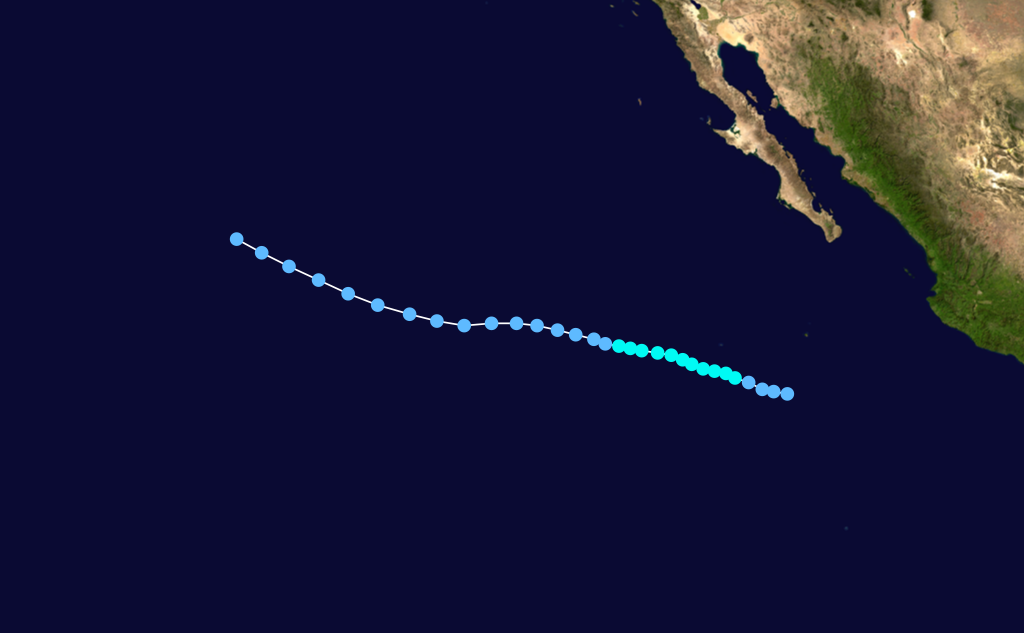
- Duration: September 8 – September 15
- Peak intensity: 85 km/h (50 mph) (1-min); 1006 hPa (mbar)

Tropical Storm Florence first formed on September 8 as a tropical depression. After 24 hours, Florence intensified into a tropical storm. At that time, the cyclone peaked with 50 mph (80 km/h) winds. However, on September 11, Florence suddenly weakened. After maintaining its intensity for a while, the depression was declared dissipated. Florence stayed at sea and no deaths or damage were reported.

=== Tropical Storm Glenda ===
- Tropical storm (SSHWS)
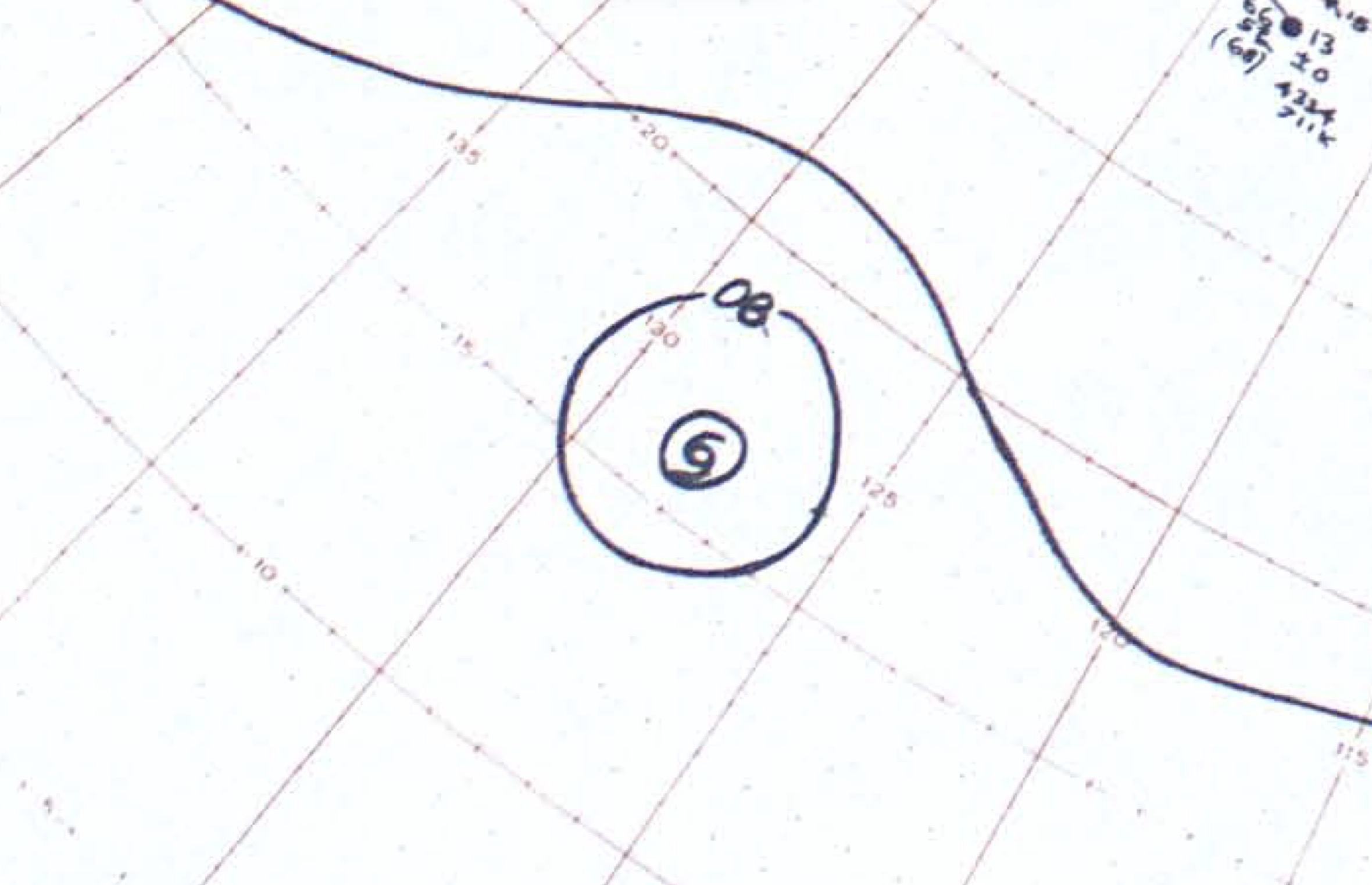
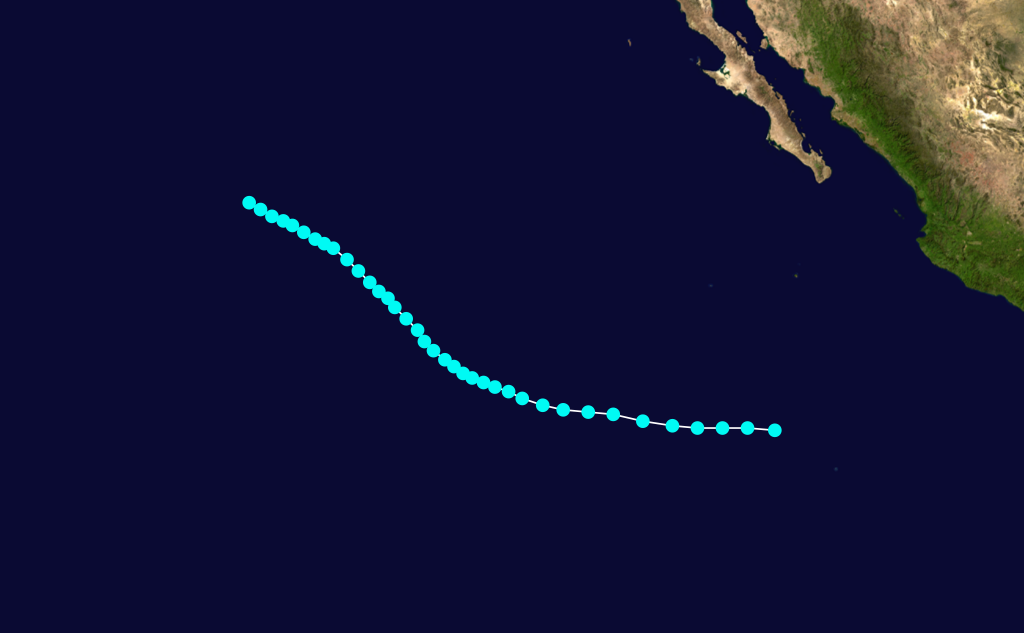
- Duration: September 13 – September 22
- Peak intensity: 85 km/h (50 mph) (1-min); 1005 hPa (mbar)

Tropical Storm Glenda formed on September 13 and maintained the same intensity of 50 mph (80 km/h) for nine days before advisories were dropped.

=== Tropical Storm Hazel ===
- Tropical storm (SSHWS)
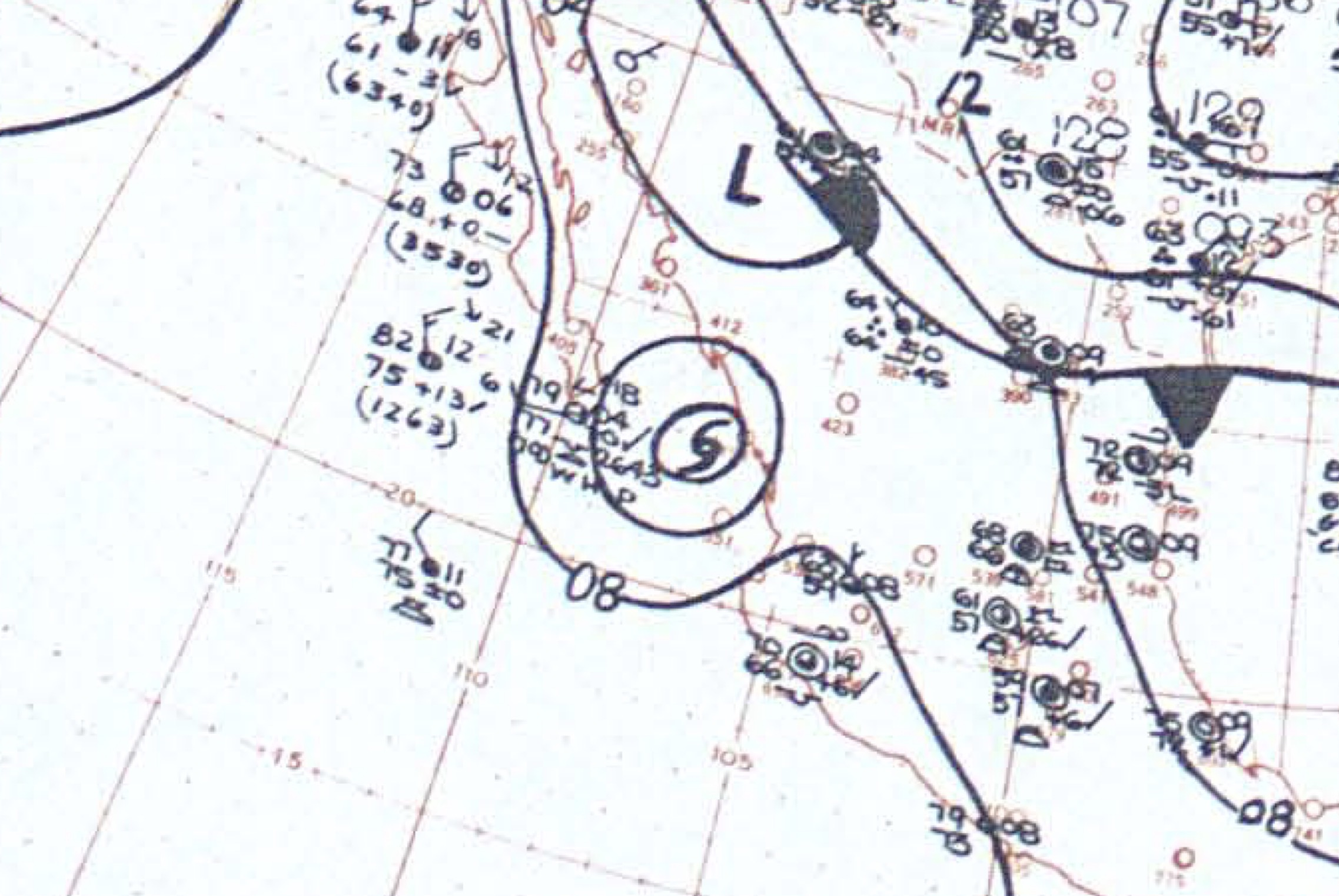
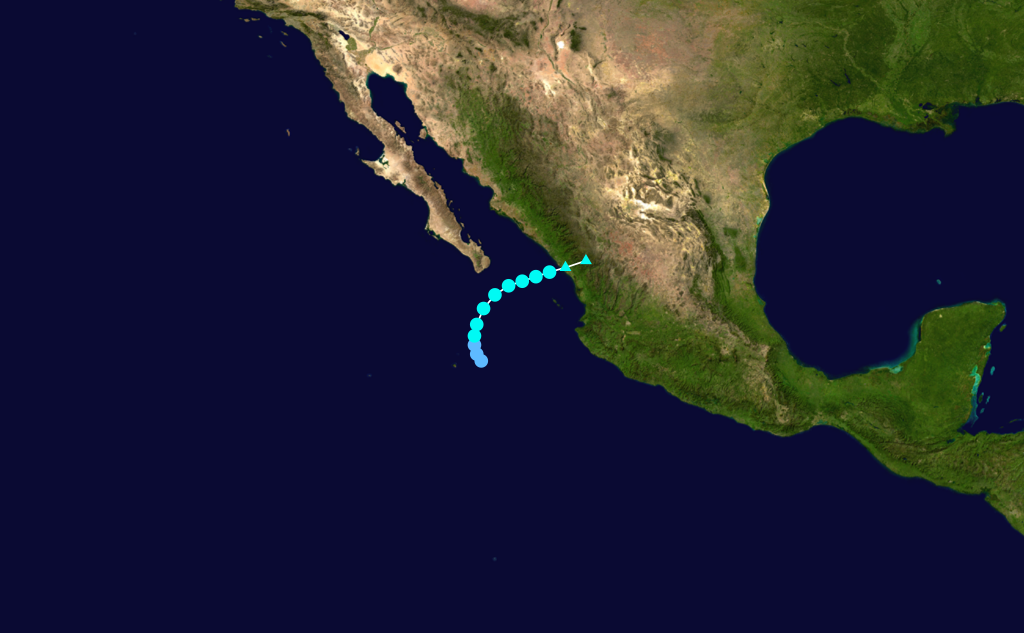
- Duration: September 24 – September 27
- Peak intensity: 85 km/h (50 mph) (1-min); 986 hPa (mbar)

Hazel developed from a northward-moving disturbance that originated southeast of Socorro Island. After reaching tropical storm strength on the Saffir–Simpson hurricane scale, the cyclone turned to the east-northeast – a motion confirmed by a ship report. The storm made landfall near Mazatlán on September 26 and quickly became extratropical. Thousands more were left homeless. Mazatlán's shrimp fleet, which makes up the base of the city's economy, suffered major damage, while in southern Sinaloa, 55,000 acres of cotton, corn, and sorghum were lost. At least 50 boats were damaged or sunk by the storm. The damage from the storm was estimated at $10 million (1965 USD) and possibly more, making Hazel the costliest tropical cyclone of the season.

== Storm names ==
The following names were used for tropical storms that formed in the North Pacific Ocean east of 140°W during 1965. The names came from a series of four rotating lists. Names were used one after the other without regard to year, and when the bottom of one list was reached, the next named storm received the name at the top of the next list. As the final tropical storm of the 1964 season was given the "T" name from list 2, the first two storms of the 1965 season were given the "V" and "W" names from that list ("U" being excluded). However, when it came time to assign a name to the season's third storm, instead of moving to the "A" name on list 3 ("X", "Y", and "Z" being excluded), forecasters returned the list 2 "A" name and proceeded from there.

- Victoria
- Wallie
- Ava
- Bernice
- Claudia
- Doreen
- Emily
- Florence
- Glenda
- Hazel

Had any tropical storms formed in the North Pacific between 140°W and the International Date Line in 1965, their names would have been drawn from the Western Pacific typhoon naming list.

=== Retirement ===
The name Hazel was retired following the 1965 season from further use in the Eastern Pacific basin, and replaced with Heather.

== See also ==
- Pacific hurricane season
- 1965 Atlantic hurricane season
- 1965 Pacific typhoon season
- Australian region cyclone seasons: 1964–65 1965–66
- South Pacific cyclone seasons: 1964–65 1965–66
- South-West Indian Ocean cyclone seasons: 1964–65 1965–66
