= Claudia (1959 film) =

1959 film

- Directed by: Walter Beck
- Release date: 1959
- Country: East Germany
- Language: German

Claudia is an East German film. It was released in 1959.
