= Claudia Marcella =

Several women of ancient Rome

Claudia Marcella was the name of several women of ancient Rome of the Marcelli branch of the Claudia gens. By the late Republican period girls from this branch were often called "Clodia".

A number of Marcellae are believed to have been the daughters of the consul Gaius Claudius Marcellus

- Claudia Marcella, a proposed daughter by an unknown woman, this Marcella might have been the mother of Publius Quinctilius Varus
- Claudia Marcella Major, (? - ?) oldest surviving daughter by Octavia Minor, married Marcus Vipsanius Agrippa
- Claudia Marcella Minor, (? - ?) youngest surviving daughter by Octavia Minor, grandmother of empress Messalina
- Claudia Marcella Ignota Prima, (? - ?) a daughter by Octavia Minor who died in childhood
- Claudia Marcella Ignota Secunda, (? - ?) a daughter by Octavia Minor who died in childhood

The two surviving daughters of Octavia (the sister of Roman emperor Augustus) by Marcellus became important in Augustus imperial plans. According to the Roman historian Suetonius, they were known as "the Marcellae sisters" or "the two Marcellae". The sisters were born in Rome and lived with their mother and their stepfather Triumvir Mark Antony in Athens, Greece. After 36 BC they accompanied their mother when she returned to Rome with their brother and half-sisters. They were raised and educated by their mother, their maternal uncle and their maternal aunt-by-marriage Roman Empress Livia Drusilla. They and their siblings provided a critical link between the past of the Roman Republic and the new Roman Empire. The marriages of the sisters and the children born to their unions assured republican family lines into the next generation.

A number of other women could have been Marcellae:

- Claudia, last wife of Quintus Lutatius Catulus may have been a Marcella. If so, she was likely a daughter of Gaius Marius' friend and legate Marcus Claudius Marcellus.
- Clodia, wife of Decimus Junius Brutus Callaicus and mother of Decimus Junius Brutus may have been a Marcella.
- The wife of Publius Autronius Paetus may have been a Marcella.

== Sources ==
Ancient

- Plutarch, Life of Mark Antony
- Suetonius, "Augustus", The Twelve Caesars
- Tacitus, Annales

Modern

- Annelise Freisenbruch, Caesars' Wives: Sex, Power, and Politics in the Roman Empire, Simon and Schuster, 2011
- Diana E. E. Kleiner, Cleopatra and Rome, Harvard University Press, 2009
- N. Kokkinos, Antonia Augusta: Portrait of a Great Roman Lady, Psychology Press, 1992
- M. Lightman & B. Lightman, A to Z of Ancient Greek and Roman Women, Infobase Publishing, 2008
- G. Stern, Women, Children, and Senators on the Ara Pacis Augustae: A Study of Augustus' Vision of a New World Order in 13 BC, ProQuest, 2006
- Ronald Syme, The Augustan Aristocracy, Oxford University Press, 1989
