= Claudia (vestal) =

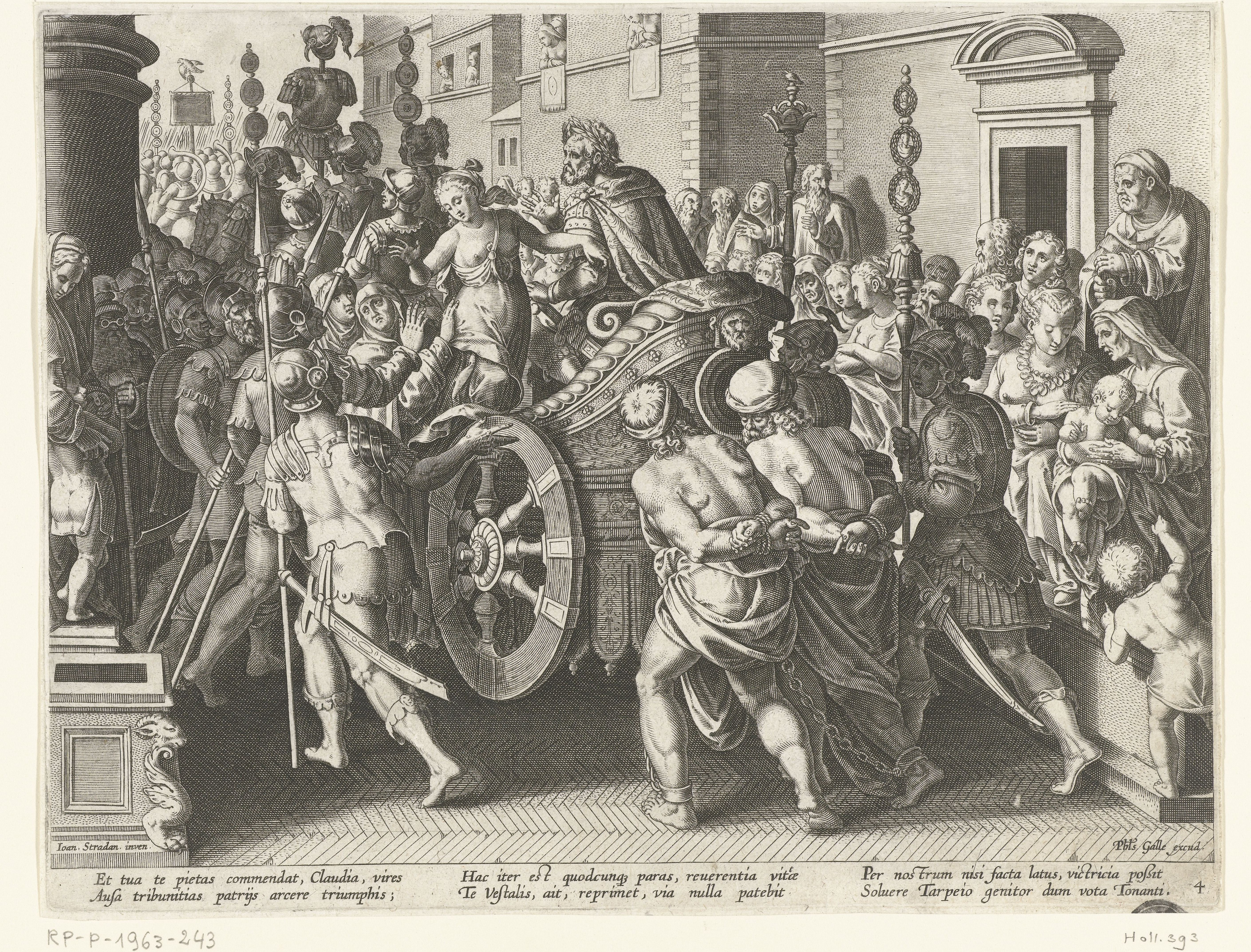
“Triumphal Procession of Claudia and her Father” engraved c. 1590 by Theodoor Galle

Claudia was an ancient Roman Vestal Virgin and the daughter of Appius Claudius Pulcher, consul in 143 BC. As recounted by historians such as Valerius Maximus, she intervened to prevent her father from being attacked by a tribune of the plebs, who attempted to drag him from his chariot during the celebration of his triumph.

The tribune may have intended to prevent Appius Claudius Pulcher from celebrating the triumph, as the triumph had been awarded in a politically unusual way, partly through her influence as Vestal, which had evaded the Tribune's ability to veto. Claudia interposed herself between her father and the attacking Tribune, forcing the attack to cease, then accompanied her father up to the capital.

As a Vestal Virgin, she was sacrosanct, and it would have been unthinkable for someone to attack her; thus, she was using her own body to protect her father. Her actions were highly admired, and orators - including Cicero - referred to her as an example of outstanding character.
