= 1936 North Indian Ocean cyclone season =

Seasonal boundaries
- First system formed: April 22, 1936
- Last system dissipated: December 31, 1936

Strongest storm
- Name: Two
  - Maximum winds: 120 km/h (75 mph) (3-minute sustained)
  - Lowest pressure: 979 hPa (mbar)

Seasonal statistics
- Depressions: 20 (18 official, 2 unofficial)
- Deep depressions: 8
- Cyclonic storms: 6
- Severe cyclonic storms: 3
- Very severe cyclonic storms: 3
- Total fatalities: 293 total
- Total damage: > $75,000 (1960 USD)

Related articles
- 1936 Atlantic hurricane season; 1936 Pacific hurricane season; 1936 Pacific typhoon season

The 1936 North Indian Ocean cyclone season was an above-average cyclone season, featuring eighteen depressions, eight of which intensified into deep depressions. Of those eight systems, six intensified into cyclonic storms. Of these six, three intensified further, becoming severe cyclonic storms and very severe cyclonic storms. The North Indian Ocean cyclone season has no official bounds, but cyclones tend to form between April and November, with peaks in late April to May and October to November. These dates conventionally delimit the period of each year when most tropical cyclones form in the northern Indian Ocean. The official Regional Specialized Meteorological Centre in the basin is the India Meteorological Department (IMD), which at the time, was the sole agency issuing warnings on tropical cyclones in the basin.

== Season summary ==
The 1936 North Indian Ocean cyclone season took place during the neutral phase of the El Niño–Southern Oscillation, which is correlated with less activity in the basin. Additionally, ENSO-neutral conditions are also correlated to a higher chance of landfall in the eastern coast of India, hence the fact that a majority of the systems impacted land. In total, the season had eighteen depressions, eight of which intensified into deep depressions, with six intensifying further into cyclonic storms, and three further developing into severe cyclonic storms and very severe cyclonic storms.

The season began on April 21, when a cyclone developed in the Bay of Bengal. Peaking as an very severe cyclonic storm, it would make landfall in modern-day Myanmar prior to dissipating. A month after that system dissipated, another very severe cyclonic storm formed in late May, making landfall in East India prior to dissipating. Three depressions would form in June, with two developing into cyclonic storms. In July, three depressions would form, with one of them developing into a deep depression prior to dissipating. In August, two systems would form, with one of them becoming a deep depression prior to making landfall in Andhra Pradesh. September would feature three systems. The first and second systems, weak depression, would not be of much importance. However, the third system would peak as a very severe cyclonic storm prior to striking Odisha in early October. In October, only one system, a deadly cyclonic storm would form. However, November and December would be more active, featuring two depressions each. The last system, a weak depression offshore Sri Lanka, would form on December 30 and dissipate early the next day.

== Systems ==
=== Very Severe Cyclonic Storm One ===
1936 Burma cyclone

- Very severe cyclonic storm (IMD)
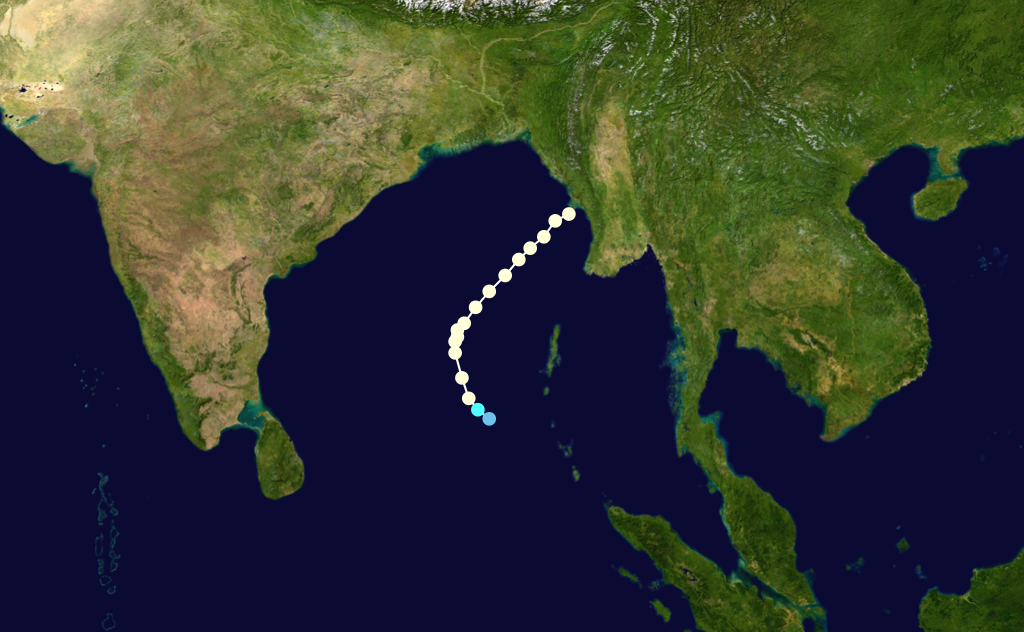
- Duration: 22 April – 26 April
- Peak intensity: 120 km/h (75 mph) (3-min); 993 hPa (mbar)

On April 21, due to a temporary advancement of the southwest monsoon, a low-pressure area was first identified near the Nicobar Islands. Developing over the southeastern Bay of Bengal, later that day, it coalesced into an area of unsettled weather. Further development occurred, and on 00:00 UTC the next day, the disturbance developed into a depression west of the Nicobar Islands. Undergoing rapid intensification, by 12:00 UTC that same day, the cyclone had peaked as a very severe cyclonic storm with sustained winds of 65 kn (75 mph; 120 km/h). It later attained a minimum pressure of 993 hPa (29.3 inHg) at 21:00 UTC that day. Soon after, the cyclone recurved, with its intensity remaining the same as it tracked northeastward the next few days. At 03:00 UTC on April 26, the cyclone made its first landfall over Cheduba Island near peak intensity, producing intense winds there. Soon after, it made its second landfall along the coast of Myanmar, somewhere between Thandwe and Kyaukphyu. Rapidly weakening, it dissipated later that day.

The most intense storm to strike Myanmar prior to 1970, immense property damage occurred in Thandwe and Kyaukphyu. Many villages along the coast were destroyed either due to the cyclone's winds or storm surge. Over 150,000 were affected by the resulting flooding that came from it. In some villages, torrential rainfall destroyed all of the grain that was stored while thousands of cattle were lost. Initial reports also stated that more than due to the cyclone, over 1000 people had died or drowned, however, a 2006 report by Jeff Masters of Wunderground stated that only 36 people were killed.

=== Very Severe Cyclonic Storm Two ===
- Very severe cyclonic storm (IMD)
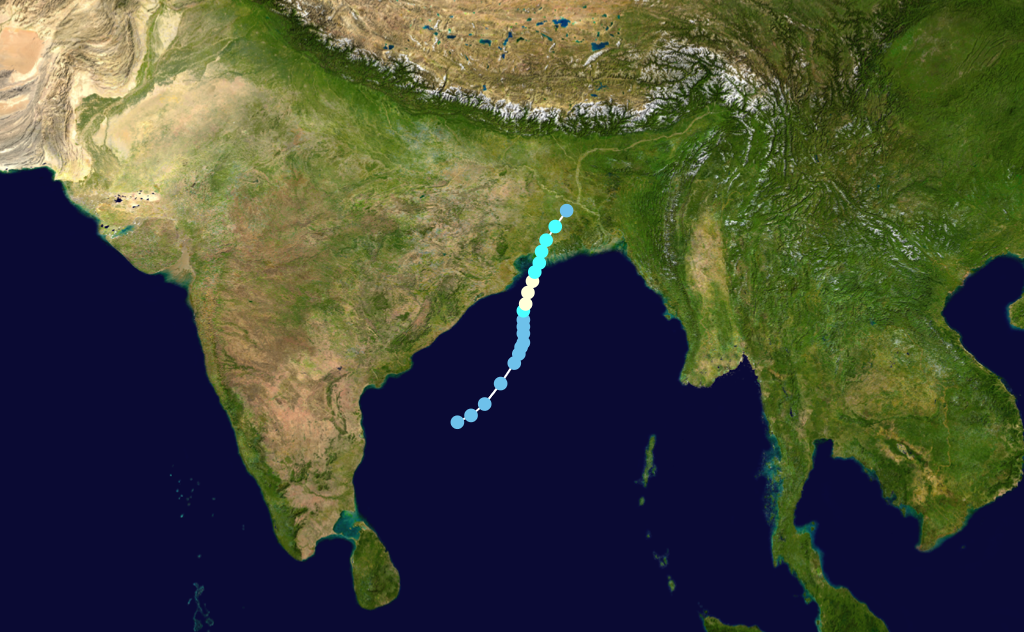
- Duration: 22 May – 29 May
- Peak intensity: 120 km/h (75 mph) (3-min); 979 hPa (mbar)

On May 22, due to the southwest monsoon strengthening, an area of unsettled weather formed over the Bay of Bengal. Just a few hours later, this disturbance developed into a depression. However, further intensification was slow to occur, as it would not become a cyclonic storm until May 25. Paralleling the eastern coast of India as it recurved northwards prior to resuming its northeastward track a few days later, the next day, the cyclone peaked as a very severe cyclonic storm with sustained winds of 75 mph (120 km/h). Despite weakening into a severe cyclonic storm as it made landfall along the coast of eastern India on May 27, it attained a minimum pressure of 979 hPa (28.9 inHg) at that time. Tracking northeastward after landfall, it weakened rapidly once inland, eventually dissipating over Mymensingh on May 29.

Due to the cyclone, the southwest monsoon was able to establish itself in Northern India and Myanmar. As a result, torrential rainfall occurred, peaking with 21 in (53 cm) in Cherrapunji and 15 in (38 cm) in Shillong on May 29. Many rivers flooded, carrying away cattle and making many families homeless. Nearly every single building in Tura was damaged due to flooding as overflowing rivers caused many boats to be lost.

=== Cyclonic Storm Three ===
- Cyclonic storm (IMD)
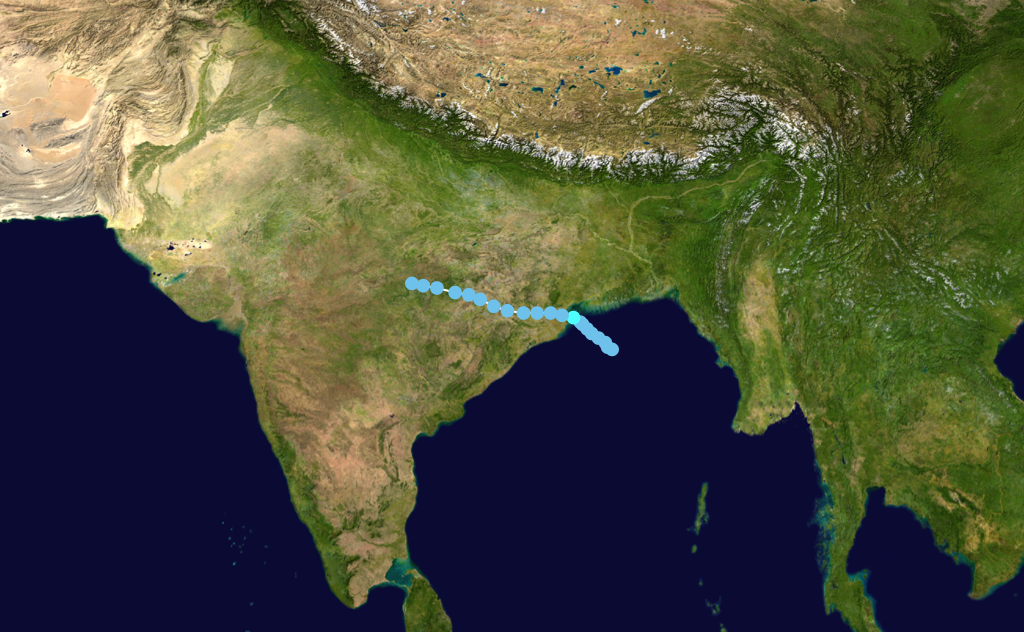
- Duration: 11 June – 17 June
- Peak intensity: 65 km/h (40 mph) (3-min);

On June 10, an area of unsettled weather was first over the northern Bay of Bengal. Developing into a cyclonic circulation a few hours later, on June 11, this disturbance developed into a depression. As it tracked northwest towards India, it intensified into a deep depression a few hours later. As a result, prior to making landfall southeast of Balasore, it peaked as a minimal cyclonic storm early on June 13 with peak winds of 40 mph (65 km/h). However, once inland, it rapidly weakened, becoming a depression by June 14. The weakening depression would persist northwestwards, dissipating over Westcentral India on June 17.

Due to the cyclone, the southwest monsoon was able to establish itself in North and Central India, causing torrential rainfall. As a result, a country boat travelling in the Gomal River capsized, causing 20 deaths. Locally heavy rain would also occur in the Central Provinces and Orissa, peaking in Kumhari, which received 11 in (28 cm) of rainfall. The cyclone, which at the time was expected to impact Mount Everest, prevented Hugh Ruttledge and his fellow climbers from successfully completing their expedition.

=== Depression Four ===
- Depression (IMD)
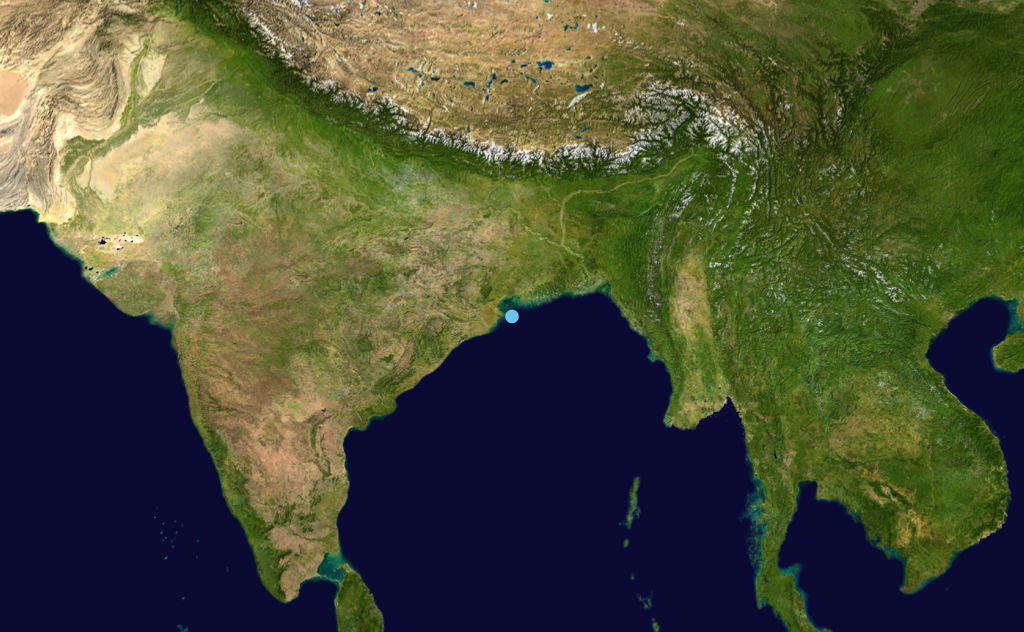
- Duration: 25 June – 28 June
- Peak intensity: ≤45 km/h (30 mph) (3-min);

On June 21, after temporarily weakening, the monsoon began strengthening over the Bay of Bengal. As a result, three days later, a trough of low pressure was first identified offshore Orissa and Ganjam. This trough would develop in favorable environmental conditions, becoming a depression on June 25. Deepening as it travelled near-stationary for the next few days, the depression finally made landfall near Balasore on June 28. Once inland, the depression rapidly weakened, dissipating just a few hours later.

=== Cyclonic Storm Five ===
- Cyclonic storm (IMD)
- Duration: 28 June – 4 July
- Peak intensity: 85 km/h (50 mph) (3-min);

On June 28, a land depression was first identified over the west Central Provinces. As it tracked northwestwards and then westwards, it began deepening over Deesa. As a result, early on July 1, it developed into a cyclonic storm over Badin, peaking with sustained winds of 50 mph (85 km/h) later that day. However, weakening soon commenced, and as it crossed into the Arabian Sea on July 2, it weakened into a deep depression. The weakening cyclone would traverse westwards prior to dissipating over Oman on July 4.

Heavy rainfall associated with the storm caused three deaths in Ernakulam and uprooted several trees. Additionally, three country boats carrying merchandise were capsized.

=== Depression Six ===
- Depression (IMD)
- Duration: 2 July – 5 July
- Peak intensity: ≤45 km/h (30 mph) (3-min);

On June 30, a low-pressure area was first identified over Myanmar. Travelling eastwards, this disturbance would spawn an area of unsettled weather over the north and central Bay of Bengal. As a result of this, on July 2, a depression formed over the bay. Initially tracking north, after it made landfall between Balasore and Sagar Island the next day, it would begin tracking northwestwards instead. As a result, the weakening depression would persist until finally dissipating on July 5.

=== Land Depression Seven ===
- Depression (IMD)
- Duration: 7 July – 11 July
- Peak intensity: ≤45 km/h (30 mph) (3-min);

On July 7, a land depression was first identified near Lucknow. This depression would slowly track southwestwards, deepening slightly due to the rains intensifying the monsoon over the United Provinces. However, two days later, it began tracking northwestwards, weakening steadily. As a result, it dissipated over Bareilly on July 11.

=== Deep Depression Eight ===
- Deep depression (IMD)
- Duration: 21 July – 29 July
- Peak intensity: 55 km/h (35 mph) (3-min);

On July 20, a cyclonic circulation was first identified offshore Orissa. Developing, it soon became a depression the next day. Developing as it initially moved near-stationary, on 03:00 UTC that same day, it became a deep depression. Soon after, it tracked northwestwards, making landfall along the coast of Puri and Gopalpur two days later. Once inland, the depression slowly weakened as it tracked northwestwards, slowly tracking northwards prior to dissipating on July 29.

=== Depression Nine ===
- Depression (IMD)
- Duration: 17 August – 18 August
- Peak intensity: ≤45 km/h (30 mph) (3-min);

On August 15, due to the strengthening monsoon, an area of unsettled weather formed in the northern Bay of Bengal. Developing offshore Odisha, two days later, the disturbance developed into a depression. Tracking northwards, after it made landfall near Chandabali on the evening of August 18, it rapidly weakened, dissipating soon after.

=== Deep Depression Ten ===
- Deep depression (IMD)
- Duration: 26 August – 1 September
- Peak intensity: 55 km/h (35 mph) (3-min);

On August 25, an area of unsettled weather with a weak low-level circulation formed over the northern Bay of Bengal. Developing into a shallow depression early the next day, it initially stalled prior to deepening. As a result, as it tracked southwestwards prior to recurving on August 28, it peaked as a deep depression. However, as it neared the coast, the system weakened into a depression, prior to making landfall near Kalingapatnam on 03:00 UTC on August 29. Tracking northwestwards soon after, it persisted inland prior to dissipating on September 1.

=== Depression Eleven ===
- Depression (IMD)
- Duration: 5 September – 9 September
- Peak intensity: ≤45 km/h (30 mph) (3-min);

On September 4, due to the strengthening monsoon, an area of unsettled weather formed in the northern Bay of Bengal. Developing into a depression a day later, it began tracking northwestwards. Never developing further, after it made landfall in Odisha on September 7, it kept moving northwestwards prior to being absorbed by a trough of low pressure over northern India.

=== Depression Twelve ===
- Depression (IMD)
- Duration: 29 September – 1 October
- Peak intensity: ≤45 km/h (30 mph) (3-min);

On September 27, an area of unsettled weather was first identified over the Bay of Bengal. The next day, ship reports revealed that two cyclonic circulations had formed from this disturbance. Both developing into depressions on September 29, the former one would intensify further prior to making landfall in Tharrawaddy. Tracking northwestwards soon after, it would degenerate into a weak low-pressure area. Despite that it was able to retain its upper-level circulation.

=== Very Severe Cyclonic Storm Thirteen ===
1936 Odisha cyclone

- Very severe cyclonic storm (IMD)
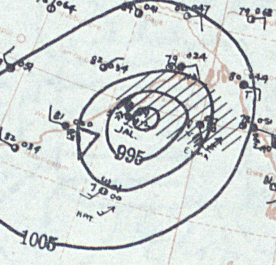
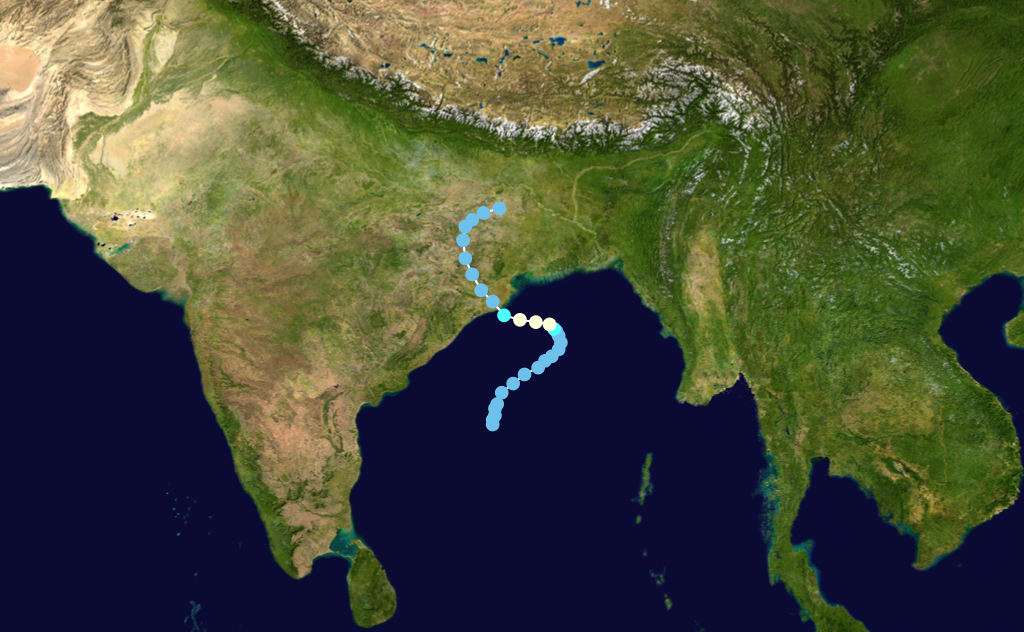
- Duration: 29 September – 7 October
- Peak intensity: 120 km/h (75 mph) (3-min); 986 hPa (mbar)

On September 29, two depressions would form from an area of unsettled weather over the Bay of Bengal. While the former one would make landfall in Tharrawaddy and dissipate, the latter one would track northeastwards due to favorable upper-level conditions. As a result, on October 2, it would deepen into a deep depression, developing into a cyclonic storm a few hours later. Further developing, the next day, the system intensified into a severe cyclonic storm, peaking with sustained winds of 75 mph (120 km/h). On 21:00 UTC that same day, the cyclone would make landfall alongside the coast of Odisha. Rapidly weakening once inland, by the next day, the cyclone had weakened into a deep depression, further weakening as it recurved northeastwards. It would finally dissipate over Bangladesh on October 7.

Widespread rainfall from the cyclone affected Myanmar, Bangladesh, and portions of India, with the most concentrated amounts seeing in Odisha. As a result, extensive damage occurred in the state, with Cuttack alone seeing 300 homes collapsing. In Bangladesh, many areas in Noakhali District were inundated due to the cyclone's storm surge. In West Bengal, the cyclone produced a tornado which capsized several country boats carrying jute. In total, the cyclone caused one death.

=== Cyclonic Storm Fourteen ===
1936 Andhra Pradesh cyclone

- Cyclonic storm (IMD)
- Duration: 25 October – 31 October
- Peak intensity: 85 km/h (50 mph) (3-min);

On October 25, due to the northeast monsoon establishing itself, a cyclonic circulation developed in the southern Bay of Bengal. Developing into a depression later that day, the cyclone would develop into a cyclonic storm as it tracked north-northwestwardly. Soon after, it peaked with sustained winds of 50 mph (85 km/h) on October 27. Tracking northwestwardly for a while, it later made landfall near Machilipatnam on 06:00 UTC the next day. Weakening soon after, it became a deep depression over Hyderabad, finally dissipating over the Central Provinces on October 31.

Severe rainfall from the cyclone caused immense damage in Andhra Pradesh. Many villages were either inundated or collapsed due to heavy rainfall, causing thousands to become homeless. In Chirala, the tobacco factory sustained 2 lakh rupees ($75,000) in damage. In total, the storm killed 233 people in India. In the storm's aftermath, Mahatma Gandhi visited flooded areas to bring help pay for flood relief.

=== Deep Depression Fifteen ===
- Deep depression (IMD)
- Duration: 3 November – 15 November
- Peak intensity: 55 km/h (35 mph) (3-min); 1005 hPa (mbar)

On November 1, a low-pressure area formed near the eastern coast of Sri Lanka. Developing further, as it tracked into the Arabian Sea two days later, it became a depression. Tracking westwards and then northwestwards, on November 6, the depression intensified further, becoming a deep depression. Further deepening as it tracked northwards towards the coast of Gujarat, it attained a minimum pressure of 1,005 hPa (29.7 inHg) on November 12. However, soon after, it rapidly weakened, dissipating on November 15 over Kutch.

=== Depression Sixteen ===
- Depression (IMD)
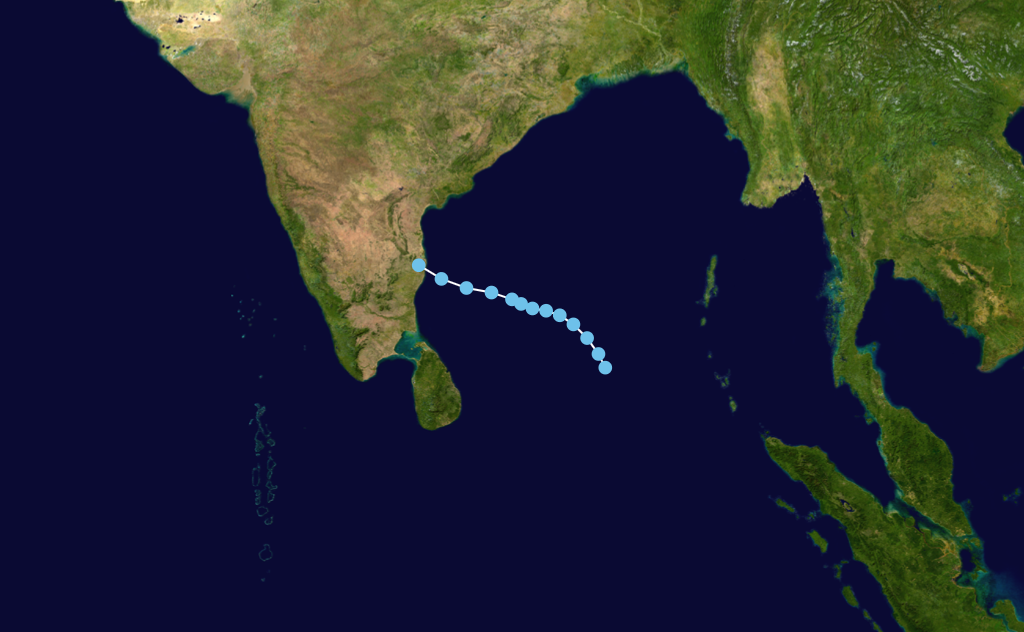
- Duration: 4 November – 7 November
- Peak intensity: ≤45 km/h (30 mph) (3-min);

On November 3, an area of unsettled weather formed in the southern Bay of Bengal, developing into a depression early the next day. Never intensifying further, the depression would track northwestwardly and then west-northwestwardly prior to weakening four days later. It soon made landfall along the coast of Chennai, dissipating a few hours later.

=== Depression Seventeen ===
- Depression (IMD)
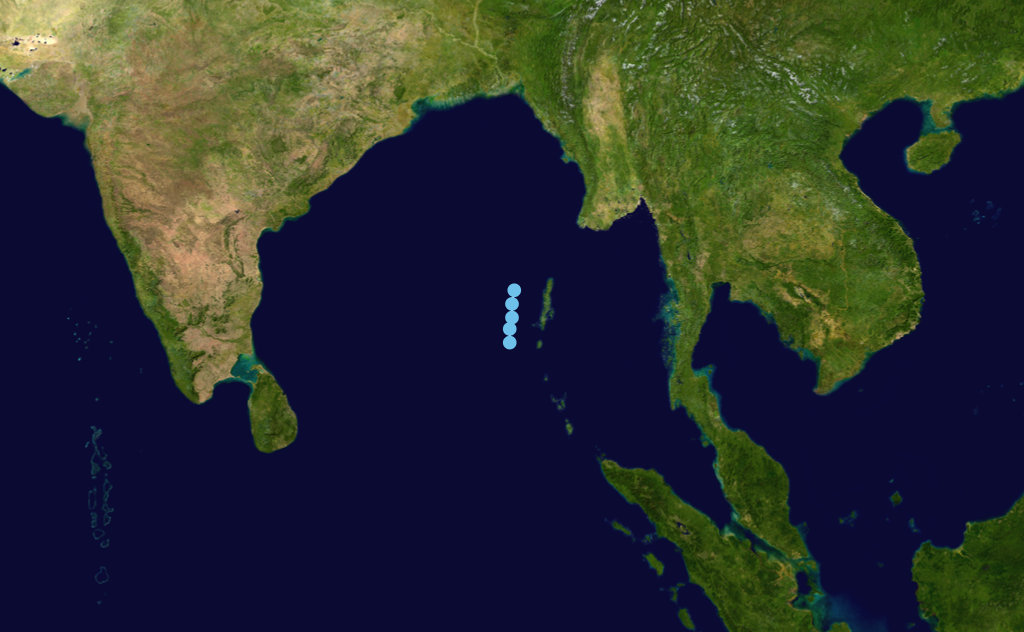
- Duration: 2 December – 4 December
- Peak intensity: ≤45 km/h (30 mph) (3-min);

From November 28–30, a low-pressure area in the Gulf of Thailand would produce convective activity in the Andaman Sea. As it passed through Thailand and entered the Andaman Sea on December 1, it would produce an area of unsettled weather which developed into a depression early the next day. Never intensifying further, the depression degenerated into a trough of low pressure on December 4. This remnant trough would persist prior to dissipating two days later.

=== Depression Eighteen ===
- Depression (IMD)
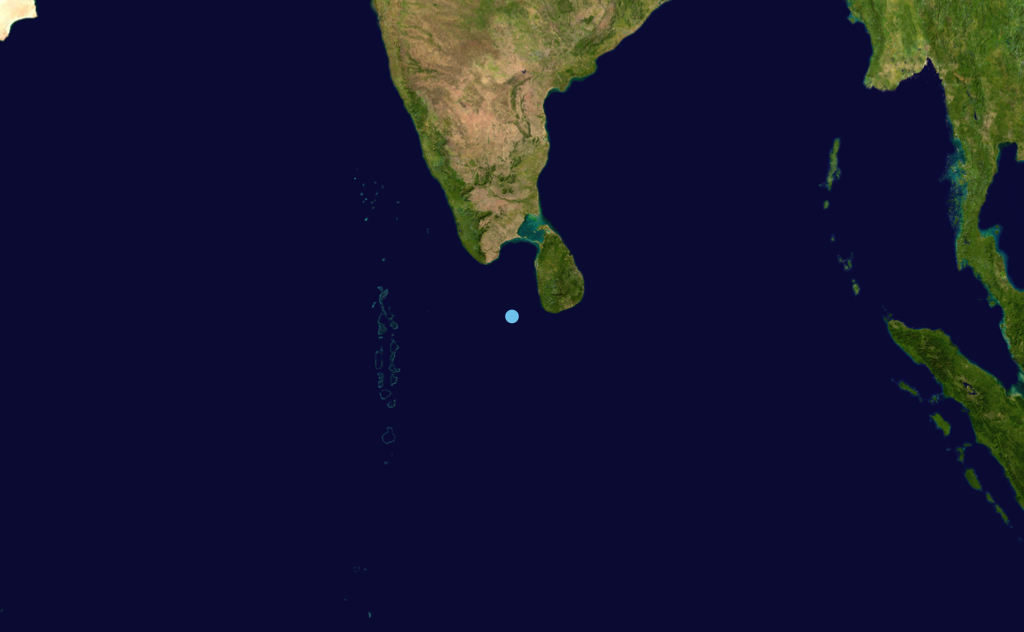
- Duration: 30 December – 31 December
- Peak intensity: ≤45 km/h (30 mph) (3-min);

On December 30, an area of unsettled weather formed offshore Sri Lanka over the southwest Bay of Bengal, developing into a depression a few hours later. Never intensifying further, the depression would track southwesterly into the Arabian Sea prior to degenerating into a low-pressure area early the next day.

=== Other systems ===
- According to IBTrACS, on July 2, a tropical cyclone formed in the border of India and Pakistan. Crossing into the Arabian Sea the next day, it dissipated.
- According to IBTrACS, on July 15, a depression with sustained winds of 30 mph (45 km/h) formed in modern-day Pakistan. Crossing into the Arabian Sea the next day, it dissipated.

== Bibliographies ==
- India Meteorological Department (1936). "Annual Summary — Storms & Depressions" (PDF). India Weather Review. National Oceanic and Atmospheric Administration. Archived from the original (PDF) on 2019-06-14.
- Wahiduzzaman, Md; Oliver, Eric C. J.; Wotherspoon, Simon J.; Luo, Jing-Jia (February 2020). "Seasonal forecasting of tropical cyclones in the North Indian Ocean region: the role of El Niño-Southern Oscillation". Climate Dynamics. 54 (3–4): 1571–1589. doi:10.1007/s00382-019-05075-7.

== Season effects ==
This is a table of all storms in the 1936 North Indian Ocean cyclone season. It mentions all of the season's storms and their names, duration, peak intensities according to the IMD storm scale, damage, and death totals. Damage and death totals include the damage and deaths caused when that storm was a precursor wave or extratropical low. All of the damage figures are in 1936 USD.

Name	Dates	Peak intensity			Areas affected	Damage (USD)	Deaths	Ref(s).
Name	Dates	Category	Wind speed	Pressure	Areas affected	Damage (USD)	Deaths	Ref(s).
One	April 22 – 26	Very severe cyclonic storm	120 km/h (75 mph)	993 hPa (29.32 inHg)	Myanmar	Unknown	36	
Two	May 22 – 29	Very severe cyclonic storm	120 km/h (75 mph)	979 hPa (28.91 inHg)	Myanmar, Bangladesh, North India	Unknown	None	
Three	June 11 – 17	Cyclonic storm	65 km/h (40 mph)	Not specified	North India, Central India, Bangladesh	Unknown	20	
Four	June 25 – 28	Depression	≤45 km/h (30 mph)	Not specified	Myanmar	Unknown	None	
Five	June 28 – July 4	Cyclonic storm	85 km/h (50 mph)	Not specified	India (primarily Gujarat and Kerala), Pakistan, Oman	Unknown	3	
Six	July 2 – 5	Depression	≤45 km/h (30 mph)	Not specified	Myanmar, West Bengal	Unknown	None	
Seven	July 7 – 11	Depression	≤45 km/h (30 mph)	Not specified	North India	Unknown	None	
Eight	July 21 – 29	Deep depression	55 km/h (35 mph)	Not specified	India	Unknown	None	
Nine	August 17 – 18	Depression	≤45 km/h (30 mph)	Not specified	East India (primarily Odisha), Myanmar (primarily Rakhine)	Unknown	None	
Ten	August 26 – September 1	Deep depression	55 km/h (35 mph)	Not specified	North India (primarily Odisha and Andhra Pradesh), Myanmar	Unknown	None	
Eleven	September 5 – 9	Depression	≤45 km/h (30 mph)	Not specified	East India (primarily Odisha), North India	Unknown	None	
Twelve	September 29 – October 1	Depression	≤45 km/h (30 mph)	Not specified	Myanmar	Unknown	None	
Thirteen	September 29 – October 7	Very severe cyclonic storm	120 km/h (75 mph)	986 hPa (29.12 inHg)	Myanmar, Odisha, West Bengal, Bangladesh	Unknown	1	
Fourteen	October 25 – 31	Cyclonic storm	85 km/h (50 mph)	Not specified	India (primarily Andhra Pradesh)	$75,000	233	
Fifteen	November 3 – 15	Deep depression	55 km/h (35 mph)	1005 hPa (29.68 inHg)	Sri Lanka, West India (primarily Gujarat)	Unknown	None	
Sixteen	November 4 – 7	Depression	≤45 km/h (30 mph)	Not specified	Tamil Nadu	Unknown	None	
Seventeen	December 2 – 4	Depression	≤45 km/h (30 mph)	Not specified	Thailand, Andaman Islands	Unknown	None	
Eighteen	December 30 – 31	Depression	≤45 km/h (30 mph)	Not specified	Sri Lanka	Unknown	None	
Season aggregates
18 systems	April 22 – December 31		120 km/h (75 mph)	979 hPa (28.91 inHg)		$75,000	293	

== See also ==
- Tropical cyclones in 1936
- 1936 Atlantic hurricane season
- 1936 Pacific hurricane season
- 1936 Pacific typhoon season
- 1930s Australian region cyclone seasons
- 1900–1940 South Pacific cyclone seasons
- 1900–1950 South-West Indian Ocean cyclone seasons
