= 1995 in Hong Kong =

The following lists events during 1995 in British Hong Kong.

== Incumbents ==
- Monarch of the United Kingdom - Elizabeth II
- Governor - Chris Patten
- Chief Secretary - Anson Chan

== Events ==
=== January ===
- 22 January - The Miss Chinese International Pageant is held.
- 1995 Lunar New Year Cup, an exhibition association football tournament takes place 31 January – 4 February.

=== April ===
- 23 April - 14th Hong Kong Film Awards takes place.

=== June ===
- 23–26 June - 1995 Women's World Open Squash Championship is held.

=== September ===
- 17 September - 1995 Hong Kong legislative election is held.

=== Undated ===
- Pacific Access, a supply chain management and an engineering services company is founded.
- Weather Underground of Hong Kong website is established for weather and climate information.

== See also ==
- List of Hong Kong films of 1995
