= Weather Underground (weather service) =

American commercial weather service

The Weather Underground, Inc.
- Type: Subsidiary
- Founded: 1995; 31 years ago
- Founder: Jeff Masters
- Headquarters: San Francisco, California, U.S.
- Parent: The Weather Company
- Website: www.wunderground.com

Weather Underground is an American commercial weather service providing real-time weather information over the Internet. It provides weather reports for most major cities around the world on its website, as well as local weather reports for newspapers and third-party sites.

Its information comes from the National Weather Service (NWS), and over 250,000 personal weather stations (PWS). The site is available in many languages, and customers can access an ad-free version of the site with additional features for an annual fee.

In February 2024, Weather Underground and its parent company, The Weather Company, became controlled by Francisco Partners.

== History ==
The company is based in San Francisco, California and was founded in 1995 as an offshoot of the University of Michigan internet weather database. The name is a reference to the 1960s radical left-wing militant group the Weather Underground, which also originated at the University of Michigan. The founder, Jeff Masters, would later go to say, regarding the naming decision, "I regretted that, immediately,". The militant group took its name from Bob Dylan's lyric "You don't need a weatherman to know which way the wind blows", from his 1965 song "Subterranean Homesick Blues". The name, formerly UM-Weather, was changed to Weather Underground in 1991 due to feedback from the National Science Foundation in response to Perry Samson's proposal for funding. Weather Underground has since adopted the nickname Wunderground in addition to Weather Underground.

Jeff Masters, a doctoral candidate in meteorology at the University of Michigan working under the direction of Professor Perry Samson, wrote a menu-based Telnet interface in 1991 that displayed real-time weather information around the world. In 1993, they recruited Alan Steremberg and initiated a project to bring Internet weather into K–12 classrooms. Weather Underground president Alan Steremberg wrote "Blue Skies" for the project, a graphical Mac Gopher client, which won several awards. When the Mosaic Web browser appeared, this provided a natural transition from "Blue Skies" to the Web.

The original logo, used from 1997 through 2014

In 1995 Weather Underground Inc. became a commercial entity separate from the university. It has grown to provide weather for print sources, in addition to its online presence. In 2005, Weather Underground became the weather provider for the Associated Press; Weather Underground also provides weather reports for some newspapers, including the San Francisco Chronicle. Alan Steremberg also worked on the early development of the Google search engine with Larry Page and Sergey Brin.

In October 2008, Jeff Masters reported that the site was No. 2 for Internet weather information in 2008.

In February 2010, Weather Underground launched FullScreenWeather.com (now a redirect to weather.com), a full screen weather Web tool with integrated mapping and mobile device use in mind.

On July 2, 2012, The Weather Channel announced that it would acquire Weather Underground, which would become operated as part of The Weather Channel Companies, LLC, which was later renamed "The Weather Company". The Weather Underground web site continued to operate as a separate entity from The Weather Channel primary site, weather.com, with its existing staff retained. Third-party web analytics providers Alexa and SimilarWeb rated the site as the 117th and 98th most-visited site in the United States, respectively, as of July 2015. SimilarWeb rates the site as the second most visited weather website globally, attracting more than 47 million visitors per month. The Weather Company also used the site's San Francisco headquarters as a regional office.

The site's popularity also helped launch a television show hosted by meteorologist Mike Bettes, which originally aired on The Weather Channel from 1 p.m. to 5 p.m. ET. The show was renamed Weather Unfiltered on May 13, 2024 and moved to 6 p.m. to 10 p.m. as of October 29, 2024 as part of a major schedule adjustment for the network.

On October 28, 2015, Jeff Masters noted that IBM had officially announced an agreement to acquire The Weather Company's mobile and cloud-based Web properties, including Weather Underground, WSI, weather.com, and also the Weather Company brand. The Weather Channel television service remained a separate entity, later sold to Entertainment Studios in 2018. The deal was finalized on January 29, 2016.

On October 3, 2019, Jeff Masters announced that he would be leaving Weather Underground.

On August 22, 2023, IBM agreed to sell The Weather Company to private equity firm Francisco Partners for an undisclosed sum. After the acquisition of the company was completed in February 2024, Weather Underground also became controlled by the American private equity firm.

== Blogs ==
Web logs (blogs) were one of the main features in Weather Underground, allowing users of the site to create blogs about weather, everyday life and anything else. Jeff Masters started the first blog on April 14, 2005, and he posts blog entries nearly every day. From 2007 through early 2017 Richard B. Rood wrote blogs on climate change and societal response, with new entries on a weekly basis.

On October 14, 2016, the Wunderblog announced that it would be changing their name to Category 6, a name suggested by Jeff Masters. They decided on the name, because it "alludes to our deep fascination with all types of weather and climate extremes, including the many important facets of our changing climate", and "will provide all the insight and expert analysis needed to put the extreme events of our evolving 21st-century climate into context."

On April 3, 2017 Weather Underground ended all Member blogs, WUMail, SMS alerts, NOAA Weather Radio rebroadcast and Aviation.

== Services ==
Weather Underground also uses observations from members with automated personal weather stations (PWS). Weather Underground uses observations from over 250,000 personal weather stations worldwide.

The Weather Underground's WunderMap overlays weather data from personal weather stations and official National Weather Service stations on a Mapbox Map base and provides many interactive and dynamically updated weather and environmental layers. On November 15, 2017, users were notified by email that their worldwide, user-provided weather cameras would cease to be available on December 15, 2017. However, on December 11, 2017 users received another email from Weather Underground announcing that they were reversing their position and would not be discontinuing the service based on significant user feedback.

The service previously distributed Internet radio feeds of NOAA Weather Radio stations from across the country, as provided by users, and had a Weather Underground Braille Page.

The Associated Press uses Weather Underground to provide national weather summaries.

Weather Underground has several Google Chrome extensions and applications for iPhone, iPad and Android including FullScreenWeather.com, a redirect to a full screen weather viewer tied into OpenStreetMap. There was an app developed for Roku devices, which has been deleted.

In February 2015, Weather Underground released an iOS app called Storm. This app is universal, and can be used on both iPhone and iPad. Other apps by Weather Underground include WunderStation for iPad and WunderMap for iOS and Android. In 2017, Weather Underground removed support for Storm, in favor of the "Storm Radar" app released by The Weather Channel Interactive in June 2017.

On December 31, 2018, Weather Underground ceased offering its popular application programming interface (API) for weather data, further reducing the breadth of its services.

On September 10, 2019, Weather Underground announced the discontinuation of its Email Forecast Program as of October 1, 2019, continuing the reduction in services noted above.

== See also ==
- WUHU (software)
- Weather Underground of Hong Kong
