= Jeff Masters =

- Alma mater: University of Michigan
- Employer: National Oceanic and Atmospheric Administration (1986–1990); SUNY Brockport; Weather Underground (1995–2019)

Jeffrey Mason Masters (Jeff Masters) is an American meteorologist and co-founder of the privately owned online weather information company Weather Underground, later acquired by The Weather Company, parent company of The Weather Channel.

== Biography ==
Jeff Masters grew up in the suburbs of Detroit. He earned his B.Sc. in 1982 and his M.Sc. in 1983 in meteorology from the University of Michigan, participating in acid rain measurement campaigns in the northeastern United States and air pollution surveys in the Detroit area.

In 1986, he taught weather forecasting techniques to B.Sc. students at the State University of New York at Brockport, New York, before joining NOAA's hurricane hunters in Miami. He co-authored several technical reports during his four years in that position, as well as appearing in some television documentaries.

After nearly being killed during a flight in Hurricane Hugo, Jeff Masters left his job in 1990 to return to the University of Michigan to pursue a doctorate in air pollution, which he earned in 1997. His dissertation was titled "Vertical Transport of Carbon Monoxide by Mid-Latitude Winter Storms."

During the same period, Jeff Masters was working on a menu-driven telnet interface providing weather information under the supervision of Professor Perry Samson. By 1992, this site had become one of the most popular on the fledgling internet. In 1993, Alan Steremberg was hired to create a more sophisticated site. From this site, Masters and Steremberg founded Weather Underground in Ann Arbor in 1995. Jeff remains its director of meteorology until October 3, 2019, when he announced that he would be leaving Weather Underground. He then did a blog for Scientific American for one year and now writes about extreme weather and climate change for Yale Climate Connections.
