= WUHU (software) =

- Original author: Heath Smith
- Developer: Heath Smith
- Stable release: 1.0.216.228 / May 29, 2026; 3 months ago
- Written in: C++
- Operating system: Microsoft Windows
- Available in: English
- Type: Remote sensing software
- Website: https://www.wxforum.net/index.php?board=106.0

Weather Underground / HeavyWeather Uploader, commonly WUHU, is a free software package for Microsoft Windows which allows users with Personal Weather Stations to contribute weather data to one of several networks, including:

- Weather Underground (https://www.wunderground.com/)
- Weathercloud (https://app.weathercloud.net/signup)
- Citizen Weather Observer Program (also known as CWOP, https://madis.ncep.noaa.gov/madis_cwop.shtml)
- WOW-BE (wow.metoffice.gov.uk replacement after Oct 2026, https://wow.meteo.be/en/connect-your-station/)
- AWEKAS (https://www.awekas.at/main/en/)
- PWS Weather (https://www.pwsweather.com/contributor-plan)

retrieved 2012-12-31</ref>

- YoWindow
- Australian Weather Network
- UK Weather Net

It can collect data from multiple models of weather stations from La Crosse Technology, Davis Instruments, and Oregon Scientific.
