= Pacific Access =

Pacific Access Ltd.
- Company type: Limited
- Available in: English, Arabic, Cyrillic and Turkish
- Founded: 1995
- Headquarters: Hong Kong, China
- Area served: Worldwide
- Industry: Supply Chain Management
- Products: Various
- Employees: 100
- Website: Pacific-access.com

Pacific Access is a supply chain management and an engineering services company registered in Hong Kong, providing buying, production management, supply chain, trade management services and contract manufacturing. The company was incorporated in 1995 in Hong Kong and offers a multitude of products and production services. According to the company's website, www.pacific-access.com, they employ over 100 people and is the largest Turkish company in Asia. Pacific Access' main customers are Beko, Grundig, Arçelik, Migros Türk, Turk Traktor, Network and Aygaz providing supplier management, supply chain management and engineering services. One case study from its website stated they successfully help launched Arcelik's robot mascot.

Pacific Access is one of China's largest exporters of high-quality consumer electrical appliances, managing over 7000 forty foot container in 2008.

== Products ==
Pacific Access sells a range of electrical appliances and consumer electronics to distributors, wholesalers and importers. The range of appliances and consumer electronics include air-conditioners, heaters, small kitchen appliances, household appliances, wine coolers, MP3 players, digital photo frame and USB drives. Because of its diverse customers, Pacific Access also sells general merchandise products like ceramics household products, furniture, housewares and high quality pashminas.

== Services ==
Pacific Access specializes in developing high-quality plastic injection molds and products. It also offers a complete service from initial design to the assembly. Services include product development, engineering and manufacturing.

== Business Model And Shipping Methods ==
Because of the volume of products that Pacific Access buys directly from the factory, it has secured competitive prices throughout the year that they then sell to wholesalers, distributors, and importers, helping businesses sourcing products in China.
