= The Weather Company =

Weather forecasting and information technology company

The Weather Company LLC
- Type: Private
- Industry: Information technology Weather forecasting
- Founded: July 18, 1980; 46 years ago (as The Weather Channel); October 21, 2012; 14 years ago (as the Weather Company)
- Headquarters: 1001 Summit Blvd NE, Brookhaven, Atlanta, Georgia, U.S.
- Key people: Rohit Agarwal (CEO)
- Owner: Francisco Partners (2024–present)
- Parent: Landmark Communications (1980–2008); NBCUniversal, Bain Capital, The Blackstone Group (2008–2016): IBM (2016–2024)
- Subsidiaries: Weather Underground; WSI Corporation
- Website: www.weathercompany.com

The Weather Company LLC is a weather forecasting and information technology company that owns and operates the Weather Channel app and its website weather.com and Weather Underground; it also owns the Weather Channel brand. The Weather Company also produces a weather API of data and analytics tools used in advertising and aviation. The company originated from the Weather Channel, founded in 1980, and was restructured in 2012 to distinguish its media (the Weather Channel) and data (the Weather Company) operations. From 2016 to 2023, the Weather Company was a subsidiary of the Watson & Cloud Platform business unit of IBM. In February 2024, the private equity firm Francisco Partners completed the acquisition of the Weather Company, which operates as a standalone company.

== History and operations ==
The Weather Company started as The Weather Channel in 1980, and launched two years later. That same year, the company developed the first version of its Pilotbrief product providing pilots with weather information for route planning. In 2012, the company created a broader holding company and replaced the word "Channel" with "Company" to better reflect their growing lineup of digital products.

The Weather Company was previously owned by a consortium made up of the Blackstone Group, Bain Capital, and NBCUniversal. That consortium sold the Weather Company's product and technology assets to IBM on January 29, 2016, but retained possession of the Weather Channel cable network until March 2018, when it was sold to Entertainment Studios. As part of the 2016 spin-off, the consortium entered into a long-term licensing agreement with IBM for use of its weather data and "The Weather Channel" name and branding. As a result, while the Weather Company does not operate the Weather Channel television network, it owns the Weather Channel brand and continues to operate the Weather Channel app and web site weather.com and provide the weather data used on the Weather Channel television network.

In 2019, The Weather Company launched its global high-resolution atmospheric forecasting system (GRAF).

In August 2023, IBM agreed to sell the Weather Company and its assets (including the Weather Channel mobile app, weather.com, Weather Underground, and Storm Radar) to private equity firm Francisco Partners.

In February 2024, Francisco Partners completed the acquisition of the Weather Company, which operates as a standalone company. The cost was disclosed as $1.1 billion, with $750 million in cash, $100 million deferred over seven years, and $250 million in contingent consideration. Also in 2024, The Weather Company signed a deal with Nvidia to create an AI weather forecasting tool.

In March 2025, The Weather Company implemented the Joint Effort for Data Assimilation Integration (JEDI) in its global high-resolution atmospheric forecasting system (GRAF).) JEDI was developed at the Joint Center for Satellite Data Assimilation, a research center within the University Corporation for Atmospheric Research. In April 2025, the company introduced Maverick Dispatch, a cloud-based software tool for airline dispatchers to manage weather-related issues. In September 2025, The Weather Company released smart NOTAMs, which use AI to categorize and summarize aviation notices for pilots and dispatchers.

== Products ==
The Weather Company's products include The Weather Channel app and website, Weather Underground, and Storm Radar, an app for tracking storms and hurricanes. As of July 2025, Similarweb ranked weather.com as the most popular weather site, with 1.2 billion monthly visits. Weather Underground's site accumulated another 66.4 million monthly visits.

The Weather Channel mobile app, operated by The Weather Company, was ranked by Similarweb as the top weather app in both the Google Play Store and the Apple App Store as of August 2025. As of April 2025, the app had more than 360 million users. A September 2024 analysis by the University of Reading commissioned by The i Paper found that The Weather Channel app was the best overall app for weather forecast accuracy. In February 2025, the app added a "probabilistic snowfall" feature for paid users to receive more granular data about projected amounts of snow.

The company's weather graphics platform, Max, generates the green screen weather maps used in local news. In 2024 The Weather Company released ReelSphere, an AI tool for broadcasters that integrates with Max to add hyperlocal information to video weather reports, with data pulled from The Weather Company's API. Google also uses The Weather Company's API for weather information.

Weatherverse Planner is a plug-in created by The Weather Company to provide real-time weather data, forecasts, and risk analytics to third-party tools, including software used for military applications.

=== Aviation ===
The Weather Company's aviation-related tools support 25,000 flights daily as of 2025. Fusion is a tool that combines weather, airspace, and flight information to facilitate operational decision-making. Another aviation product by the company is Pilotbrief, originally developed in 1980. Pilotbrief provides pilots with route planning information and contextual weather data, including icing and turbulence forecasts.

Maverick Dispatch is a cloud-based software tool for airline dispatchers to manage weather-related issues. The tool incorporates predictive analytics and uses The Weather Company's Global High-Resolution Atmospheric Forecasting (GRAF) system to visualize weather. Breeze Airways and Horizon Air both use Maverick Dispatch. The Weather Company develops smart NOTAMs, which use AI to categorize and summarize aviation notices for pilots and dispatchers. The feature was first available in Maverick Dispatch.

=== Advertising ===
The Weather Company provides some weather-based advertising tools allowing advertisers to access weather-related analytics and target users based on contextual cues like pollen forecasts or high temperatures. The company works with brands to forecast demand based on weather data in its AI-based platform. It also sells ads in The Weather Channel app.

== See also ==
- List of mergers and acquisitions by IBM
- List of meteorology institutions
