= 1936 Pacific hurricane season =

Seasonal boundaries
- First system formed: June 8, 1936
- Last system dissipated: December 4, 1936

Strongest storm
- Name: Seven
  - Lowest pressure: 974 mbar (hPa; 28.76 inHg)

Seasonal statistics
- Total storms: 8
- Hurricanes: 4
- Total fatalities: 2
- Total damage: $15,000 (1936 USD)

Related articles
- 1936 Atlantic hurricane season; 1936 Pacific typhoon season; 1930s North Indian Ocean cyclone seasons

The 1936 Pacific hurricane season ran through the summer and fall of 1936. Before the satellite age started in the 1960s, data on east Pacific hurricanes was extremely unreliable. Most east Pacific storms were of no threat to land. There are numerous damaging tropical cyclones during the season, and half of tropical cyclones during the season became hurricanes.

== Systems ==
=== Tropical Storm One ===
Just off the coast of Guatemala, a tropical storm was reported on June 8. It headed north, and sometime after June 9 made landfall. It crossed the isthmus, and it emerged into the Gulf of Honduras. The system then became the first tropical storm of the 1936 Atlantic hurricane season. This cyclone's lowest measured pressure while located in the Pacific Ocean was 29.67 inHg (100.5 kPa). This tropical storm caused heavy rains over parts of Central America, especially the Yucatán and British Honduras.

=== Possible Tropical Cyclone Two ===
On June 22, there was a possible tropical cyclone some ways south of Acapulco. A ship reported a pressure reading of 29.49 inHg (99.9 kPa).

=== Hurricane Three ===
About or before 5 August, a tropical cyclone formed southwest of Cape Corrientes. It tracked along the coast and reached hurricane intensity for a time. It entered the Gulf of California and moved up its entire length, weakening as it went north-northwestward. The tropical storm made landfall near the head of the Gulf of California on 8 August and dissipated inland. The lowest pressure reported was 29.39 inHg (99.5 kPa). On 8 August in consequence of this tropical storm, San Diego, California, recorded a maximum wind velocity of 26 mph (42 km/h; 23 kn) from the south and a temperature of 34 °C (94 °F). The wind whipped tender plants west of San Diego but did little other damage in California. Remnants of this tropical cyclone contributed locally heavy rain over parts of southern California and Arizona on 9 August. A wind and rain storm struck central and southeast Arizona on 8 August, causing $15,000 in damage. Floods washed out railroad tracks near Tucson, and the storm blocked highways and disrupted railway, bus, and airline schedules. In Phoenix, winds swept roofs away and uprooted trees. Two persons suffered injury as the storm demolished their home.

=== Hurricane Four ===
On August 17, a hurricane was located south of Cabo San Lucas. It rapidly moved north along the Pacific side of the Baja California peninsula. It was last detected in a much weakened state on August 18. The lowest pressure reading was 28.82 inHg (97.6 kPa).

The hurricane caused serious damage to fishing vessels. Two that had sought refuge in Magdalena Bay were driven aground. Another, the Enterprise, was destroyed on Tosco Point. Its crew of twelve were rescued by the Panama Pacific liner California.

=== Hurricane Five ===
A tropical cyclone formed near Cape Corrientes on September 8. It moved north, intensified into a hurricane, and made landfall near Cabo San Lucas late on September 9. It had dissipated by September 10. The lowest pressure reading reported for this system was 29.25 inHg (99.1 kPa).

=== Possible Tropical Cyclone Six ===
From September 24 to 26, a tropical cyclone might have existed in the waters off Manzanillo and south of the Gulf of California.

=== Hurricane Seven ===
On October 27, an area of low pressure existed. By October 28, it had intensified into a hurricane. A ship reported a pressure 28.78 inHg (97.5 kPa). On October 29, a ship in subtropical latitudes low that was the remnant of this hurricane.

=== Tropical Depression Eight ===
On December 4, a northward-moving tropical depression passed over some of the Hawaiian Islands. Its only apparent impact was to cause intensification of the trade winds.

== See also ==
- 1936 Atlantic hurricane season
- 1936 Pacific typhoon season
- 1930s North Indian Ocean cyclone seasons
- 1900–1940 South Pacific cyclone seasons
- 1900–1950 South-West Indian Ocean cyclone seasons
- 1930s Australian region cyclone seasons
