= 1936 Pacific typhoon season =

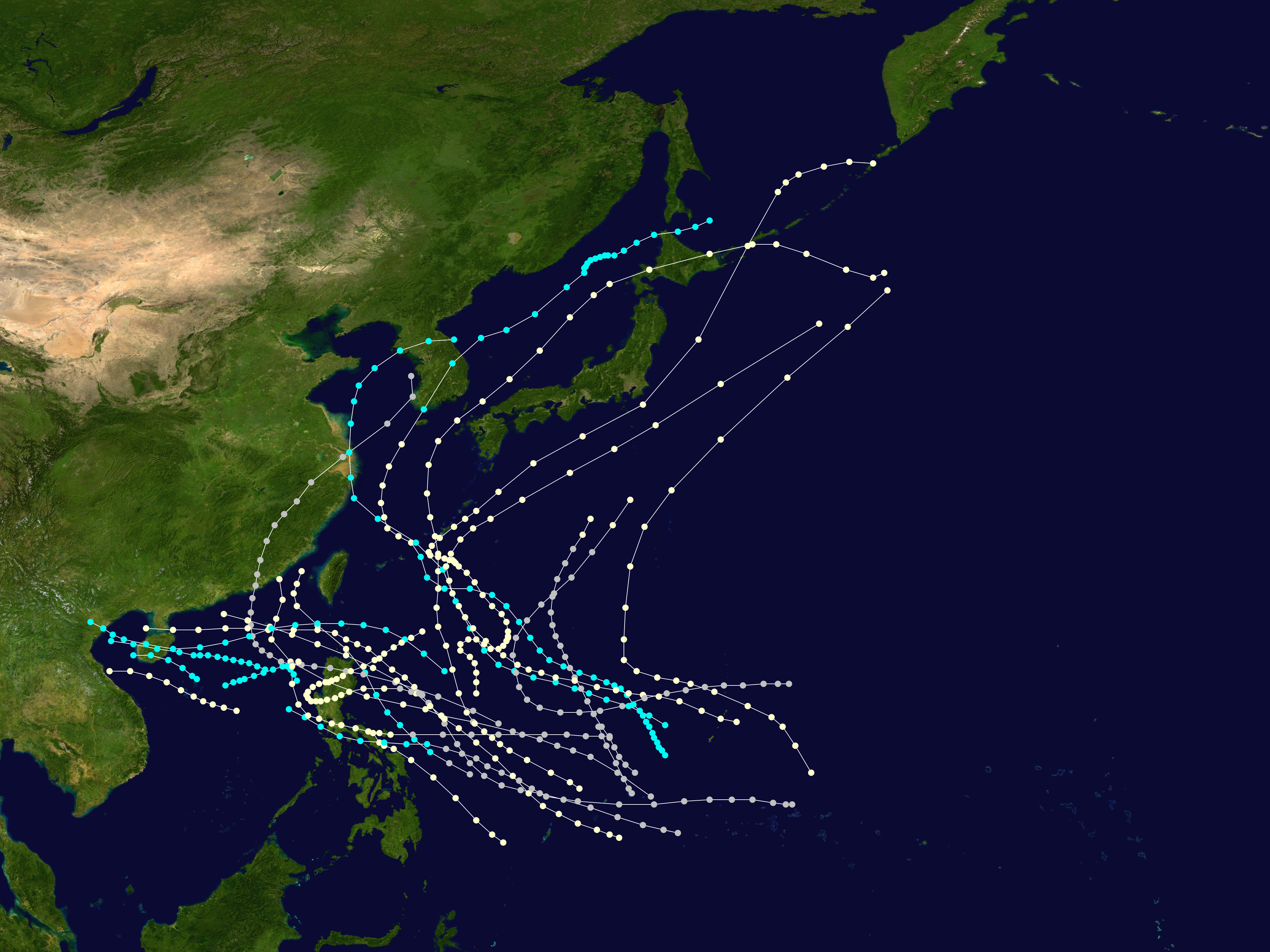
- Season summary map

Seasonal boundaries
- First system formed: April 20, 1936
- Last system dissipated: December 26, 1936

Strongest storm
- Name: Ten
  - Lowest pressure: 913 hPa (mbar)

Seasonal statistics
- Total depressions: 33
- Typhoons: 19
- Total fatalities: 2,341
- Total damage: Unknown

Related articles
- 1936 Atlantic hurricane season; 1936 Pacific hurricane season; 1930s North Indian Ocean cyclone seasons

In 1936, there were 33 tropical cyclones across the northwestern Pacific Ocean, north of the equator and west of the International Date Line, including two that persisted from the previous year. There were at least 19 typhoons, which are tropical cyclones with sustained winds of at least 119 kilometres per hour (74 mph). The year's strongest observed typhoon was in August, when the Fathomer rode out the storm in along the northern Philippines island of Luzon, observing a barometric pressure of 913 mbar (26.96 inHg). The typhoon killed 20 people, one of several deadly tropical cyclones in the year. Also in August, a typhoon crossed the Korean peninsula, killing 1,516 people, with another 1,183 people injured. In October, another typhoon moved across Luzon, killing 546 people.

The basin's first tropical cyclone of the year originated on April 20, which killed seven people in the Philippines. In July, there were two deadly Philippine typhoons, as well as a deadly typhoon that affected Japan. In August, a typhoon in the South China Sea caused several shipwrecks, killing 68 people. There was another Japanese typhoon in September that killed 70 people, including 60 from a shipwreck. In November, a Philippine typhoon killed one person, followed by another typhoon in December that killed 74 people. The final depression of the year dissipated on December 26.

== Systems ==
=== January–June ===
As the year began, there were two tropical depressions active across the western Pacific. The westernmost one originated on December 29, and moved through the Visayas in the central Philippines before dissipating on January 3 in the South China Sea. It produced heavy rainfall along its track. The other depression formed on December 31 in the Caroline Islands, and also dissipated on January 3.

On April 20, a tropical cyclone formed east of the Philippines island of Mindanao. The system moved northwestward, crossing the eastern Visayas and Luzon before dissipating late on April 22. The New York Times reported that seven people died during the Philippines storm.

On June 29, a tropical cyclone formed in the South China Sea. It moved northwestward, striking the Chinese island of Hainan the next day, before dissipating.

=== July ===
On July 1, a typhoon formed east of the Philippines island of Samar. The system moved to the northwest, brushing Luzon on July 4, but sparing the island from strong winds. The typhoon moved across the Luzon Strait before weakening, making landfall in southeastern China near Shantou on July 5. The storm turned northeastward and dissipated by July 6.

Between July 2–4, a low pressure area was located over the Caroline Islands, which organized into a depression by July 5 to the northeast of Yap. The system moved west-northwestward toward the Philippines and intensified. On July 8, the S.S. Barentsz encountered the storm, observing a minimum pressure of 970 mbar (28.65 inHg) as well as typhoon-force winds. On the next day, the typhoon made landfall in northeastern Luzon near Tuguegarao, Cagayan, where an anemometer recorded a pressure of 991 mbar (29.27 inHg). The typhoon weakened after crossing Luzon, eventually moving northward into China on July 10, where it soon dissipated. In Tuguegarao where the storm first moved ashore, two people died due to fallen trees. The typhoon sank the M.S. Marie near Palanan, killing 23 people.

On July 16, a depression was located northwest of Yap. The system moved northwestward and intensified, later turning northward through Japan's Ryukyu Islands on July 21. At that time, the system was a "severe disturbance", according to the Monthly Weather Review (MWR). After turning northeastward, the typhoon passed near the west coast of Kyushu before entering the Sea of Japan on July 23. A day later, the storm crossed Hokkaido, and was last reported on July 25. Across Japan, the typhoon killed seven people, while 4,000 houses were flooded. The storm wrecked fishing boats and also washed a navy ship and a submarine ashore the city of Sasebo.

On July 18, a depression developed in the South China Sea southwest of Manila. It moved to the northwest and intensified into a typhoon by July 19. After turning to the west, the typhoon struck what is now Vietnam on July 21, and it quickly dissipated over land.

A depression began developing on July 22 between Yap and Palau. It moved to the west-northwest toward the Philippines, slowing its forward motion on July 27. Subsequently, the system intensified as it turned northwestward. On July 29, the typhoon moved across Luzon, producing heavy rainfall and killing seven people. The typhoon strengthened further in the South China Sea as it turned to the north. On August 1, Pratas Island recorded a minimum pressure of 953 mbar (28.14 inHg). That day, the typhoon struck southeastern China near Shantou. The storm weakened over land as it moved through eastern China, re-emerging into the East China Sea on August 3. A day later, the storm was last reported near the Korean peninsula.

A depression formed on July 26 over the western Caroline Islands. The system moved west-northwestward without much development, dissipating on August 3 to the east of Luzon.

=== August ===
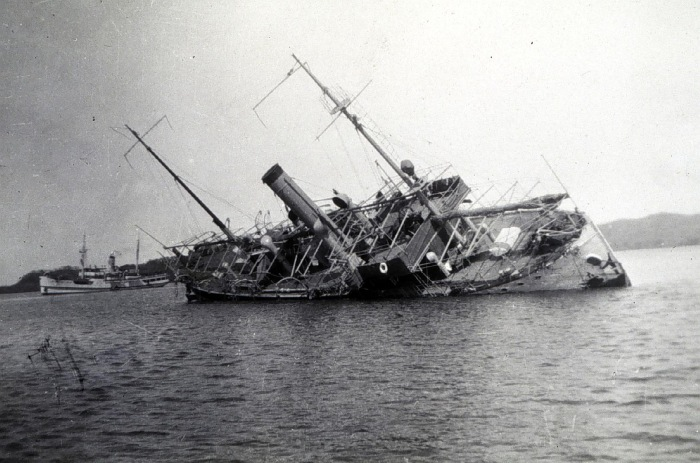
The grounded USC&GS Fathomer on August 15 due to a typhoon

On August 6, a depression formed northeast of Yap, which proceeded west-northwesterly. The system intensified into a typhoon as it passed east of the Philippines. On August 12, the typhoon moved through the Batanes islands, with a pressure of 995 mbar (29.34 inHg) reported at Basco. Turning westward, the storm moved across the South China Sea, crossing China's Hainan island into the Gulf of Tonkin on August 14. It soon moved ashore and dissipated.

Newspapers reported a typhoon in the South China Sea on August 7 that wrecked nine Japanese fishing vessels, killing 68 people, with 136 people rescued. However, the August MWR did not record a storm on that date in that location.

A depression originated on August 11 east-southeast of Yap, which moved to the west-northwest. The system quickly intensified, and was already at typhoon intensity by the time it passed 120 mi (195 km) south of Yap. After continuing northwestward, the typhoon brushed northeastern Luzon. On August 15, the Fathomer rode out the storm at Port San Vicente, recording a minimum pressure of 913 mbar (26.96 inHg). Curving northwestward, the typhoon eventually passed near northeastern Luzon on August 16, just four days after another storm in the region. Aparri in the Philippine province of Cagayan recorded a pressure of 948 mbar (28.01 inHg). Across the Philippines, the typhoon killed 11 people, and also destroyed 90% of the crops in the Cagayan Valley. Proceeding into the South China Sea, the typhoon made landfall in southern China near August 17 near Hong Kong, which recorded gusts of 131 mph (211 km/h) and a pressure of 984 mbar (29.07 inHg). Newspapers described it as the most severe typhoon since 1923. Across the region, the typhoon grounded, damaged, or destroyed 60 ships, while also wrecking houses and buildings. The Hong Kong Observatory ascribed 20 deaths to the typhoon.

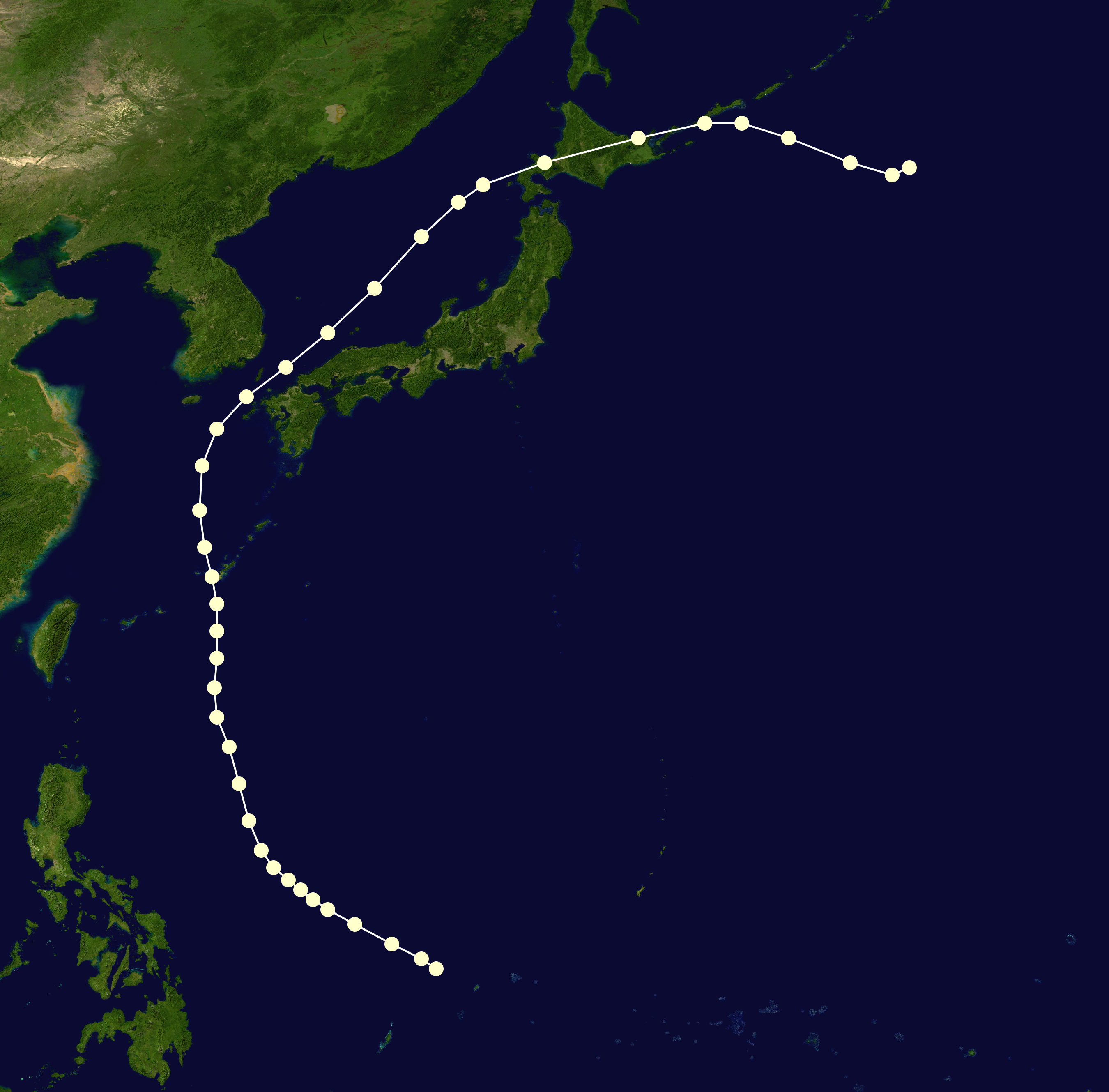
Track map of the deadly Korean typhoon

On August 18, a depression formed southwest of Guam. It moved northwestward, and by August 25 was a "storm of considerable intensity", according to the MWR. Soon after, the typhoon moved through the Ryukyu Islands, passing about 100 mi (160 km) southwest of Okinawa. A day later, the typhoon recurved to the north and later northeast. On August 27, the typhoon struck what is now South Korea, and quickly crossed the Korean peninsula into the Sea of Japan. The typhoon continued northeastward across the Sea of Japan, crossing Sakhalin Island on September 1. The typhoon killed 1,516 people across the Korean peninsula, with another 1,183 people injured. The storm wrecked 36,000 houses, with thousands more inundated by floodwaters.

A depression was located over the South China Sea on August 24. Largely stationary, the system intensified slightly. On August 28, the storm moved across China's Hainan island, through the Gulf of Tonkin, and into what is now Vietnam.

On August 28, a depression formed northeast of Yap, which proceeded northwestward. On September 2, it moved through the Ryukyu Island as a typhoon. A day later, the typhoon brushed eastern China while recurving northward. It later crossed over the Korean peninsula on September 4, dissipating a day later.

On August 30, a depression developed over the Marianas Islands. The system moved generally northwestward until September 4, when it passed between Luzon and Taiwan and started moving to the west. Pratas Island recorded a pressure of 1002 mbar (29.60 inHg). The depression crossed China's Hainan island on September 6, and a day later moved ashore what is now northern Vietnam.

=== September ===
On September 7, the S.S. Malayan Prince encountered a typhoon in the open western Pacific Ocean, recording typhoon-force winds and a minimum pressure of 1007 mbar (29.74 mbar).

A depression formed on September 8 east of Luzon. It moved northwestward without developing, dissipating on September 11.

Another depression formed on September 10 northeast of Guam. The system moved westward, eventually dissipating on September 16 east of Taiwan.

On September 22, a depression formed between Luzon and Guam. For the next four days, the system meandered without much development, eventually taking a northwest path on September 27 toward the Ryukyu Islands. On October 1, the typhoon slowed and made its closest approach to Okinawa, where a pressure of 982 mbar (29.005 inHg) was recorded in Okinawa. The typhoon turned northeastward and brushed the coast of southern Honshu, passing south of Tokyo on October 3. The system was last observed on October 5 near the Kuril Islands. Across Japan, the typhoon killed 70 people, including 60 fatalities related to the sinking of the Kashima Maru. The typhoon also flooded about 4,000 houses.

A depression formed in the South China Sea on September 26. On the next day, the S.S. President Garfield recorded a pressure of 997 mbar (29.44 inHg). The depression did not move much, and it dissipated on September 30.

=== October ===
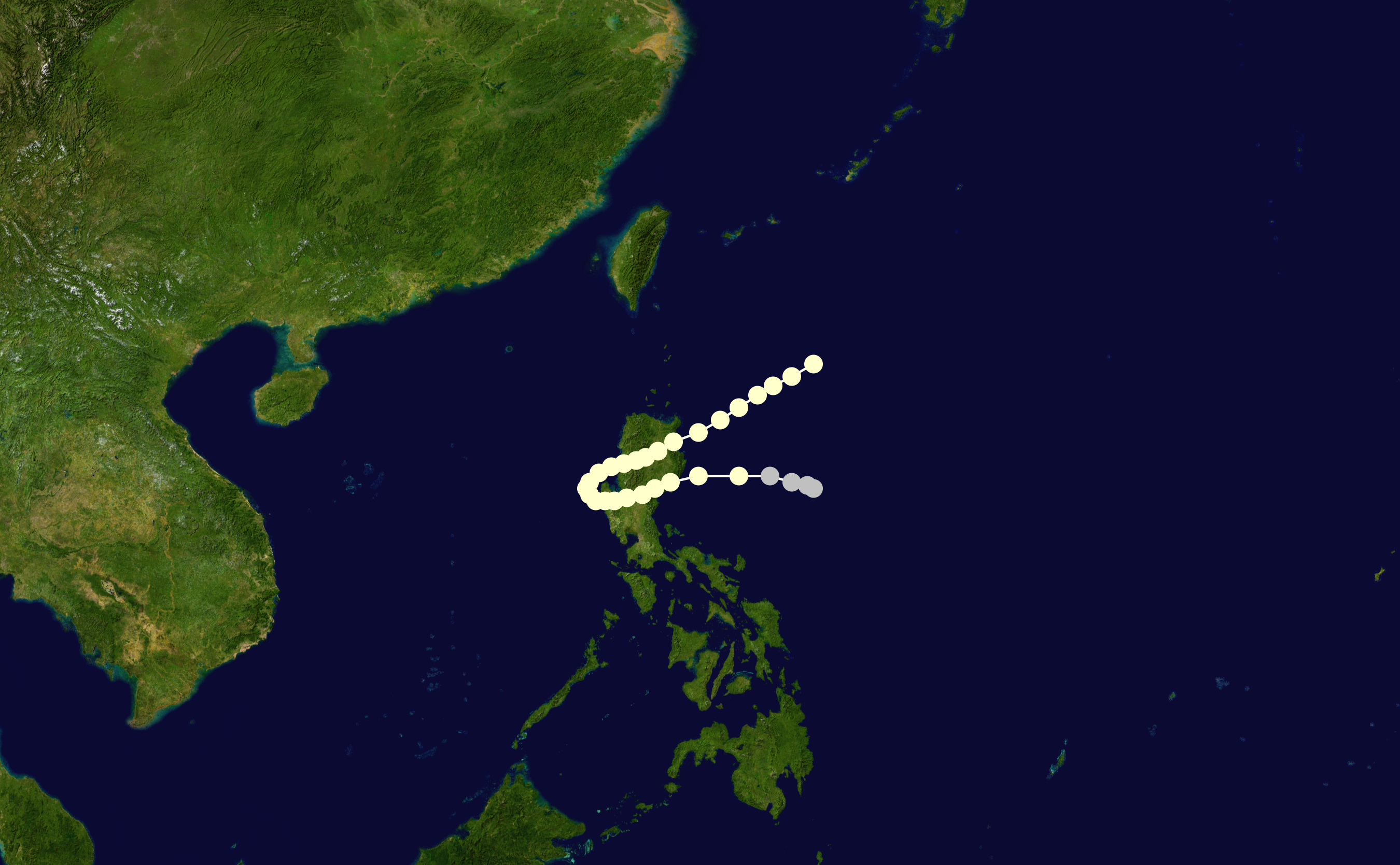
Track map of the October typhoon in the Philippines

On October 7, a trough produced two depressions – one east of the Philippines, and the other forming between Yap and Guam. The western system moved toward Luzon and intensified into a typhoon. On October 9, it made landfall in Philippines' Isabela Province. Echague recorded a minimum pressure of 976 mbar (28.818 inHg) during the typhoon's passage. The storm weakened over land and re-emerged into the South China Sea on October 11. There, it became nearly stationary, influenced by a building anticyclone to the north. On October 13, the former typhoon struck western Luzon, "very much weakened" as described by the MWR. Continuing to the northeast, the system was last observed on October 15. While moving over Luzon, the typhoon dropped heavy rainfall that led to extensive river flooding, resulting in 546 fatalities. The heaviest damage was in Nueva Ecija and Zambales provinces. Across Luzon, the typhoon caused flooding along rivers, with five towns isolated and hundreds of houses destroyed. The typhoon also wrecked crops and drowned livestock.

The other depression that developed concurrently with the previous typhoon was first observed between Yap and Guam. It moved to the northwest and eventually intensified into a typhoon. Curving to the north, the typhoon passed southeast of Japan's Bonin Islands, before turning northeastward. It was last observed on October 14 crossing 150ºE.

On October 12, a depression formed northeast of Guam, which intensified into a typhoon as it west-northwestward. On October 15, a nearby ship recorded a minimum pressure of 989 mbar (29.20 inHg). On October 16, the trajectory turned to the northeast toward the Ryukyu Islands. Two days later, the typhoon recurved and accelerated northeastward, passing 60 mi (95 km) southeast of Okinawa. After passing southeast of Japan, the typhoon was last observed on October 21.

A depression was first observed on October 22 to the southeast of Guam. The depression moved northwestward until October 25, when it slowed and recurved to the northeast. The system was last observed on October 27 between the Bonin Islands and Honshu.

Another depression formed on October 25 to the northeast of the Philippines. It moved to the northwest before curving northeastward. The depression was last observed on October 28.

=== November–December ===
A depression originated over the Caroline Islands on November 1. Moving westward, it slowly strengthened, reaching typhoon status by November 6. By the next day, it weakened as it moved through the central Philippines, crossing the Visayas. Turning northwestward, the system was last observed on November 8 in the South China Sea. One person drowned in Rizal province.

On November 2, the Thistlebrae encountered a typhoon east of the Marianas Islands, reporting a pressure of 980 hPa (28.94 inHg). On November 6, the typhoon moved through the Marianas, and three days later turned to the north. On November 11, the Bonin Islands encountered the storm, reporting a pressure of 1,006 hPa (29.71 inHg).

A depression formed on November 18 over the eastern Caroline Islands. Moving northwestward, it moved through the Marianas Islands on November 19 as a typhoon. After turning to the north, the typhoon passed near the Bonin Islands on November 22, where a nearby ship recorded a pressure of 991 hPa (29.26 inHg). The storm was last observed a day later.

On November 25, a depression originated east of Mindanao. Over the next few days, it moved through the Philippines, until it was last observed on November 30 near Palawan Island in the South China Sea.

A depression that developed on November 28 in the Caroline Islands. Moving to the west-northwest, the depression intensified into a typhoon on December 1. Two days later, the typhoon moved through the central Philippines, producing heavy rainfall that led to flooding. Camarines Sur recorded a pressure of 970 hPa (28.64 inHg). After passing south of Manila, the storm emerged into the South China Sea, dissipating on December 5. The typhoon killed 74 people across the Philippines, with the heaviest damage in Isabela province.

On December 16, a depression formed over the Caroline Islands. Moving west-northwestward, the depression failed to intensify much, and it moved through the Philippines on December 19. It dissipated by December 24.

Another depression formed on December 21 over the western Caroline Islands. Three days later, the depression moved through the central Philippines, producing heavy rainfall. It dissipated on December 26 over the South China Sea.

== Season effects ==
D refers to a depression. TC refers to a tropical cyclone. TY refers to a typhoon, which is a tropical cyclone that produces sustained winds of at least 119 km/h (74 mph). The two depressions that developed in December 1935 are included.

Name	Dates	Peak intensity			Areas affected	Damage (USD)	Deaths	Ref(s).
Name	Dates	Category	Wind speed	Pressure	Areas affected	Damage (USD)	Deaths	Ref(s).
D	December 29, 1935 – January 3, 1936	Tropical Depression	Not specified	Not specified	Philippines	None	None	
D	December 31, 1935 – January 3, 1936	Tropical Depression	Not specified	Not specified	None	None	None	
TC	April 22–24	Not specified	Not specified	Not specified	Philippines	None	7	
TC	June 29–30	Not specified	Not specified	Not specified	China	None	None	
TY	July 1–5	Typhoon	⩾120 km/h (75 mph)	Not specified	Philippines, China	None	None	
TY	July 5–10	Typhoon	⩾120 km/h (75 mph)	970 hPa (28.65 inHg)	Philippines, China	None	25	
TY	July 16–25	Typhoon	⩾120 km/h (75 mph)	Not specified	Japan	None	7	
TY	July 18–21	Typhoon	⩾120 km/h (75 mph)	Not specified	Vietnam	None	None	
TY	July 22–August 4	Typhoon	⩾120 km/h (75 mph)	Not specified	Vietnam	None	7	
D	July 26 – August 3	Tropical Depression	Not specified	Not specified	Caroline Islands	None	None	
TY	August 6–14	Typhoon	⩾120 km/h (75 mph)	995 hPa (29.34 inHg)	Philippines, China	None	None	
TY	August 8	Typhoon	⩾120 km/h (75 mph)	Not specified	None	None	68	
TY	August 11–18	Typhoon	⩾120 km/h (75 mph)	913 hPa (26.96 inHg)	Philippines, China	None	20	
TY	August 18–September 1	Typhoon	⩾120 km/h (75 mph)	Not specified	Philippines, China	None	1,516	
D	August 24–28	Tropical Depression	Not specified	Not specified	China, Vietnam	None	None	
TY	August 28–September 5	Typhoon	⩾120 km/h (75 mph)	Not specified	Japan, China, Korean Peninsula	None	None	
D	August 30–September 7	Tropical Depression	Not specified	1002 hPa (29.60 inHg)	Marianas Islands, Philippines, China, Vietnam	None	None	
TY	September 7	Typhoon	⩾120 km/h (75 mph)	1007 hPa (29.74 inHg)	None	None	None	
D	September 8–11	Tropical Depression	Not specified	Not specified	None	None	None	
D	September 10–16	Tropical Depression	Not specified	Not specified	None	None	None	
TY	September 22–October 5	Typhoon	⩾120 km/h (75 mph)	982 hPa (29.005 inHg)	None	None	70	
D	September 26–30	Tropical Depression	Not specified	997 hPa (29.44 inHg)	None	None	None	
TY	October 7–15	Typhoon	⩾120 km/h (75 mph)	976 hPa (28.818 inHg)	Philippines	None	546	
TY	October 7–14	Typhoon	⩾120 km/h (75 mph)	Not specified	Bonin Islands	None	None	
TY	October 12–21	Typhoon	⩾120 km/h (75 mph)	989 hPa (29.20 inHg)	Japan	None	None	
D	October 22–27	Tropical Depression	Not specified	Not specified	None	None	None	
D	October 25–28	Tropical Depression	Not specified	Not specified	None	None	None	
TY	November 1–8	Typhoon	⩾120 km/h (75 mph)	Not specified	Philippines	None	1	
TY	November 2–11	Typhoon	⩾120 km/h (75 mph)	980 hPa (28.953 inHg)	Marianas Islands, Bonin Islands	None	None	
TY	November 18–23	Typhoon	⩾120 km/h (75 mph)	991 hPa (29.252 inHg)	Marianas Islands, Bonin Islands	None	None	
D	November 25–30	Tropical Depression	Not specified	Not specified	Philippines	None	None	
TY	November 28–December 5	Typhoon	⩾120 km/h (75 mph)	970 hPa (28.655 inHg)	Philippines	None	74	
D	December 16–24	Tropical Depression	Not specified	Not specified	Philippines	None	None	
D	December 21–26	Tropical Depression	Not specified	Not specified	Philippines	None	None	
Season aggregates
33 systems	April 22 – December 26, 1936		131 km/h (81 mph)	913 hPa (26.96 inHg)			2,341	

== See also ==
- 1936 Pacific hurricane season
- 1936 Atlantic hurricane season
- 1930s North Indian Ocean cyclone seasons
- 1900–1950 South-West Indian Ocean cyclone seasons
- 1900–1940 South Pacific cyclone seasons
- 1930s Australian region cyclone seasons
