= Weather Underground of Hong Kong =

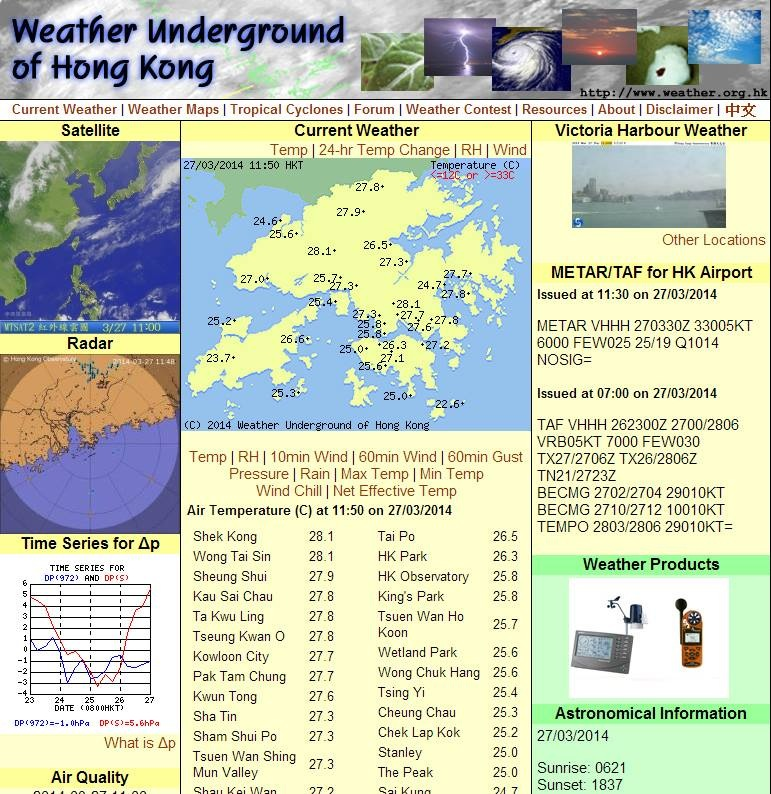
Homepage of Weather Underground in English

Weather Underground of Hong Kong (Chinese: 香港地下天文台; pinyin: xiānggǎng dìxià tiānwéntái) is a non-profit website established in 1995 and directed by Clarence Fong Chi-kong.

The website provides a wide range of information related to weather and climate. Air temperature, relative humidity, barometric pressure, rain, and wind chill can be found on the site. Radar and satellite views are also included in order to provide more comprehensive weather data to users. Information about local weather comes mainly from the Hong Kong Observatory (HKO), which collects data from foreign weather organizations, for example, satellite data originate from the Central Weather Bureau of Taiwan.

Weather Underground also established a forum, weather forecasting competition, blog and Facebook page to provide a platform for weather enthusiasts around the globe. Since the establishment of the website, it has attracted over 100 million views worldwide, becoming the most popular weather-related website beside Hong Kong Observatory.

== Background ==
=== Formation ===
Weather Underground was established in 1995 by Clarence Fong Chi-kong, in order to provide a communication platform for weather enthusiasts and experts to interact with each other. It is the first non-profit weather website in Hong Kong, subsequently becoming a community. It aims to provide wider perspectives of weather information, introduces the latest technologies, and encourages the official meteorological authority, Hong Kong Observatory, to update its technology to provide better services to Hongkongers.

By providing information from the Hong Kong Observatory as well as other meteorological and research institutions around the world, weather enthusiasts and experts can access the information for comparison and analysis to get a more complete picture of the weather. Weather Underground also provides exclusive information including weather indices (heat index, wind chill, K index, etc.), surface and upper-level SYNOP reports for Hong Kong, upper-level weather maps for East Asia, lightning location and atmospheric electric field maps, and maps of tropical cyclone forecast tracks by different countries. Weather Underground also provides a discussion forum in both Chinese and English for weather enthusiasts and experts around the globe to gather and share their ideas on weather, climate, and other related topics.

=== Founder ===
Clarence Fong Chi-kong is the founder and current director of Weather Underground of Hong Kong. Fong was an experimental officer at the Hong Kong Observatory, and is currently a committee member of the Hong Kong Meteorological Society.

== Development ==
=== Website ===
Originally the website was updated twice a day at 8 a.m. and 8 p.m., but updates are now provided automatically every 10 minutes.

In August 2007, the website of Weather Underground changed its layout and increased the information provided: current warning animation, 7-Day weather forecast, and everyday climatology were added.

=== Other media ===
A blog, ”氣象‧人‧語”, was established in May 2005 in order to share extra weather information and knowledge on weather and climate. In December 2012, the blog became a special column in Yahoo! Hong Kong.

A Facebook page for Weather Underground (香港地下天文台) was created in March 2011. The page will update if there are any weather events and warnings, such as typhoons, rainstorms, monsoons, and earthquakes.

=== Activities ===
==== Weather Forecasting Contest ====
The Weather Forecasting Contest is a competition held by Weather Underground. For each round of the contest, participants have to forecast the four elements listed below on Sunday or before 23:59:59 every Friday:

1. Minimum and maximum temperatures over Hong Kong territory,
2. Minimum and maximum relative humidity at the Hong Kong Observatory,
3. Rainfall amount at the Hong Kong Observatory,
4. Sunshine duration at King's Park, maximum UV index at King's Park

Daily weather summaries issued by the Hong Kong Observatory will be used for verification. If data are missing for any parameter, all forecasts for that parameter will be considered accurate.

The round of the weather forecasting contest lasts for about 12 weeks.

==== Member gatherings ====
Weather Underground emphasizes communication between members. Hence, they have several meetings and gatherings. Below is the information of some of recent gatherings:

Meeting Times	Date	Place	Content
29	1 September 2013	Cheung Chau	Lunch, visit the Cheung Chau Beach Weather Station (Hong Kong Observatory director, Mr Shum Chi-ming, joined the lunch event)
28	22 September 2012	Hong Kong Observatory Headquarters	Seminar with the Hong Kong Observatory director, Mr Shum Chi-ming
27	12 August 2012	Mongkok	Tea
26	16 September 2007	Lamma Island	Outing and visit to wind power station

=== Meetings with Hong Kong Observatory ===
In order to improve the services provided by the Hong Kong Observatory, Weather Underground has regular meetings with the observatory.

==== Achievements ====
In August 2006, Typhoon Prapiroon neared Hong Kong. The Hong Kong Observatory refused to raise the typhoon signal no. 8. This decision triggered intense public discussions. Weather Underground published a report later on, questioning the validity of the Tropical Cyclone Warning System for Hong Kong. This led to the revision of the system by The Hong Kong Observatory in 2007.
