= 1962 Pacific typhoon season =

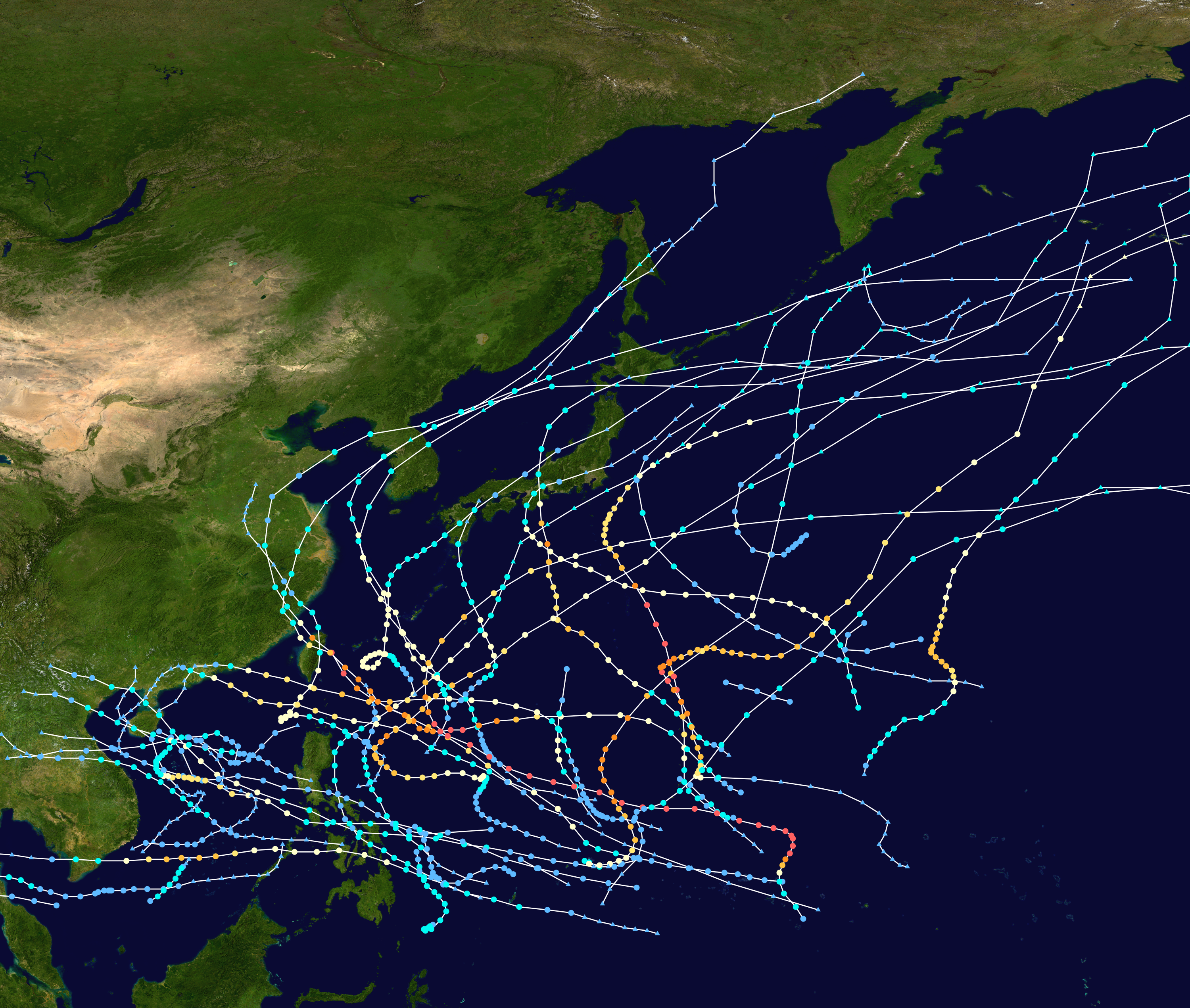
- Season summary map

Seasonal boundaries
- First system formed: February 3, 1962
- Last system dissipated: December 10, 1962

Strongest storm
- Name: Karen
  - Maximum winds: 295 km/h (185 mph) (1-minute sustained)
  - Lowest pressure: 894 hPa (mbar)

Seasonal statistics
- Total depressions: 38
- Total storms: 30
- Typhoons: 23
- Very strong typhoons: 6 (unofficial)
- Total fatalities: at least 1,700
- Total damage: $325 million (1962 USD)

Related articles
- 1962 Atlantic hurricane season; 1962 Pacific hurricane season; 1962 North Indian Ocean cyclone season

The 1962 Pacific typhoon season had no official bounds; there was activity in every month but January, March, and June, but most tropical cyclones form in the northwestern Pacific Ocean between May and November and this conventionally delimits the season.

The majority of the Pacific typhoons in 1962 formed in the Pacific Ocean north of the equator and west of the International Date Line with two exceptions: Tropical Depressions Fifty and Sixty-three formed in the Central Pacific. All tropical depressions are assigned a number. Most systems reaching tropical storm strength were assigned a name; all typhoons were named.

== Seasonal summary ==
Timeline of tropical activity in the 1962 Pacific typhoon season

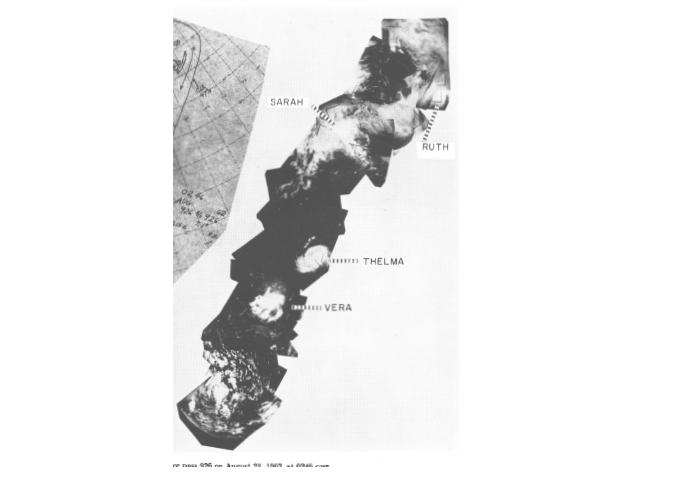
Ruth, Sarah, Thelma and Vera on August 23

Ninety tropical waves formed in the 1962 season. Only 78 of these became major easterly waves. 38 of these waves became tropical depressions, 30 became storms and 23 become typhoons. This record of 24 typhoons beat 1952 record which had 21. This record was beaten in the 1964 season with 26 typhoons. Six super typhoons formed in 1962 which were Georgia, Emma, Ruth, Opal, Amy and Karen. Even with the high activity, only about half the cyclones in 1962 made landfall. There were also seventeen suspect cyclones discovered by the JTWC in post-season reports. Three were reported to reach typhoon intensity, three at tropical storm status and two needed tropical depression warnings.

Two depressions, 50 and 63, formed in the Central Pacific under the Joint Hurricane Warning Center's (now The Central Pacific Hurricane Center) jurisdiction and were included in the JTWC archives. Both depressions stayed out to sea and had no effects on land. The Central Pacific also got Nora, Opal, Ruth, Gilda, Emma and Thelma, the remnants of Nadine and the ending of Karen near the end of the season. Six typhoons entered the Bering Sea: Nora, Opal, Ruth, Thelma, Amy and Emma. Four of the six were super typhoons. Three typhoons just missed entering the Bering Sea: Typhoons Hope, Sarah and Gilda. Also, Typhoons Georgia, Hope, Joan, Nora, Opal, Ruth, Thelma, Wanda, Amy, Emma, Gilda, Jean and Karen all lasted for at least one week with Opal lasting for eighteen straight days from a wave to the day the JMA ceased advisories.

== Systems ==
=== Tropical Storm Fran ===
- Tropical storm (JMA)
- Tropical storm (SSHWS)
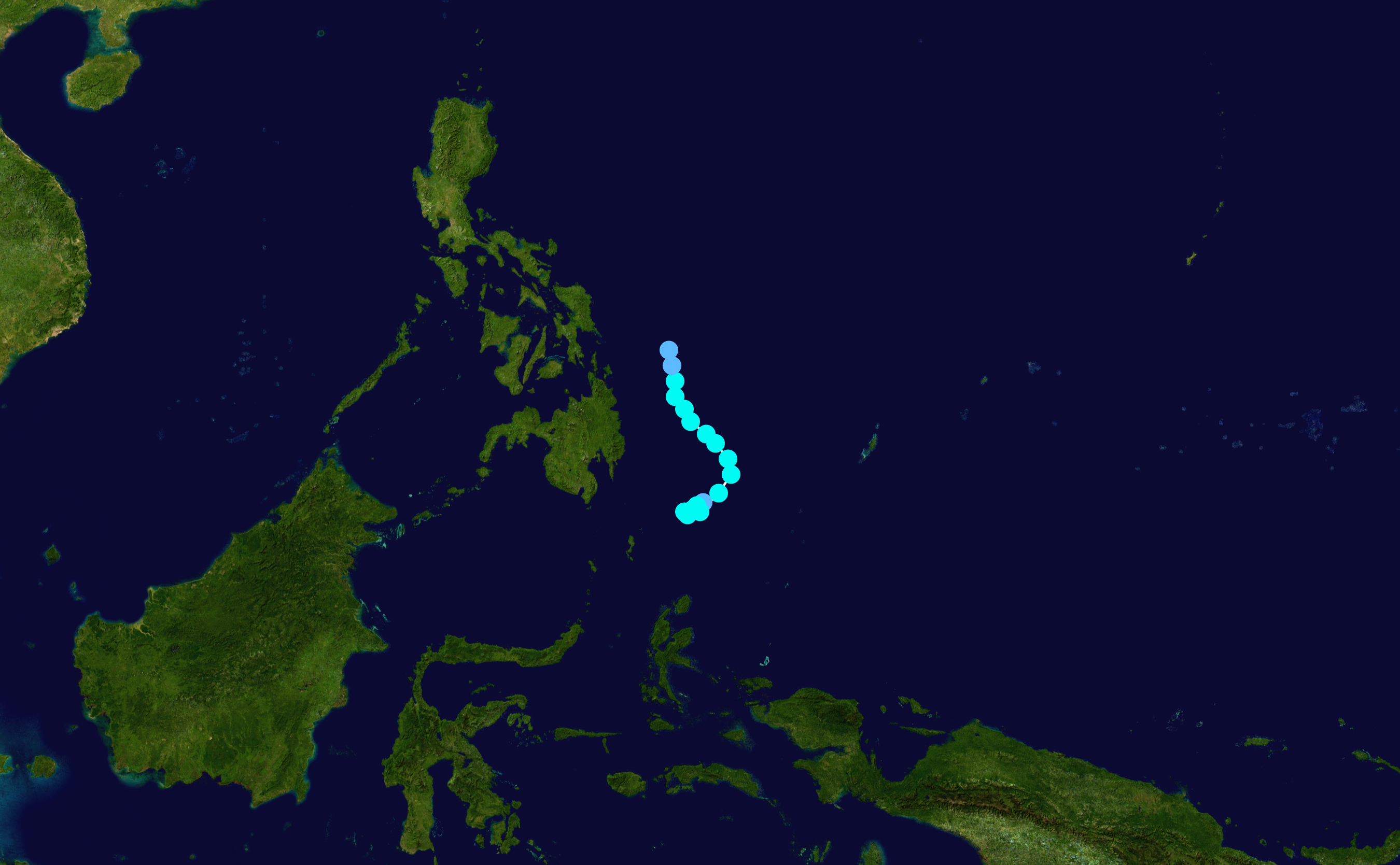
- Duration: February 3 – February 6
- Peak intensity: 85 km/h (50 mph) (1-min); 1002 hPa (mbar)

The second tropical wave of the season formed on the morning of February 2 off the southeastern coast of the Philippines. The storm quickly intensified into a tropical depression and soon into the first tropical storm of the 1962 season. The intensifying tropical cyclone went through the latter half of February 2 as a 45 mph (72 km/h) tropical storm, progressing southwest towards Indonesia. However, on the early morning of February 3, the storm curved to the northeast and away from Indonesia. The strength remained unchanged during the day and before long reached its peak winds speeds of 50 mph (80 km/h). Continuing northward away from the coast of the Philippines, Fran remained at peak winds until the evening of February 4. During the morning hours of February 5, Fran dropped down to 45 mph (72 km/h) tropical storm and continued northward, weakening to 40 mph (64 km/h). On the morning of February 6, Fran weakened into a tropical depression and the final advisory was released six hours after.

=== Typhoon Georgia ===
- Typhoon (JMA)
- Category 4-equivalent typhoon (SSHWS)
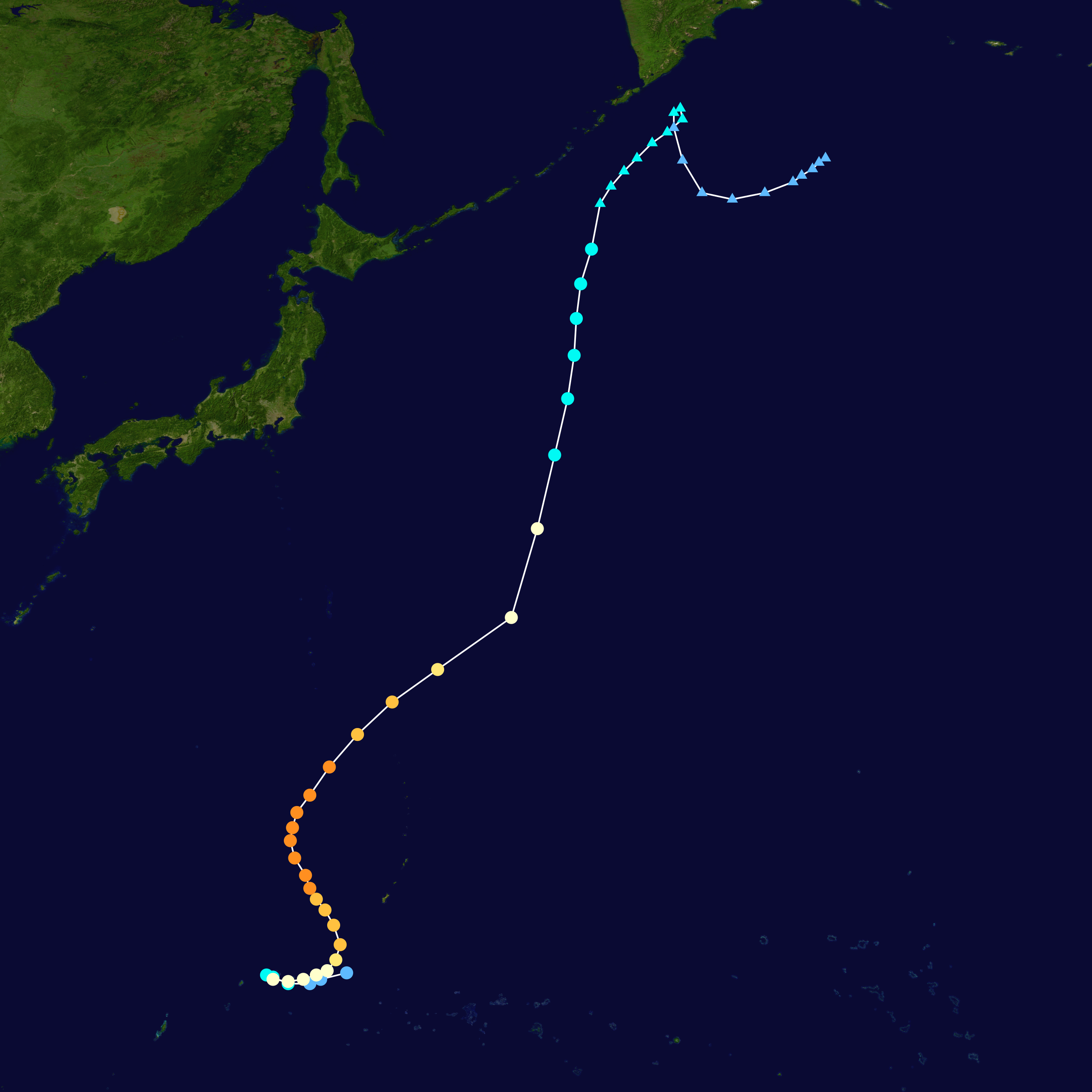
- Duration: April 15 – April 24
- Peak intensity: 240 km/h (150 mph) (1-min); 930 hPa (mbar)

A surge from an outdraft in the Southern Hemisphere entered the western Pacific on the afternoon of April 13. This surge began to come together near the island of Woleai and progressed northwestward through the Pacific. After crossing over Woleai, the system neared the island of Yap and began forming into the second tropical depression of the 1962 season. On the afternoon of April 16, the system was declared a tropical depression. The depression made a curve to the south during the north and early on April 17 reconnaissance aircraft found surface winds of 65 mph (105 km/h). The storm was upgraded to a tropical storm on April 17 as the system continued curving, turning to the east. An eye began to form during the afternoon, it got to be 50 miles (80 km) wide. The developing cyclone was declared a typhoon on the afternoon with winds of 85 mph (137 km/h). By the morning of April 18, Georgia had curved again, now to the north, gaining strength and developing an elliptical eye. Through the afternoon of April 18, Georgia continued to strengthen, reaching Category 2 status during the morning. Rapid strengthening and development continued through the afternoon, with minimum pressures of 952 millibars on the surface reported.

Entering the morning of April 19, Georgia began forming a well-defined eye, having already strengthened into a Category 3 cyclone. Intensification continued throughout the day with sustained winds reaching 145 mph (233 km/h) by the end of the day. The next morning, Typhoon Georgia reached its peak sustained winds of 150 mph (240 km/h) just west of the island of Guam. The lowest minimum pressure recorded at that point was 930 millibars. The typhoon retained its strength for most of April 20, but in the late afternoon, the system began to weaken as it entered colder waters. Georgia curved to the northeast and slowly weakened during April 21, by the end of the day, the eye was beginning to come apart. During the morning of April 22, surface winds were reported at only 90 mph (140 km/h) and sustained winds soon followed. The cold waters continued to take its toll on the system, becoming a minimal Category 1 typhoon by the evening with no well-defined eye. On the morning of April 23, Georgia weakened into a tropical storm and slowly weakened during the day as it began a transition into an extratropical cyclone. On the morning of April 24, the Joint Typhoon Warning Center ceased following the storm as it had become extratropical with winds of 60 mph (97 km/h).

The extratropical remnants of Georgia continued northward east of the coast of Japan. On April 26, the extratropical remnants passed to the southeast of the Kamchatka Peninsula. During the day, the system curved once again, turning westward before another curve to the south. During the day on April 27, the system returned to its northeastern pattern before dissipating on April 29, southeast of the peninsula.

In its wake, the predecessor system to Typhoon Georgia left 9.85 in (250 mm) in rainfall over Yap Island, where no damage was recorded. Reported damages caused by Typhoon Georgia were limited. The only report was a ship and its cargo in the Pacific suffered $28,000 in damages (1962 USD).

=== Tropical Storm Hope ===
- Tropical storm (JMA)
- Category 1-equivalent typhoon (SSHWS)
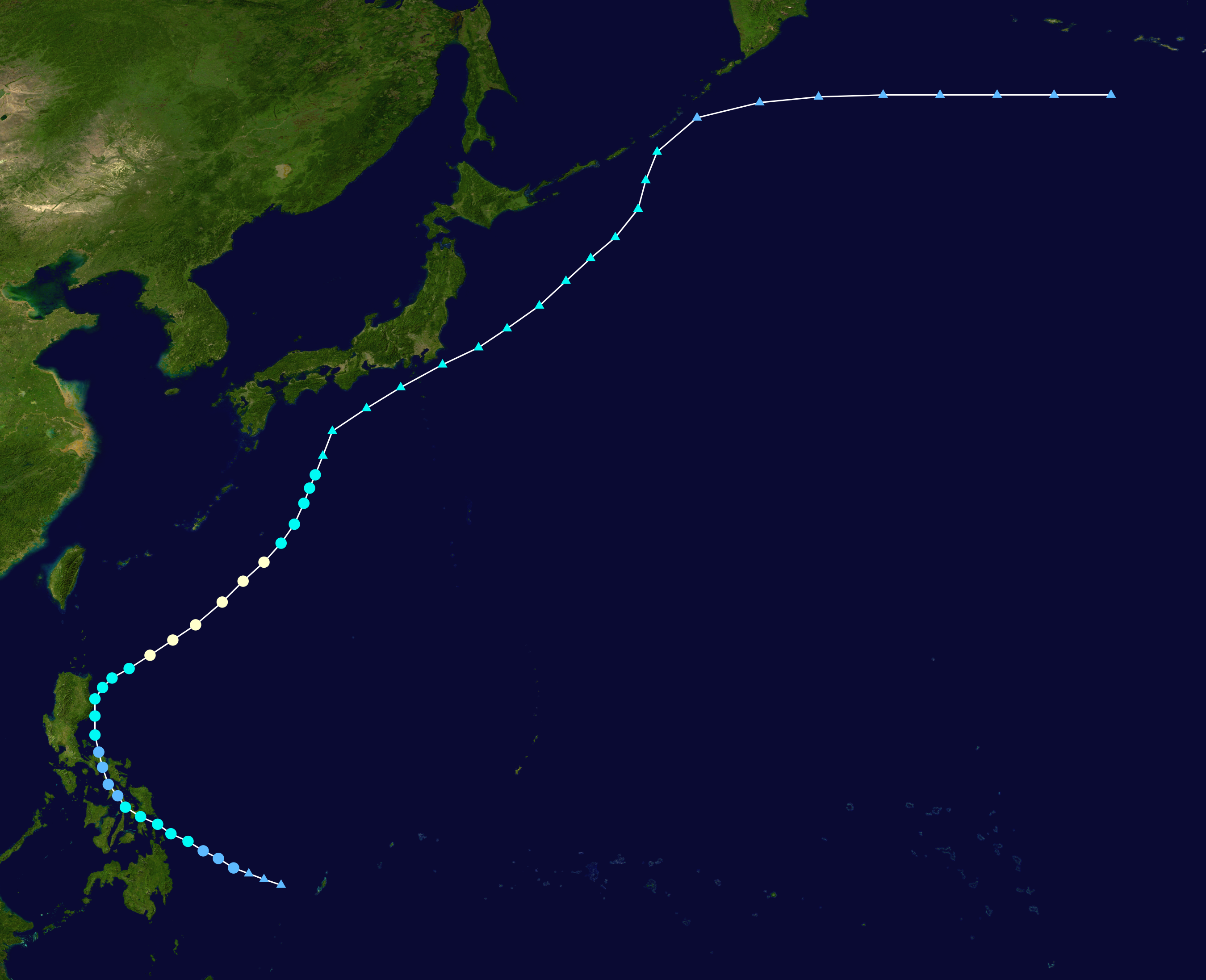
- Duration: May 14 – May 22
- Peak intensity: 150 km/h (90 mph) (1-min); 980 hPa (mbar)

A surge from the easterlies came in contact with a polar trough on May 13, creating an easterly wave which began developing in the afternoon near the island of Koror. The wave progressed northwestward away from the island and continued developing over the next few days. On May 16, the wave was upgraded to a tropical storm, the third of the season off the coast of the Philippines with winds of 45 mph (72 km/h). The storm, named Hope, continued northwestward, peaking first at 60 mph (97 km/h) before striking several islands over the Philippines. While over land, Tropical Storm Hope weakened to a minimal tropical storm on May 17 and into a tropical depression with no circulation later that day. The storm remained a tropical depression over the day, crossing the eastern island of the Philippines. Tropical Depression Hope left the island and began to strengthen back into a minimal tropical storm by May 18. However, the storm interacted with land once more and weakened back into a tropical depression on May 18.

After leaving the Philippines for the final time, the depression began to develop, becoming a tropical storm for the third time since May 16 and developing a small eye. As Tropical Storm Hope turned further northeast, the eye expanded and the storm was soon declared a typhoon by the Joint Typhoon Warning Center late evening on May 19. The next day, Hope continued to strengthen and develop, and while just south of Okinawa on May 20, peaked at 90 mph (140 km/h) sustained winds. (Operationally, Typhoon Hope was declared a 100 mph (160 km/h), Category 2 typhoon, but this was demoted in post-analysis.) An internal pressure of 980 millibars was recorded within a 30 miles (48 km) wide eye. Hope began to encounter cold air near Okinawa, Japan, weakening rapidly from a typhoon to a tropical storm on May 21. Hope's eye fell apart and started to begin transition to its extratropical stage. On the morning of May 22, Hope's sustained winds fell below tropical storm stage and the system became a tropical depression. By the afternoon, Hope was declared extratropical and the Joint Typhoon Warning Center ceased following the system.

The extratropical remnants of Typhoon Hope continued northeastward towards the coast of Japan on May 23. The system turned just offshore and paralleled the eastern coast for several days. After May 24, the system begins to leave the Japanese coast in favor of the open Pacific Ocean but made a dart to the north towards the Kuril Islands on May 26. The remains turned once again to the northeast, paralleling the Kamchatka Peninsula for the next day. The storm turned offshore again on May 27 and disappeared near the Aleutian Islands on May 28.

=== Tropical Depression Twenty-One ===
- Tropical depression (JMA)
- Tropical depression (SSHWS)
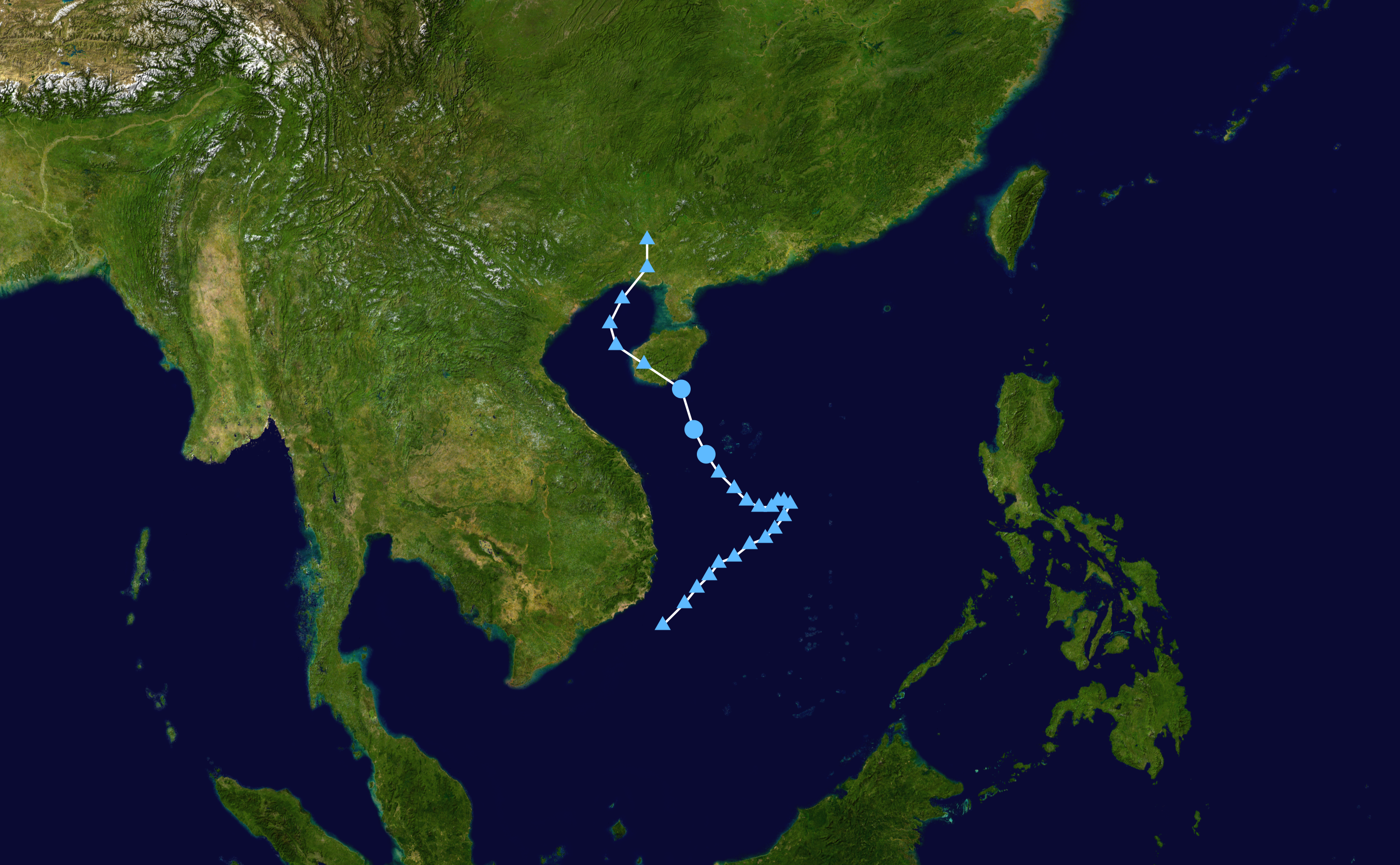
- Duration: May 21 – May 25
- Peak intensity: 55 km/h (35 mph) (1-min); 1002 hPa (mbar)

The 21st tropical wave of the 1962 season formed on May 21 in the open South China Sea, east of the Philippines. The systems strengthened into a tropical depression moved to the southeast toward southwestern South Vietnam. However, the depression returned to its northern progression on May 22 and dissipated on the same day without threatening land.

=== Typhoon Iris ===
- Typhoon (JMA)
- Tropical storm (SSHWS)
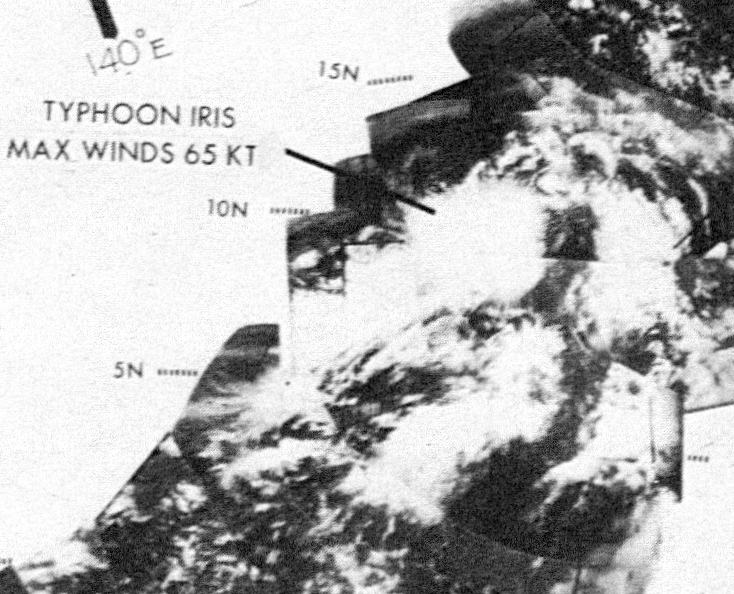
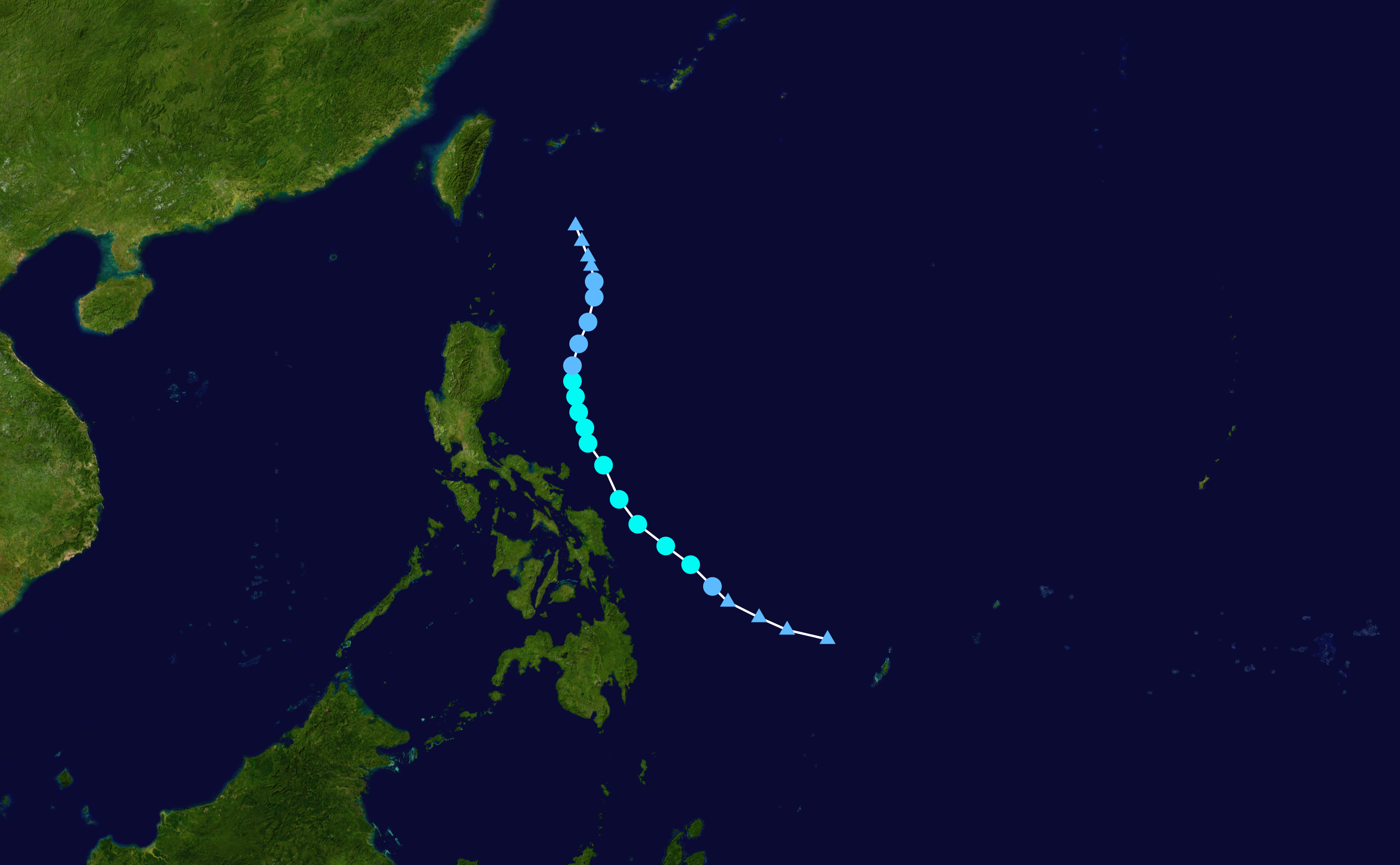
- Duration: May 25 – May 31
- Peak intensity: 110 km/h (70 mph) (1-min); 990 hPa (mbar)

A tropical wave, the 22nd of the 1962 season, forming on May 26 met a polar trough northeast of the island of Koror. This fracture caused the wave to begin developing during the early morning hours. The system rapidly intensified and became the fourth tropical depression of the season on the same afternoon. Within six hours, the depression became Tropical Storm Iris on May 26 just east of the Philippines. The eye of Iris began to define itself, as operationally winds reached 75 mph (121 km/h) on May 27, which would classify the system a typhoon. However, in post-analysis, Iris was never able to strengthen into a typhoon, peaking at winds of 70 mph (110 km/h) off the Philippine coast. A minimum central pressure was read of 990 millibars within the storm. Iris paralleled the shore for several hours, beginning a rapid weakening process, falling to a minimal tropical storm with winds of only 40 mph (64 km/h) by the end of the day.

During the morning of May 28, Iris began to suffer from its lack of upper-level divergence and as a result was demoted into a tropical depression. The weakening system persisted two more days off the coast and dissipated on the morning of May 30. The dissipating remains of the Iris persisted for another day off the Philippines, dissipating southeast of Taiwan on May 31.

Reported impact from Iris in the Philippines were five deaths reported and no estimated damage to crops on the islands.

=== Typhoon Joan ===
- Typhoon (JMA)
- Category 1-equivalent typhoon (SSHWS)
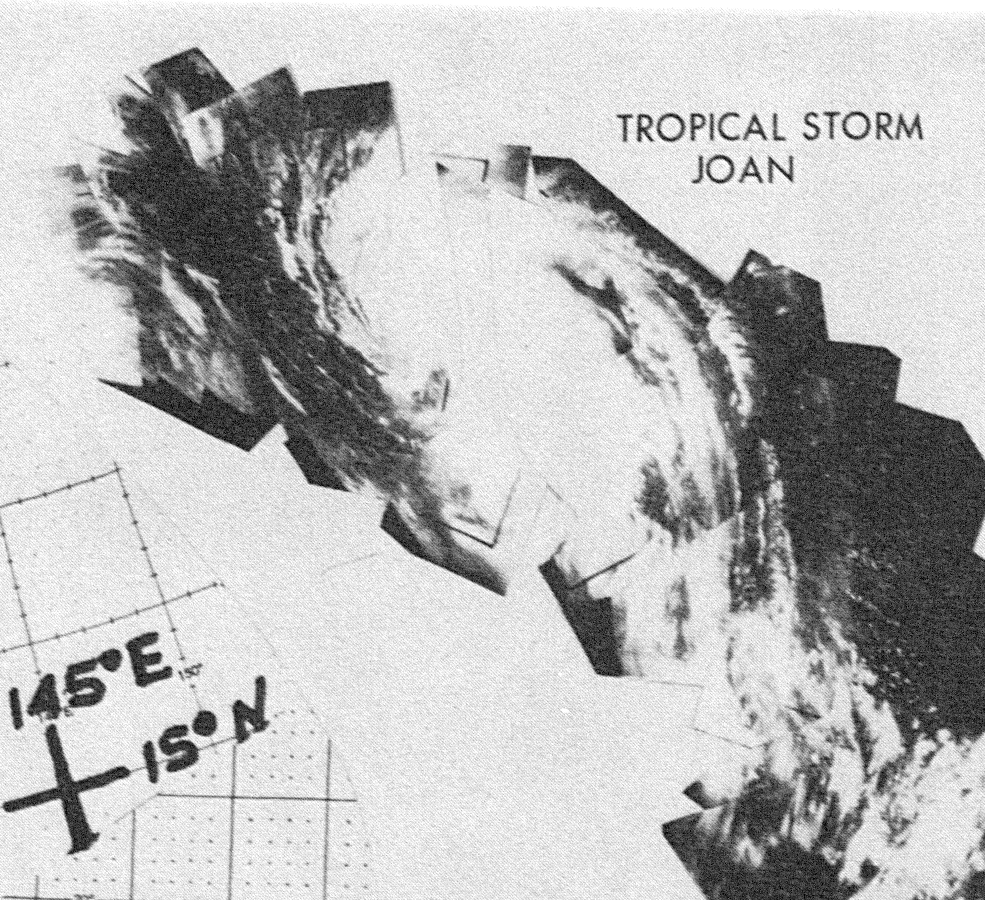
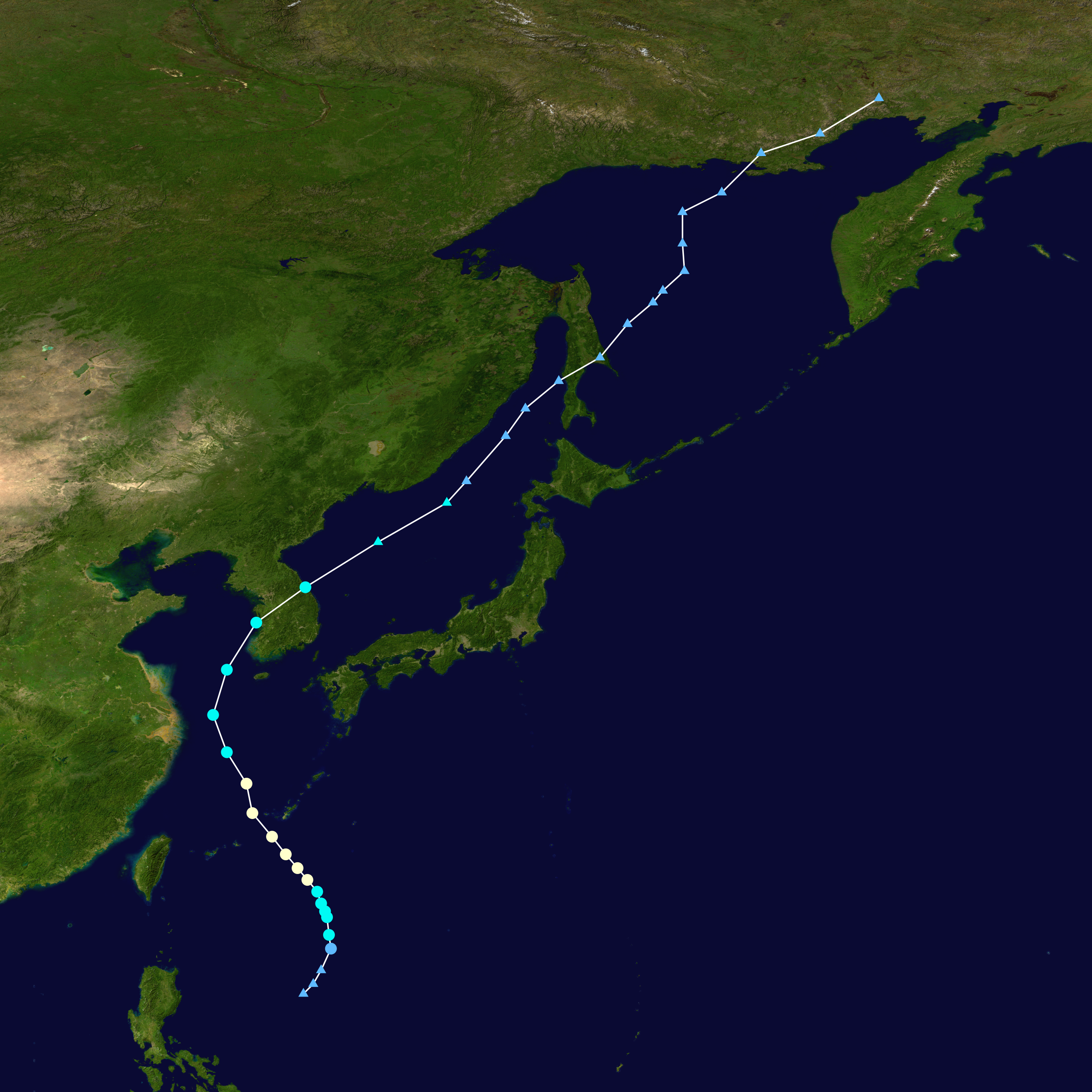
- Duration: July 6 – July 10
- Peak intensity: 150 km/h (90 mph) (1-min); 985 hPa (mbar)

Another easterly wave formed off to the northeast of the Philippines on the afternoon of July 6 after reaching a polar trough. The system quickly organized itself, strengthening into a tropical storm on the morning of July 7. Named Joan, the storm curved to the northwest through the Pacific, rapidly intensfying into a typhoon by the next day. The storm reached a peak sustained windspeed of 90 mph (140 km/h) just to the southeast of the island of Okinawa. The minimum pressure for the storm was registered at 985 millibars (29.1 inHg). After passing Okinawa on July 9, the forward speed in Typhoon Joan increased and the storm began to weaken. The storm boasted an unorganized, elliptical eye as it soon fell to a minimal hurricane that afternoon. On the evening of July 9, the now-Tropical Storm Joan passed due east of Shanghai, China before turning to the northeast on the morning of July 10. With only sustained winds of 50 mph (80 km/h), the system struck the shore of South Korea on the afternoon of July 10. The storm continued weakening as it crossed the 38th parallel and entered North Korea, falling to a minimal tropical storm over land. After emerging from North Korea, the storm raced to the northeast before experiencing cold air and become extratropical on the morning of July 11.

After becoming extratropical, the remains of Joan continued northeastward, curving along the coast of China. The system soon left China and entered the waters of the Soviet Union July 12, soon making landfall on the island of Ostrov Sakhalin. After crossing the island, the system entered the Sea of Okhotsk, where it turned northward towards mainland Siberia. During the day of July 14, the system made landfall near the city of Magadan and crossed the Arctic Circle. Tracking of the system ceased just north of Magadan on the morning of July 15.

Reported damage from Typhoon Joan was minimal in the Koreas, with estimates of only $500,000 (1962 USD ($3.68 million in 2011 USD)). This damage total was estimated from damage to crops in the country and to the communications infrastructure.

=== Tropical Depression Thirty-Nine ===
- Tropical depression (JMA)
- Tropical depression (SSHWS)
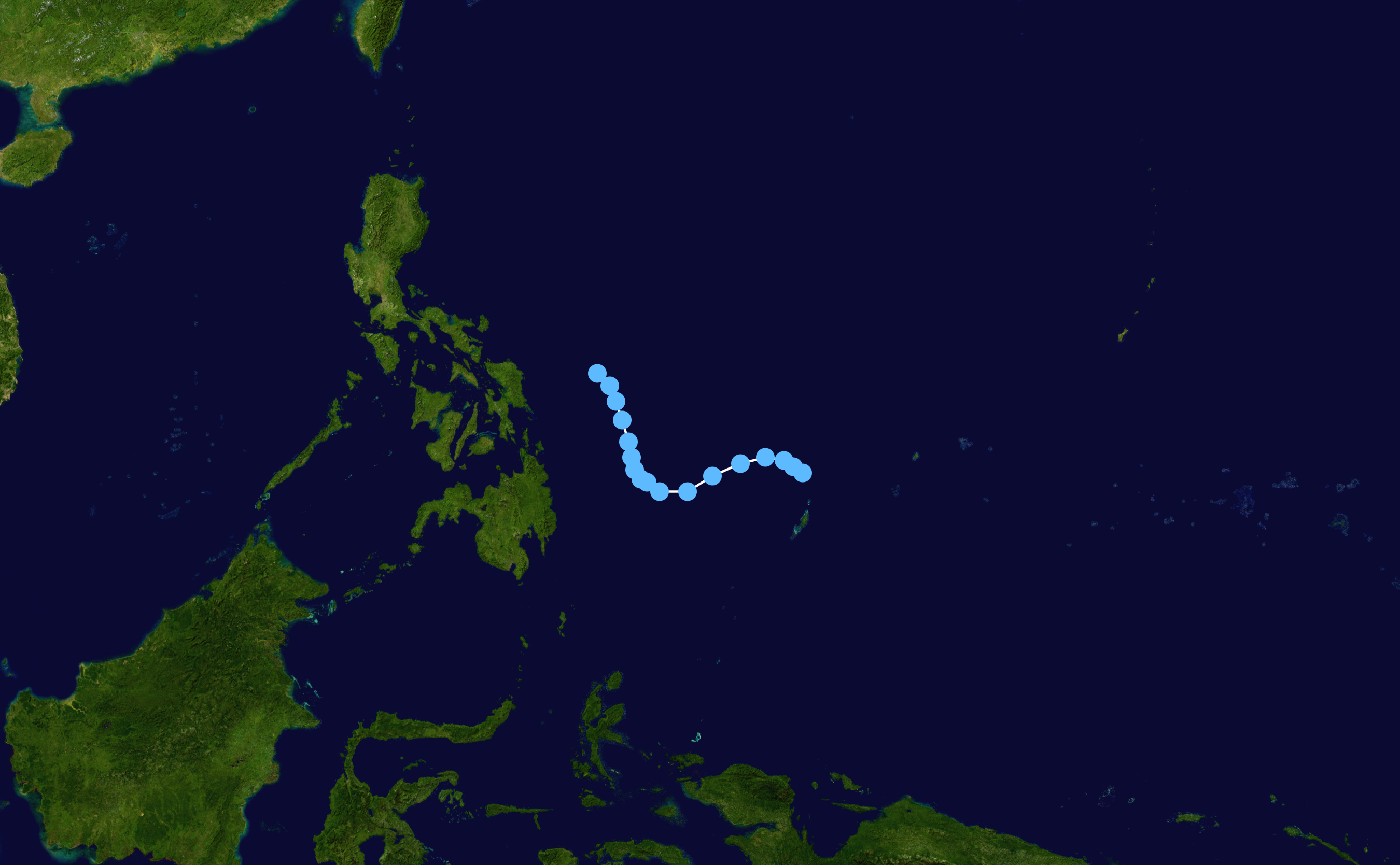
- Duration: July 8 – July 13
- Peak intensity: 55 km/h (35 mph) (1-min); 1004 hPa (mbar)

A tropical system formed on July 7 north of the island of Koror. The system strengthened into a tropical depression the next day when the first advisory was released. The depression continuously changed directions, once on the 8th to the northwest, again the next day to the southwest and the final one on the 10th to the northwest again. The tropical depression continued to the northwest, but degenerated into a remnant low on the morning of July 12. The remnants continued moving away, dissipating on July 15.

The depression never made landfall, so no damage or fatalities were reported.

=== Tropical Depression Forty-One ===
- Tropical depression (JMA)
- Tropical depression (SSHWS)
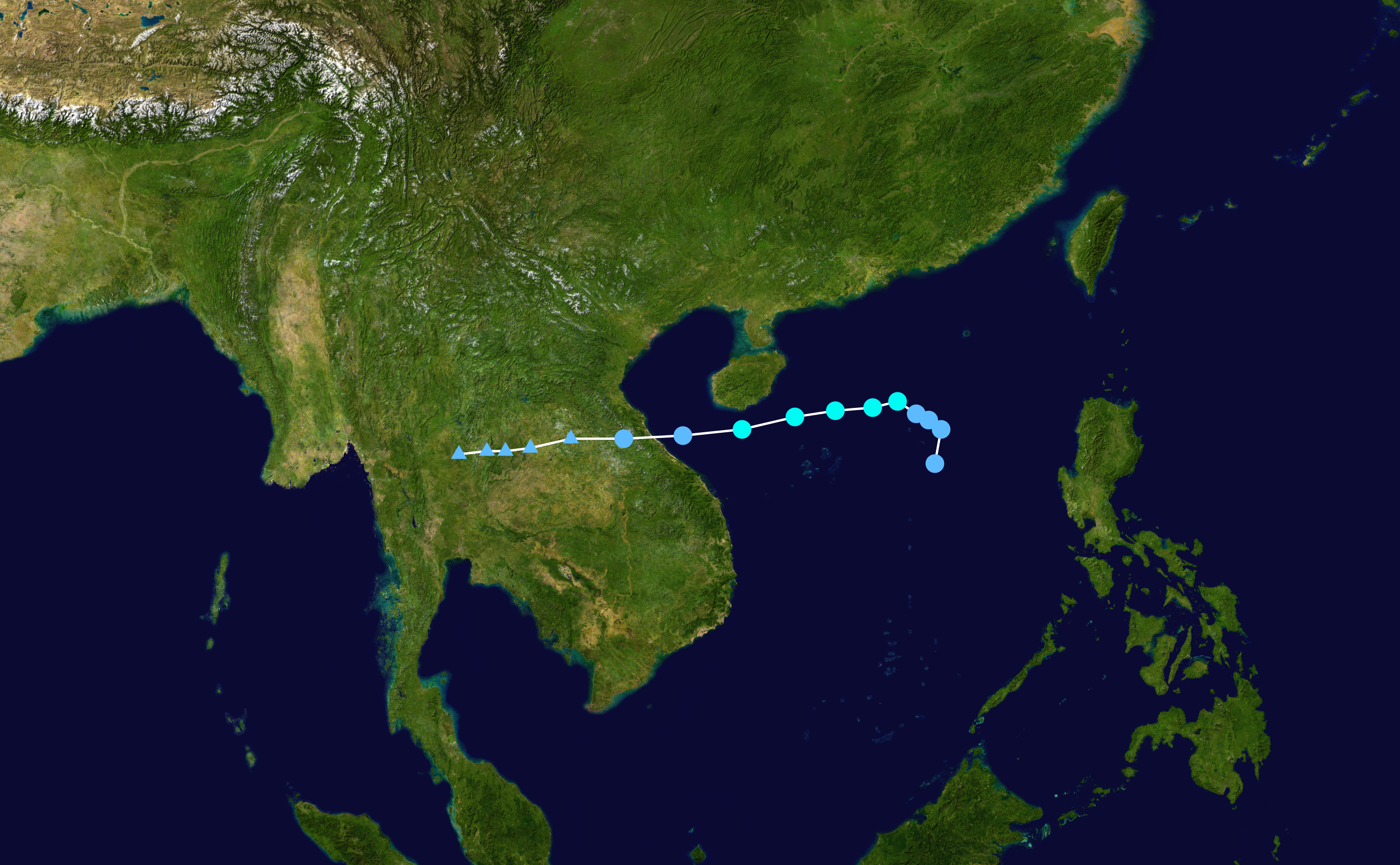
- Duration: July 10 – July 13
- Peak intensity: 55 km/h (35 mph) (1-min); 994 hPa (mbar)

As Typhoon Joan was weakening, a new tropical system formed in the South China Sea on the afternoon of July 10. The system strengthened while moving west, becoming Tropical Depression Forty-One the same day. The depression continued moving west at a rapid pace, passing Hainan Island and made landfall in southern North Vietnam on July 11. The depression dissipated over land late that evening.

Damage and fatalities in Vietnam from the depression are unavailable.

=== Typhoon Kate ===
- Typhoon (JMA)
- Category 1-equivalent typhoon (SSHWS)
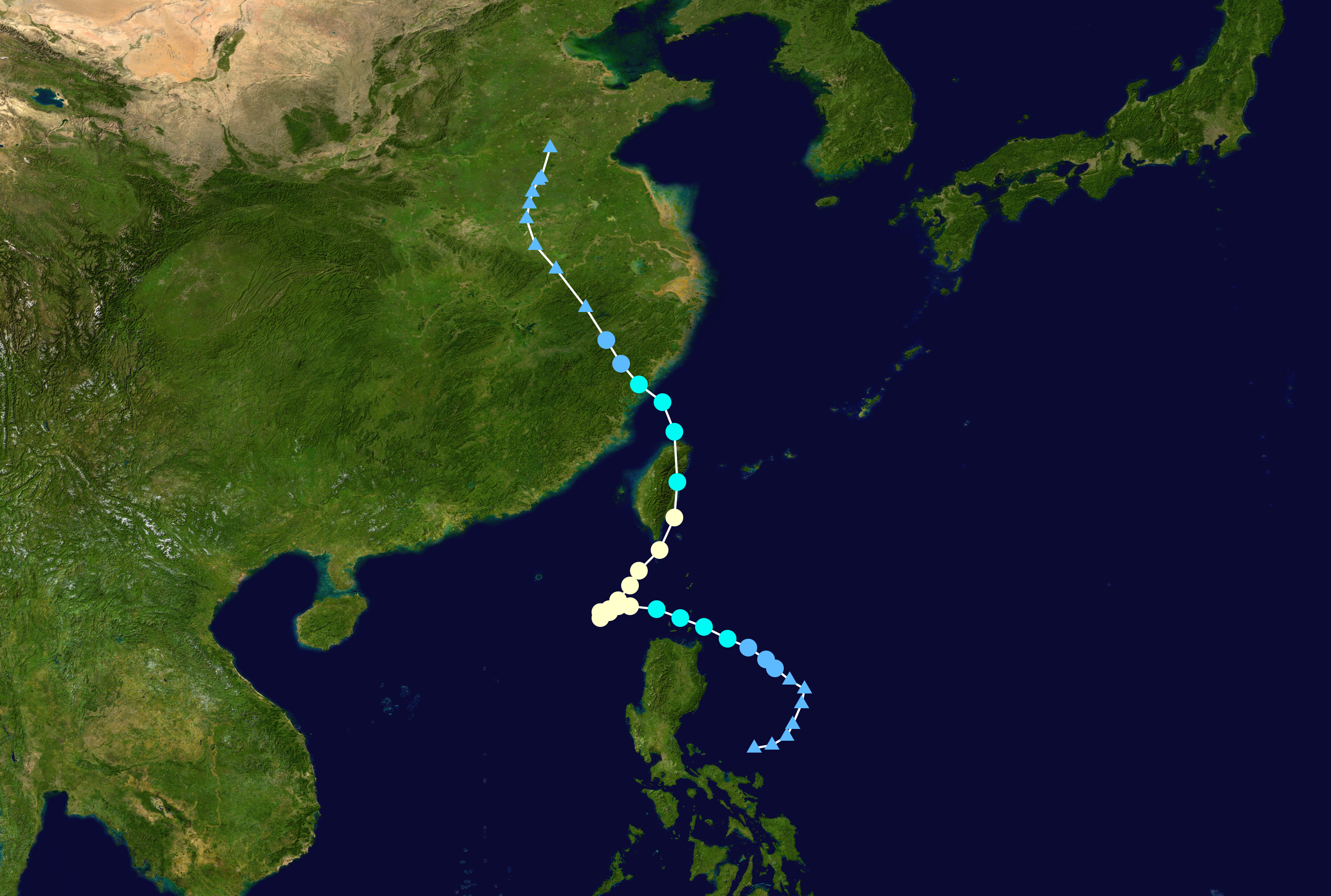
- Duration: July 17 – July 25
- Peak intensity: 150 km/h (90 mph) (1-min); 970 hPa (mbar)

Another surge from the easterlies, combined with the forty-fourth tropical wave of the season, began to develop off the east coast of Luzon in the Philippines on the morning of July 18. At the time, the tropical wave had winds of 15 mph (24 km/h) on its surface. The wave rapidly intensified during the morning and the Joint Typhoon Warning Center upped the system to a tropical depression the same afternoon. The next morning the system was upgraded to a tropical storm and received the name Kate. The new storm had a small, open eyewall which expanded during the day as the storm slowly intensified through and by the late morning of July 20, the storm became a typhoon with winds of 75 mph (121 km/h). That morning, the eye had only a 12-mile (19 km) diameter and had similar surface winds. During the afternoon, the storm made a curve to the southwest from its track and looped back northward. By the morning of July 21, the storm began a northeastern turn towards Taiwan.

The typhoon continued to intensify, maintaining typhoon status during the day and reaching a peak sustained winds of 90 mph (140 km/h) on the morning of July 22. Central pressures were recorded at a minimum of 970 millibars at peak as well. (Operationally, the Joint Typhoon Warning Center had Kate peaking at sustained winds of 100 mph (160 km/h), making it a Category 2 cyclone on the Saffir-Simpson Hurricane Scale, however this was demoted in post-analysis.) As Kate approached Taiwan, the storm weakened, making landfall on the afternoon of July 22 near Taitung City with sustained winds of 80 mph (130 km/h). The storm crossed the island over the afternoon, weakening into a tropical storm by the afternoon. After emerging from Taiwan, Tropical Storm Kate turned to the northwest and made landfall once again near Wenzhou on July 23 with sustained winds of 60 mph (97 km/h). The interaction with land cause quick dissipation of the storm over mainland China, and the warning center ceased following the storm on the morning of July 24. The remains of Kate continued on for a short distance, crossing through China over the next day and into Mongolia before dissipating on July 25.

The damage left behind from Typhoon Kate were extensive as the storm killed 110 residents and caused $25 million (1962 USD ($184 million in 2011 USD)) in damages to crops, homes and infrastructure.

=== Typhoon Louise ===
- Typhoon (JMA)
- Category 1-equivalent typhoon (SSHWS)
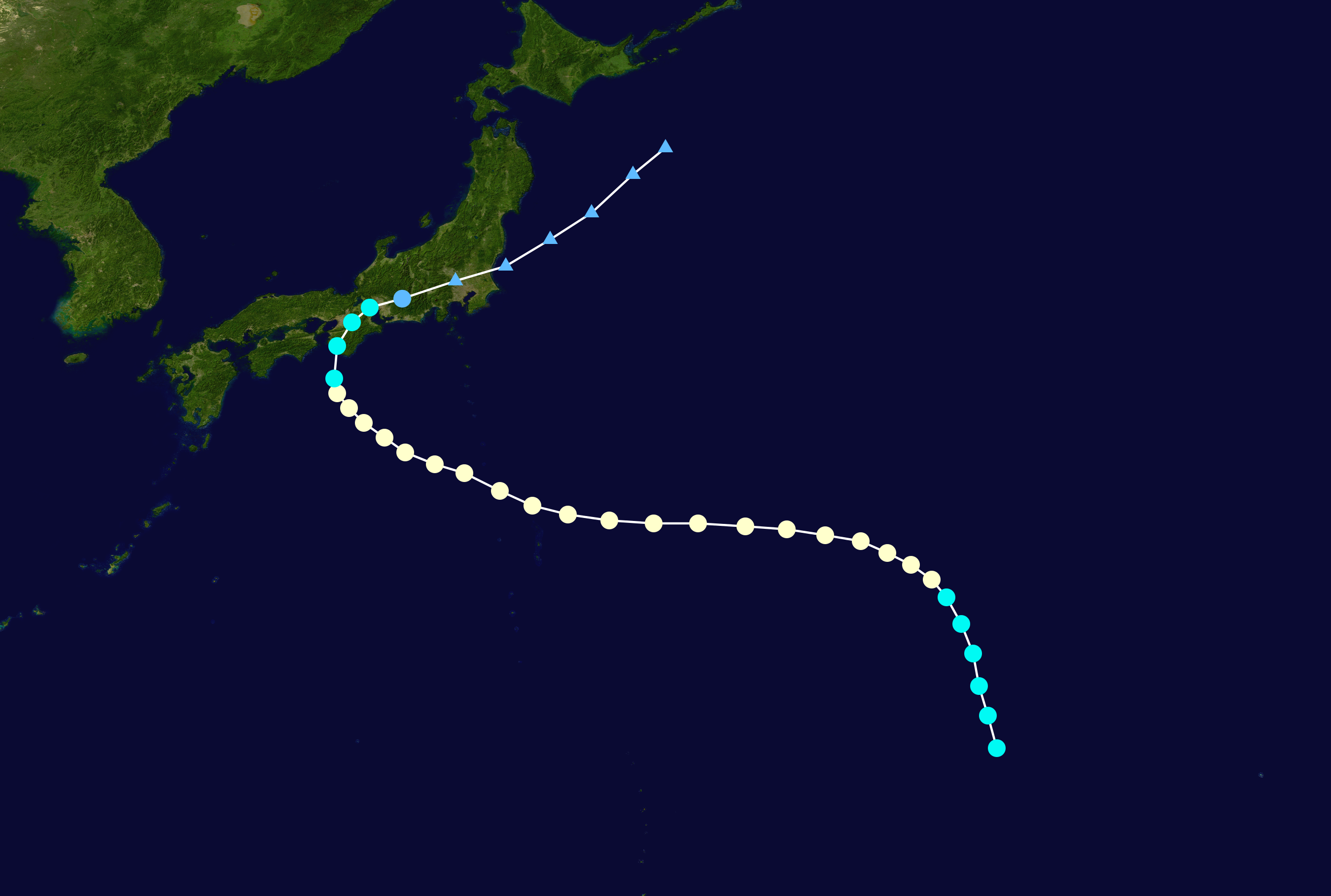
- Duration: July 20 – July 28
- Peak intensity: 150 km/h (90 mph) (1-min); 960 hPa (mbar)

A tropical system formed far to the northeast of Saipan in the early morning hours of July 19. The storm quickly strengthened northward through the open Pacific waters, and on the afternoon of July 20, was classified as a 50 mph (80 km/h) tropical storm named Louise. Louise continued moving to the north at about 10–11 mph. By the late evening on July 21, Louise had grown into a Category 1 typhoon, boasting winds of 75 mph (121 km/h) and a 200 square mile oval-shaped eye. At that point, Louise turned westward towards the southern end of Japan. Operationally, Louise strengthened to winds of 90 mph (140 km/h), however, in best track, the storm had weakened to a tropical storm early on the 23rd. However, this remained its peak intensity. It restrengthened into a typhoon by the morning of July 24, crossing to the north of Chichi Jima and Iwo Jima before making landfall near Mount Zenjinomori on the morning of July 26 as a 70 mph (110 hm/h) tropical storm.

The storm began weakening over land, and the Joint Typhoon Warning Center ceased releasing advisories and aircraft on Louise, which had degenerated into a tropical depression near Osaka, Japan. The dissipating system continued to the northeast, crossing over Tokyo and re-entering the open Pacific Ocean waters on July 28. The system continued northeast towards the Kuril Islands before dissipating during the day on July 29.

Louise killed fifteen people and doing $7.5 million (1962 USD) ($56.1 million (2011 USD)) in damage to crops, homes and bridges in Japan.

=== Tropical Storm Marge ===
- Tropical storm (JMA)
- Tropical storm (SSHWS)
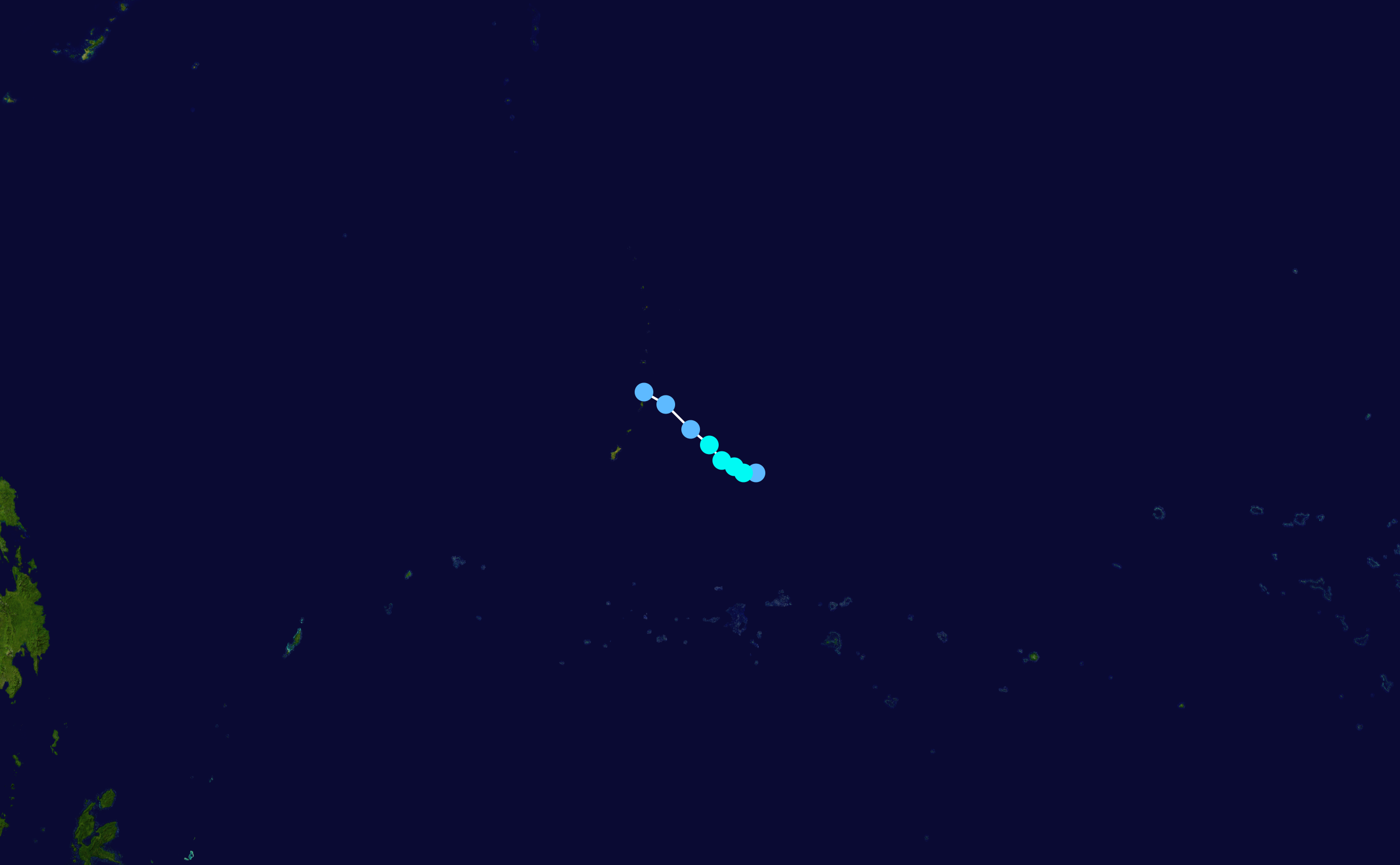
- Duration: July 28 – July 29
- Peak intensity: 75 km/h (45 mph) (1-min); 1002 hPa (mbar)

A tropical wave formed in the open Pacific Ocean waters on July 25 and strengthened into Tropical Depression Forty-Seven on July 28 in an area of ocean north of Truk. The depression strengthened into a tropical storm and was given the name Marge. Marge peaked at a 45 mph (72 km/h), 1002 mbar weak tropical storm on July 28. Marge dissipated on the morning of July 29 near Guam and Saipan.

No damage or fatalities were reported, as Marge never made landfall.

=== Typhoon Nora ===
- Typhoon (JMA)
- Category 1-equivalent typhoon (SSHWS)
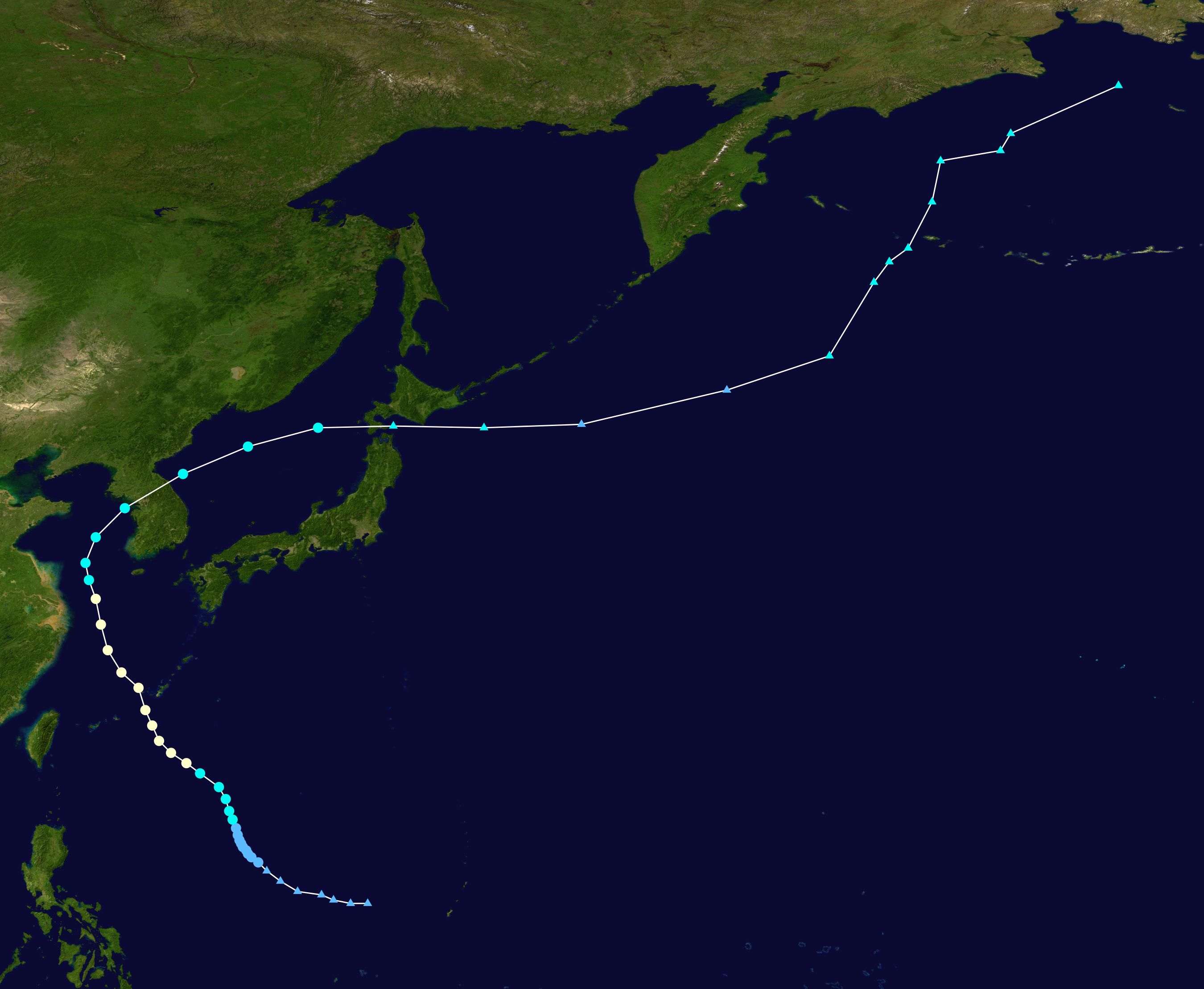
- Duration: July 28 – August 3
- Peak intensity: 140 km/h (85 mph) (1-min); 968 hPa (mbar)

The system that would become Typhoon Nora developed on the morning of July 26 in the open waters of the Pacific Ocean east of Manila as a tropical wave from the westerlies. That morning, the Joint Typhoon Warning Center began issuing advisories on a tropical depression (designated Tropical Depression 46) with 25 mph (40 km/h) winds. After remaining practically stationary for three straight days off the coast of the Philippines, the depression strengthened into Tropical Storm Nora on the morning of July 29. The storm progressed to the northwest through the open waters, rapidly strengthening, and by the end of the day on July 29, Nora had strengthened to a 55 mph (89 km/h). Operationally, Nora became a typhoon with winds of 75 mph (121 km/h), however, the best track for Nora has been updated for the change to have occurred six hours later in the waters east of Taiwan.

Continuing northwest past Taiwan, Nora continued strengthening, peaking at max winds of 85 mph (137 km/h) on the morning of July 31. While at peak strength, Nora crossed west of the island of Okinawa, Japan. During the afternoon of August 1, Nora weakened in strength as it proceeded east of Shanghai, China. By the morning of August 2, Nora had weakened into a tropical storm, making an eastern turn towards the Koreas. On the afternoon of August 2, Nora made landfall near Incheon, South Korea with winds of 40 mph (64 km/h). Nora sped up while crossing over South Korea and into North Korea, crossing into the open waters, soon making landfall once again on the Japanese island of Hokkaido. Just east of Hokkaido, ran over cold air in the open Pacific waters, becoming extratropical on August 4.

The remnants of Nora proceeded northeast and north past the Kamchatka Peninsula, crossing into the Bering Sea near Semisopochnoi Island on August 5. The remnants made a northwestern turn towards Russia before turning north through the Sea. The system was last tracked south of the Bering Strait and just north of the Arctic Circle on August 6.

Across the northernmost Japanese island of Hokkaido, heavy rains from the storm triggered widespread flooding that killed 15 people and left 14 others missing. $1 million (1962 USD) was recorded to homes, crops, railroads and highways along the areas affected by Nora.

=== Typhoon Opal ===
- Typhoon (JMA)
- Category 5-equivalent super typhoon (SSHWS)
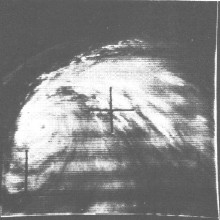
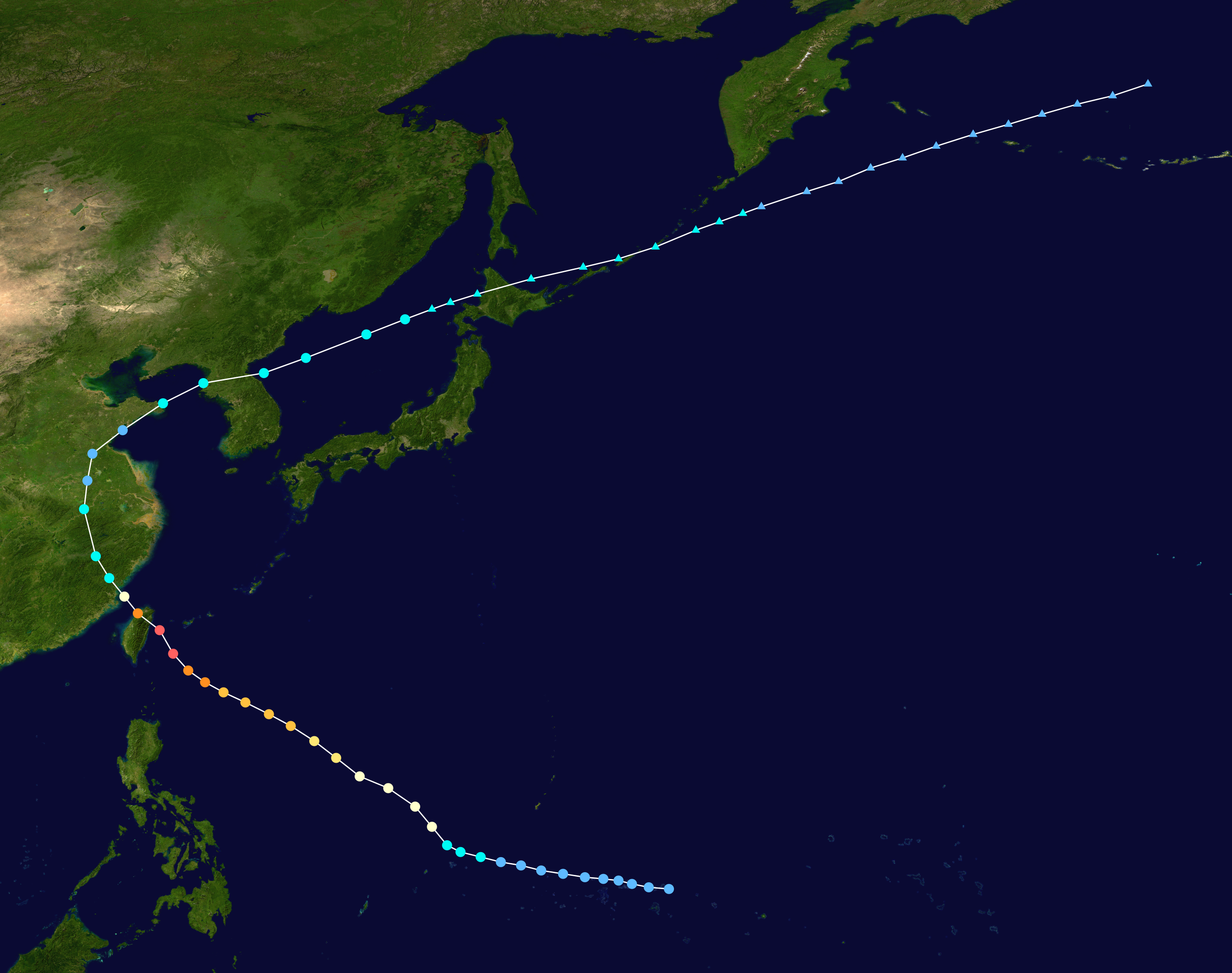
- Duration: July 30 – August 9
- Peak intensity: 270 km/h (165 mph) (1-min); 900 hPa (mbar)

An easterly wave met with a polar trough just northwest of the island of Ponape. on the afternoon of July 28. The Joint Typhoon Warning Center began following the wave for the next day, as it headed westward, north of Truk. Slowly curving northeast from the island, the wave soon was upgraded to a tropical depression with winds of 30 mph (48 km/h) with no eye structure on July 30. The depression strengthened on the morning of July 31 to 35 mph (56 km/h) winds and persisted throughout the day at that strength. The depression continued its northwestern curve, speeding up and weakening once again to 30 mph (48 km/h) on the morning of August 1. After passing Woleai, the depression strengthened once again and became Tropical Storm Opal the same afternoon. The storm continued intensifying during the afternoon, with winds reaching 50 mph (80 km/h) by nightfall. By the next morning, Opal was upgraded into a typhoon, the eighth of the 1962 season. The typhoon, now northwest of the island of Ulithi, continued turning to the northwest, beginning to slow as the system continued strengthening. By nightfall, the system had an eye forming, wide as 5 miles (8.0 km). By nightfall, the system was up to winds of 90 mph (140 km/h) and passing far east of the Philippines. Opal continued the northwest progression, strengthening throughout the day of August 3 and forming a wider eye. By the end of the day, the storm was now a Category 3 typhoon with winds of 115 mph (185 km/h). Strengthening continued overnight as the typhoon passed to the east of Luzon, strengthening close to super typhoon status by nightfall on August 4 with a shrinking eye. The next morning, Typhoon Opal strengthened into the second super typhoon of the season, boasting sustained winds of 160 mph (260 km/h). During the day on August 5, Opal continued strengthening, peaking with winds of 165 mph (266 km/h) just east of Taiwan. (Operationally, Opal was classified as a 170 mph (270 km/h) typhoon, but this was downgraded to a 165 mph (266 km/h) in post-analysis.) Minimum recorded central pressures for Opal were registered at 900 millibars. Soon after peaking, the storm struck the island of Taiwan with winds of 165 mph (266 km/h). The storm weakened over land to 135 mph (217 km/h) after crossing the island and continued weakening into a 90 mph (140 km/h) typhoon as it made landfall in mainland China. The typhoon continued to weaken over land, weakening into a tropical storm on the morning of August 6. Opal persisted as a tropical storm on August 6, weakening into a tropical depression the next morning. During the afternoon of August 7, with influences from land, the storm became extratropical. The extratropical remains of Opal crossed eastern mainland China, entering the East China Sea in the late evening. Early in the morning of August 8, the storm struck North Korea near the capital city of Pyongyang. After crossing the country, the system reappeared in the sea before crossing. On the morning of August 9, the system made landfall on the Hokkaido region of Japan, near the town of Rumoi. After crossing the island, the storm entered the Sea of Okhotsk on August 10. During the afternoon, the system crossed the Kuril Islands and began a parallel with the Kamchatka Peninsula the next day. On the morning of August 13, the system entered the Aleutian Islands, passing west of Semisopochnoi Island and the Rat Islands before entering the Bering Sea. The extratropical remains disappeared on August 14 in the middle of the sea, just south of the Arctic Circle.

The impact of Typhoon Opal was most devastating in Taiwan, where originally 87 deaths were reported on the island, with 20 people missing and over 1400 injured. Some 5,000 people were homeless in Yilan City. Nearly 1,500 homes were destroyed as a result of Opal, along with 4,700 others damaged due to the high winds. Huge waves kicked up by Opel also sent a storm surge into the city, sweeping away homes. However, by August 8, this number was demoted to only 12 deaths on the island, 966 injured and five people missing. The 170 mph (270 km/h) strong winds took a freighter off its anchors and swamping it, along with a number of fishing boats. Although winds of 110 mph (180 km/h) were felt in Taipei, no fatalities were reported because of ample warning, causing residents to evacuate. In Taipei, Opal caused streets to flood, uprooted trees and tore down telephone lines. 38 injuries were also reported, with 35 houses destroyed. 180 were also damaged in Taipei. Elsewhere, Opal caused two deaths in the islands of Japan, centered on the island of Southern Hokkaido. Nine people there were also injured and one person was reported missing. After Typhoon Opal passed through South Korea, seven fishermen were killed along the coast of the Yellow Sea. 72 more people were missing. Five ships were also sunk in the Yellow Sea, twelve more were reported missing. The estimated damage total came out to about $25 million. (1962 USD; $184 million (2011 USD)) These totals came in the form of crop, transportation, and structural damage.

=== Typhoon Patsy ===
- Typhoon (JMA)
- Category 1-equivalent typhoon (SSHWS)
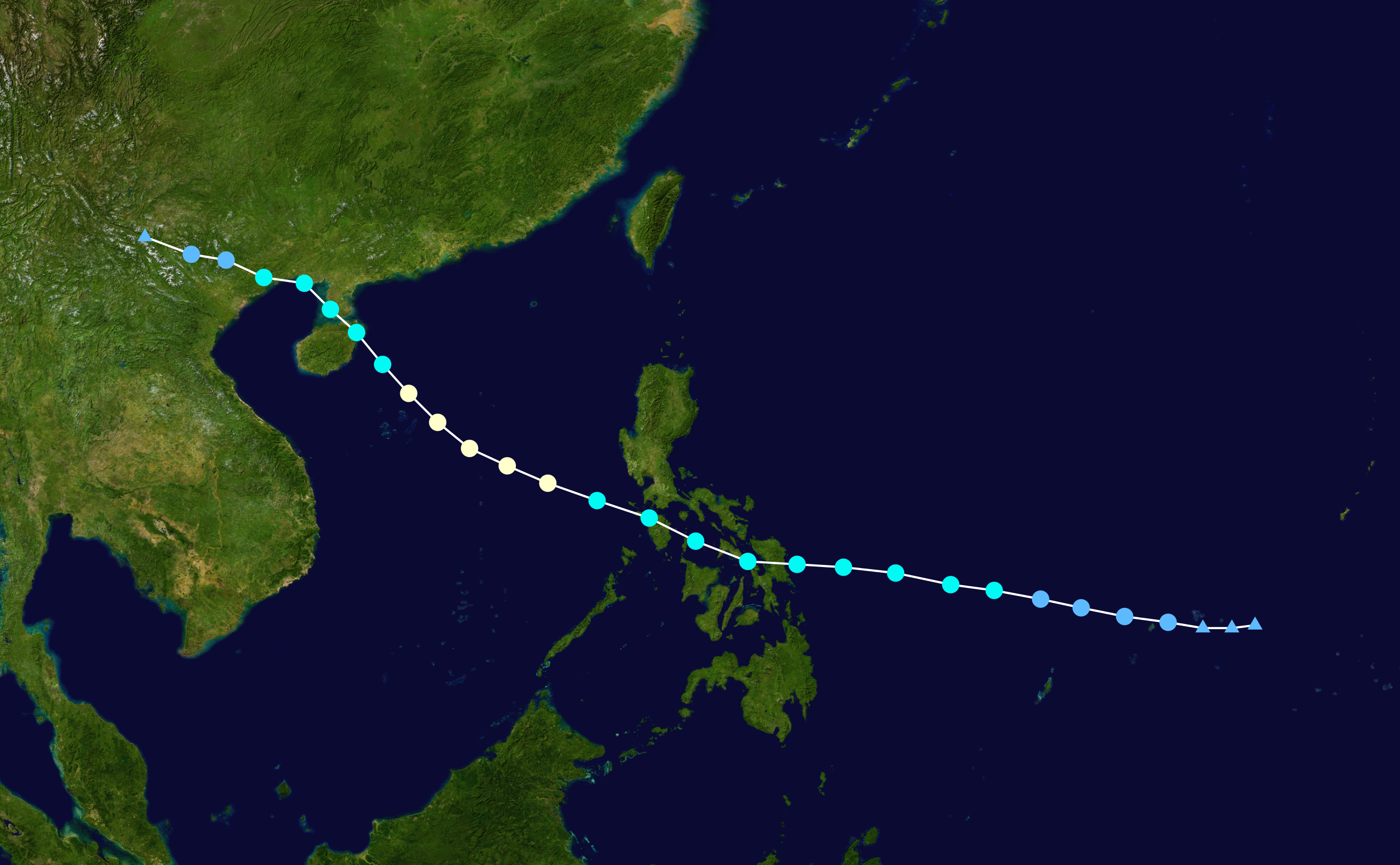
- Duration: August 5 – August 12
- Peak intensity: 120 km/h (75 mph) (1-min); 988 hPa (mbar)

A surge from the westerlies entered the easterlies on the afternoon of August 5, east of the island of Yap. The forming system proceeded west, crossing over the island directly later that evening. Continuing to gain strength, the system became a tropical depression west of Yap on the morning of August 6 (designed Tropical Depression 51). The depression continued west through the open waters of the Pacific Ocean, reaching tropical storm strength on the afternoon of August 6, northwest of Koror. Now a tropical storm named Patsy, the cyclone continued east towards the Philippines, gaining strength in the open waters. The storm reached winds of 70 mph (110 km/h) before making landfall near Borongan on the evening of August 7. Patsy criss-crossed the islands of the Philippines, entering the South China Sea west of Manila the next morning.

After crossing back into the open waters of the South China Sea, Patsy strengthened into a typhoon as it proceeded northwest, reaching a peak wind speed of 75 mph (121 km/h) with a minimum pressure of 990 mbar on the morning of August 9. Patsy retained typhoon status throughout the day, making landfall on Hainan near the city of Wenchang as a tropical storm with winds of 70 mph (110 km/h). Weakening as it crossed over China, the storm crossed along the southwestern shores of a nearby peninsula. Crossing through a gulf of the South China Sea, Patsy weakened to a 50 mph (80 km/h) tropical storm before the Joint Typhoon Warning Center ceased following the system on the morning of August 11, as it made landfall near the city of Dianbai Liaogang, China. The dissipating remnants of Patsy continued east through the gulf during the day of August 11, crossing back into mainland China and died over land on August 12.

Patsy's heavy rain and flooding caused 29 casualties with more than 200 missing. Damage totaled out to $2.5 million (1962 USD) ($18.7 million (2011 USD)), including major infrastructural damage at the University of Santo Tomas and the shutting down of the Manila airport. The backlash from Patsy destroyed over 6,400 acres (26 km^{2}) of rice, and damaged roads through Thailand. Patsy made landfall four times, three as a tropical system.

=== Typhoon Ruth ===
- Typhoon (JMA)
- Category 5-equivalent super typhoon (SSHWS)
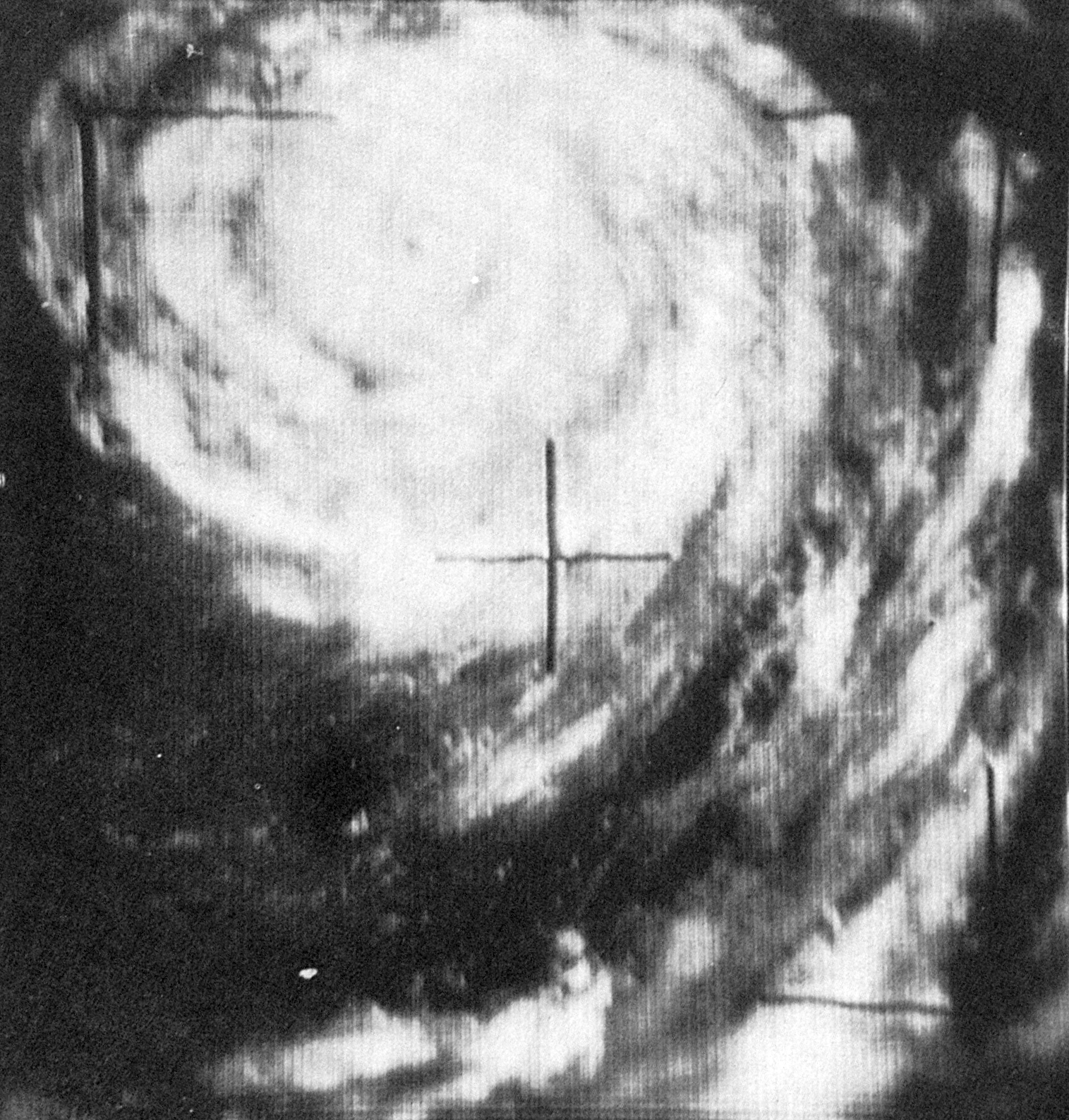
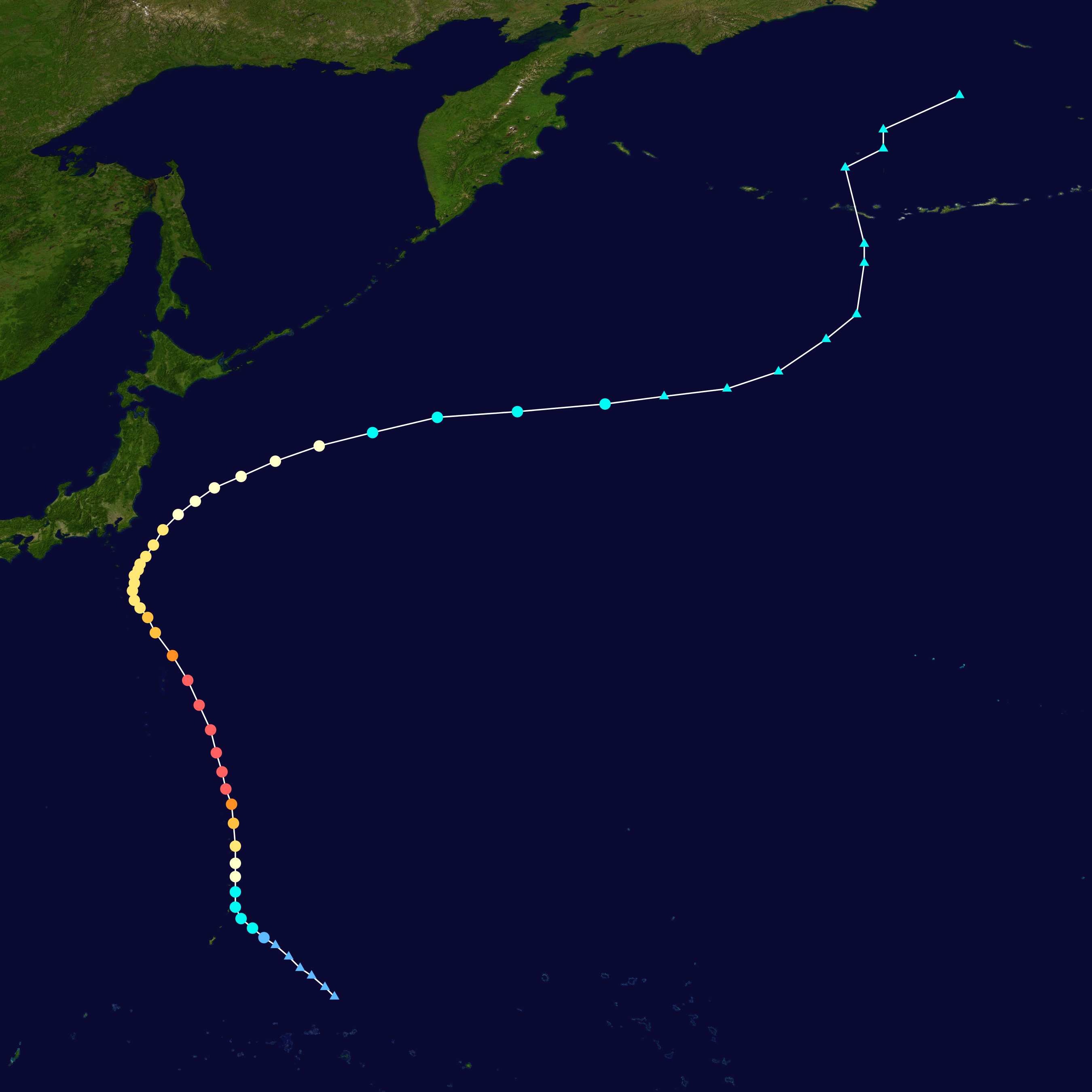
- Duration: August 12 – August 23
- Peak intensity: 295 km/h (185 mph) (1-min); 915 hPa (mbar)

A surge from the westerlies and a cut-off low formed a new low-pressure system in the waters of the Pacific Ocean just north of Truk on August 11. The system proceeded northwest for two-days, passing northeast of Guam, where it strengthened on August 13 into a tropical storm with winds of 60 mph (97 km/h). The storm rapidly intensified as it bent northward, gaining typhoon strength in less than twelve hours, and making a direct hit with the island of Saipan on the morning of August 14. Continuing to gain strength, Typhoon Ruth crossed northward past Saipan, becoming a Category 5 typhoon with winds of 160 mph (260 km/h) on the afternoon of August 15. The typhoon soon turned towards the northwest and past near Iwo Jima as a 185 mph (298 km/h) typhoon on the evening of August 16.

Boasting a minimum pressure of 915 millibars, Typhoon Ruth held its peak strength of 185 mph (298 km/h) for twelve hours before weakening off the coast of Chichi Jima as a 160 mph (260 km/h), minimal Category 5 typhoon. Continuing northwest, the storm approached the coasts of Japan, slowly weakening over the next several days. On the morning of August 18, Typhoon Ruth made a turn to the northeast and crossed to the east of Tokyo. Proceeding away from the coast of Japan, Ruth continued to weaken, becoming a Category 1 typhoon on the afternoon of August 20, bending northeast into the open waters of the Pacific Ocean. Ruth was one of three active systems on August 21 at the same time with Typhoon Thelma and Typhoon Sarah. After crossing the 155th meridian on August 22, Ruth weakened into a tropical storm as it experienced the effects of cold air. On the evening of August 22, the storm was deemed extratropical.

The extratropical remains of Tropical Storm Ruth continued east through the open waters of the Pacific Ocean, bending northeast just east of the International Date Line. Now proceeding north, the system crossed Semisopochnoi Island and entered the Bering Sea. The storm turned northeast again, crossed the Date Line before merging into a system in the sea, just south of the Arctic Circle.

=== Typhoon Sarah ===
- Typhoon (JMA)
- Category 1-equivalent typhoon (SSHWS)
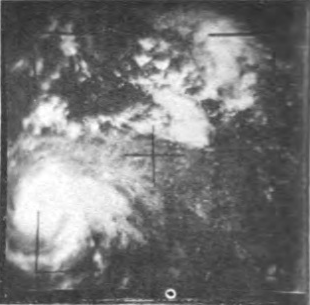
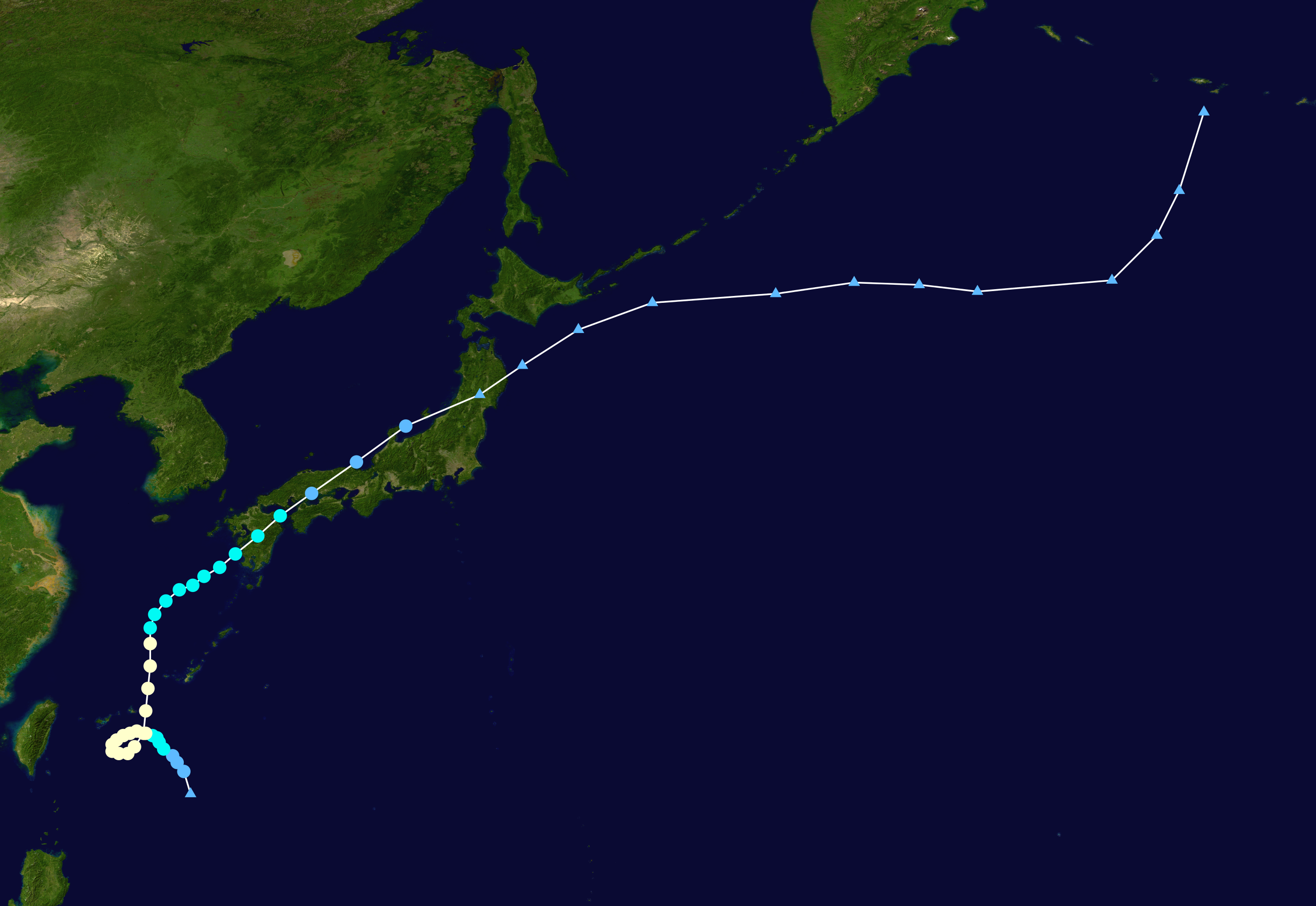
- Duration: August 14 – August 22
- Peak intensity: 140 km/h (85 mph) (1-min); 975 hPa (mbar)

The tropical wave that would develop into Typhoon Sarah formed southeast of the coast of Iwo Jima on the evening of August 8. The wave proceeded southwest across the open waters of the Pacific Ocean for several days, slowly gaining strength on August 14–15 south of Okinawa, Japan. On the morning of August 15, the Joint Typhoon Warning Center began following the storm, which had winds of 70 mph (110 km/h). Slowly gaining strength, the storm, now named Sarah, became a typhoon on that afternoon. Sarah soon started making a loop on August 16 and August 17, peaking at winds of 85 mph (140 mp/h) and an internal pressure of 978 millibars. Soon crossing its former track on the afternoon of August 18, Sarah continued northward as a typhoon, striking islands to the east of Taiwan and west of Okinawa.

Experiencing cold air in the East China Sea, Sarah weakened slowly, weakening into a tropical storm on the afternoon of August 19. Bending northeast that day, the storm made landfall in the mainland of Japan near the city of Hioki on August 21 with wind speeds of 60 mph (97 km/h). The system gradually weakened as it crossed over Japan, experiencing the effects of cold air and land. On August 22, Sarah rapidly weakened into a tropical depression before re-entering the East China Sea near the city of Kami. Running along the northern coast of Japan, the Joint Typhoon Warning Center stopped tracking the depression near the Noto Peninsula, as it became extratropical on the afternoon of August 22. The extratropical remnants of Sarah crossed the Noto Peninsula and over mainland Japan once again, proceeding northeast through the Pacific Ocean on August 23. The remains turned northward towards the Aleutian Islands, before dying south of the islands on August 25, just north of the 50th degree latitude

=== Typhoon Thelma ===
- Typhoon (JMA)
- Category 4-equivalent typhoon (SSHWS)
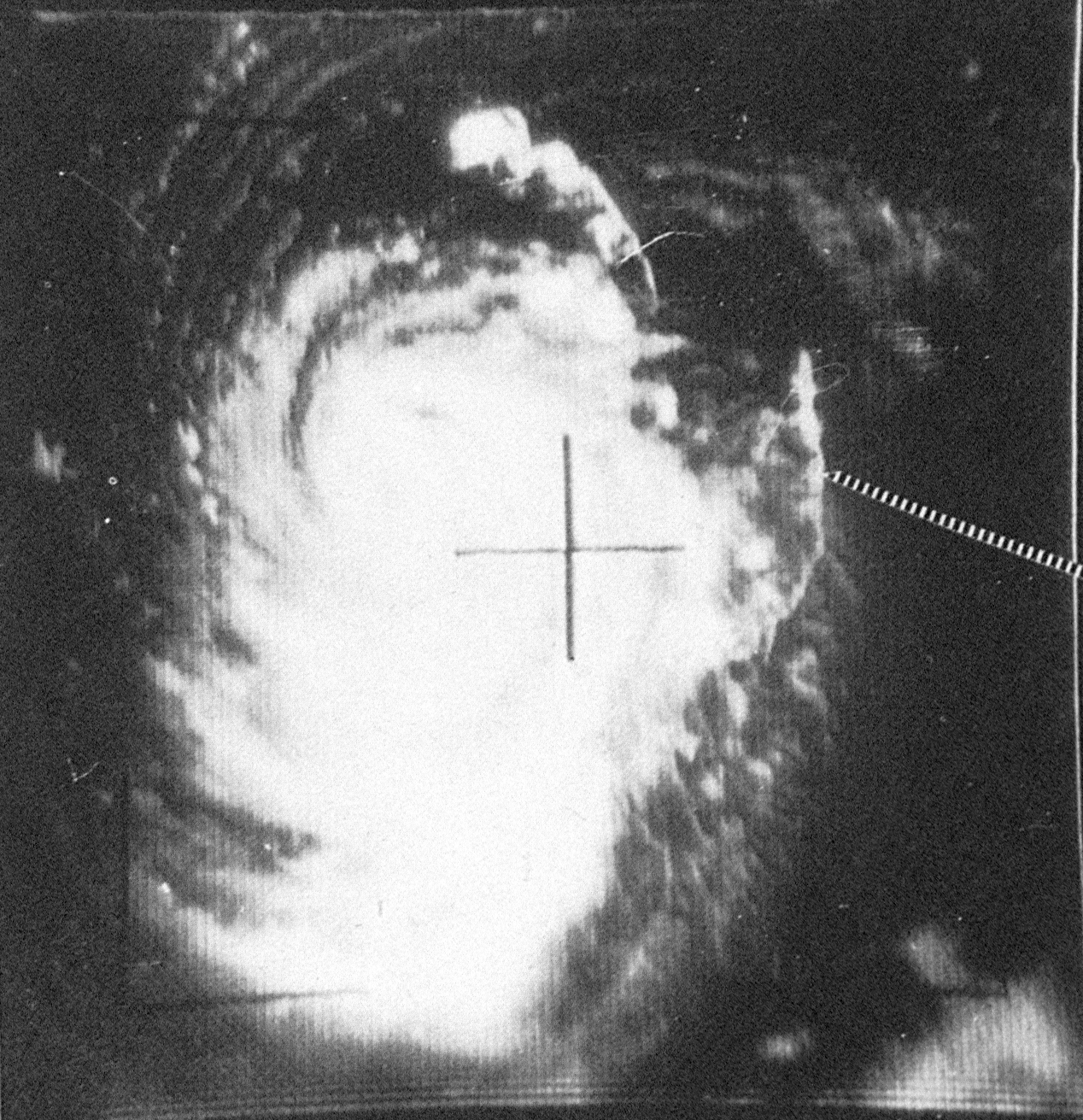
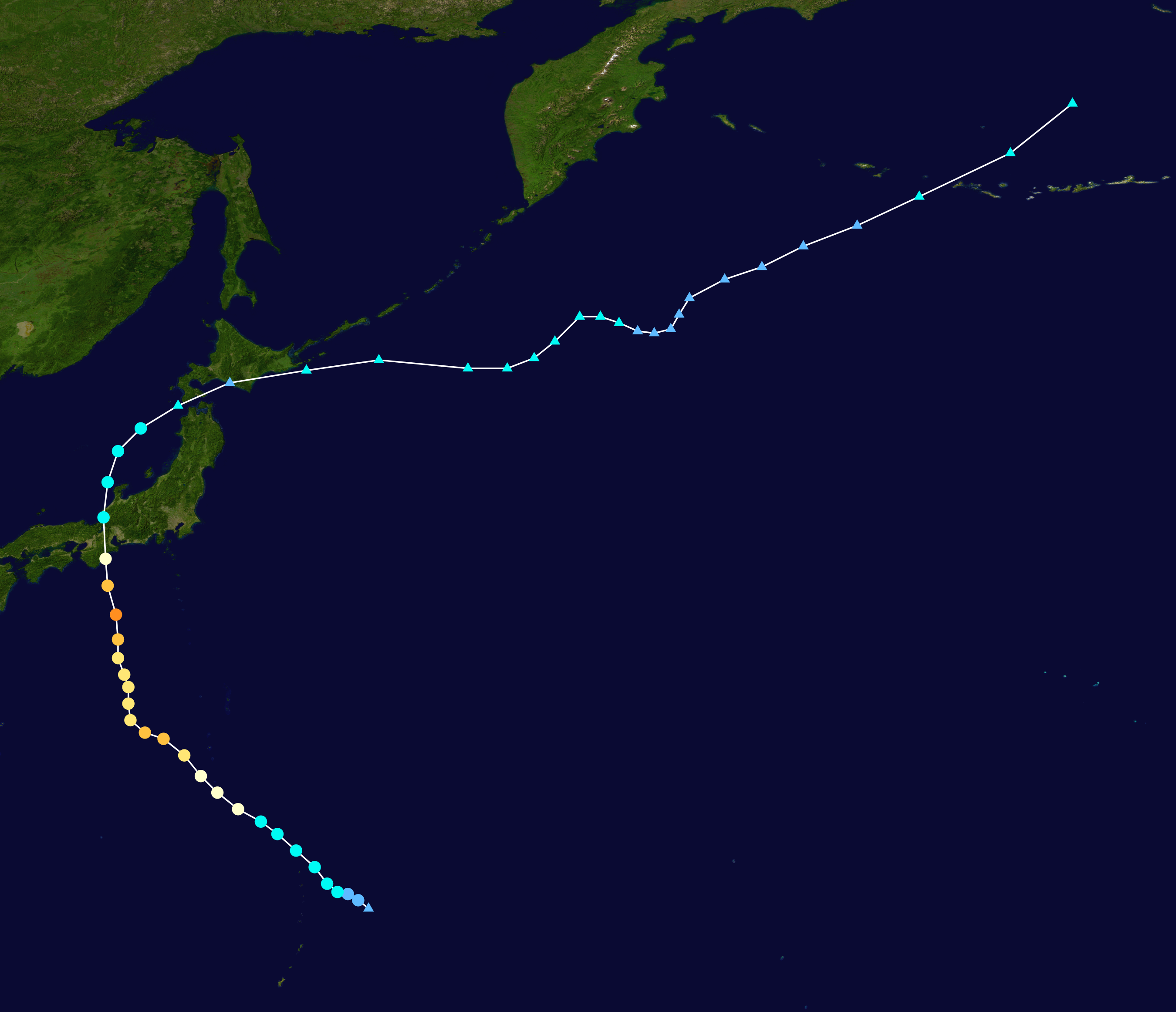
- Duration: August 20 – August 26
- Peak intensity: 215 km/h (130 mph) (1-min); 950 hPa (mbar)

A fractured portion of a surge from the westerlies became a tropical wave on August 20, just to the northeast of Saipan at the 150th meridian. The wave proceeded northwest, gaining strength and became a tropical storm on the morning of August 21. Named Thelma, the storm rapidly intensified north of Saipan, reaching winds of 70 mph (110 km/h). Operationally, the Joint Typhoon Warning Center found winds of 75 mp/h (120 km/h) and originally declared it a typhoon on the afternoon of August 21. The storm quickly weakened back to winds of 50 mph (80 km/h) before strengthening as Thelma neared the island of Iwo Jima. On the evening of August 22, south of Iwo Jima, the storm intensified into a typhoon, boasting winds of 90 mph (140 km/h).

Bending northwest and avoiding a direct hit with Iwo Jima, Thelma continued to rapidly strengthen, reaching an original peak of 125 mph (201 km/h) just west of the island on August 23. Making a bend towards the north, Thelma began weakening once again, reaching winds as low as 105 mph (169 km/h) west of Chichi Jima. Thelma began strengthening again on August 24, operationally reaching peak winds of 140 mph (230 km/h). However, in reanalysis, the system was dropped to winds of 135 mph (217 km/h). Crossing north, the storm approached the coast of Japan on August 25. Winds began to diminish as the storm was influenced by land, making landfall near Owase as a 105 mph (169 km/h) typhoon. The storm rapidly weakened as it crossed north across Japan, crossing into waters near Komatsu on August 26.

Experiencing the effects of cold air, Thelma bent northeast as a weakening tropical storm, crossing the northern end of the Japanese mainland near Goshogawara as a tropical depression on August 27. After re-entering waters, the storm lost tropical characteristics and became extratropical near Mount Apoi. The extratropical remains of Thelma wandered the open waters of the Pacific Ocean for several days, proceeding northeast through the water and into the Aleutian Islands, crossing over Little Sitkin Island. The system crossed into the Bering Sea, crossing the International Date Line on September 1. The system was lost just after crossing the Date Line.

=== Typhoon Vera ===
- Typhoon (JMA)
- Category 1-equivalent typhoon (SSHWS)
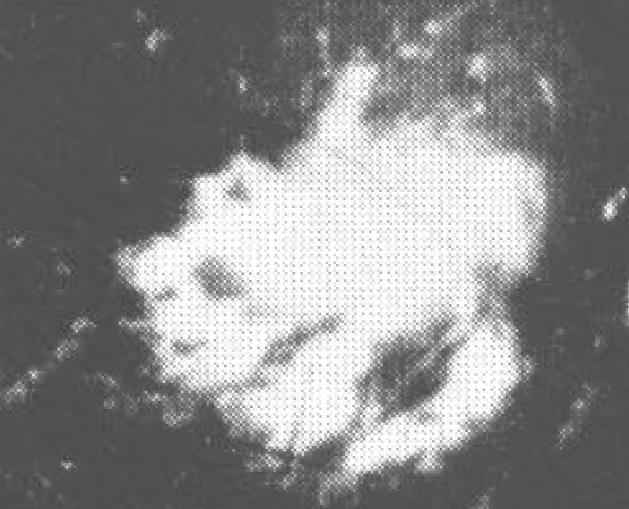
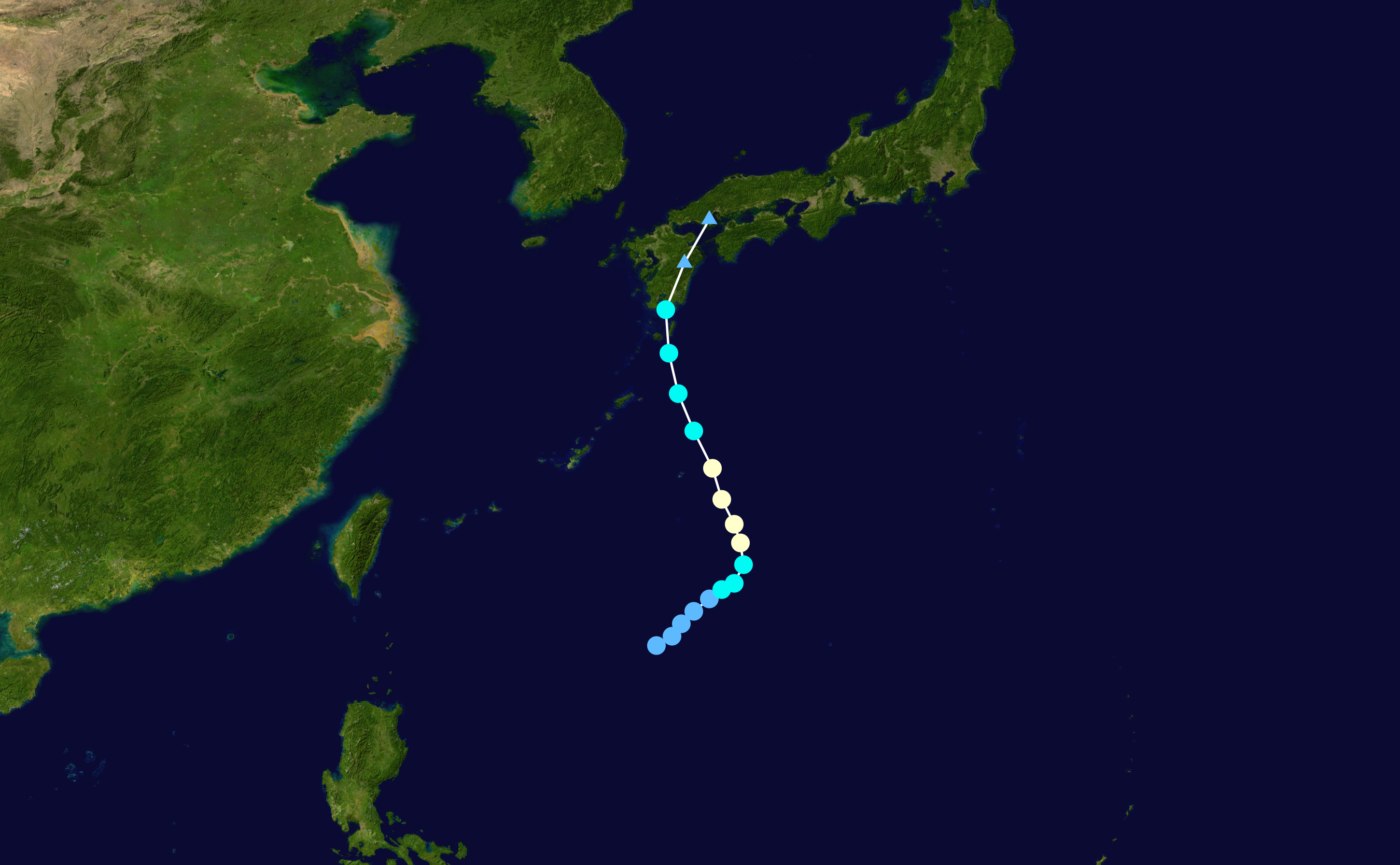
- Duration: August 25 – August 27
- Peak intensity: 130 km/h (80 mph) (1-min); 990 hPa (mbar)

A wave and a polar trough fractured to the southeast of Okinawa, Japan on the morning of August 23. The system slowly gained strength, forming into Tropical Storm Vera on the morning of August 25, a short distance to the northeast of the fractured trough. The storm continued northeast, becoming a typhoon that afternoon. Just after reaching typhoon strength, Vera bent northwest past Okinawa, strengthening to a peak of 80 mph (130 km/h) and an internal pressure of 983 millibars. Operationally, the peak of Vera was classified as 85 mph (137 km/h) on August 26. The storm only retained typhoon winds for 18 hours, weakening into a tropical storm on the morning of August 27. Passing east of Okinawa, Vera approached land, making landfall near Kagoshima on the afternoon of August 27, boasting winds of 60 mph (97 km/h).

Vera weakened rapidly over land, becoming a tropical depression within six hours of landfall, bending northeast over land. After crossing the southwestern end of Japan, the storm dissipated over land near Kudamatsu on the morning of August 28.

=== Typhoon Wanda ===
- Typhoon (JMA)
- Category 2-equivalent typhoon (SSHWS)
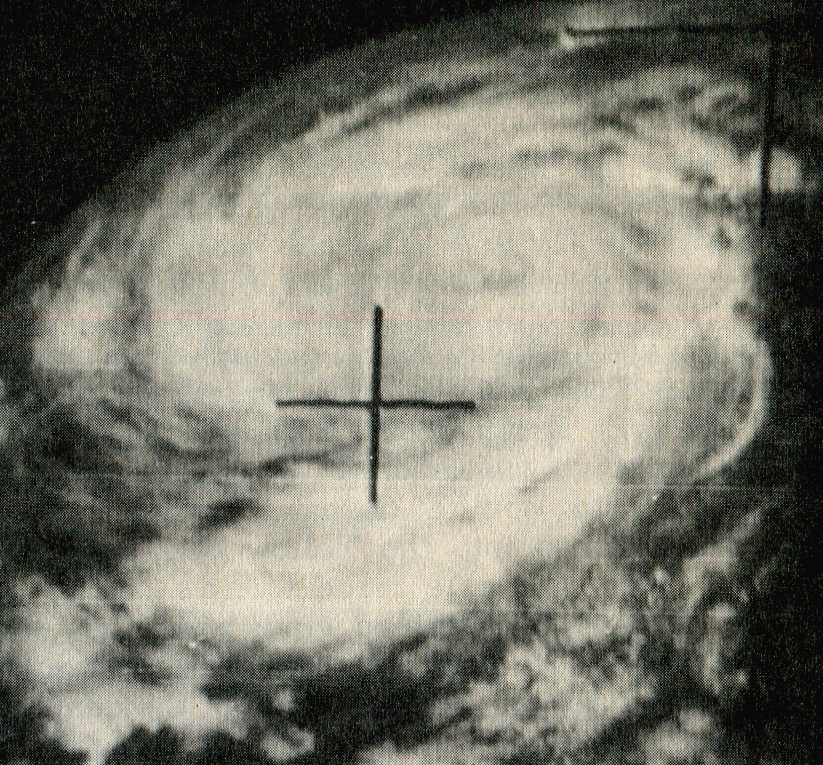
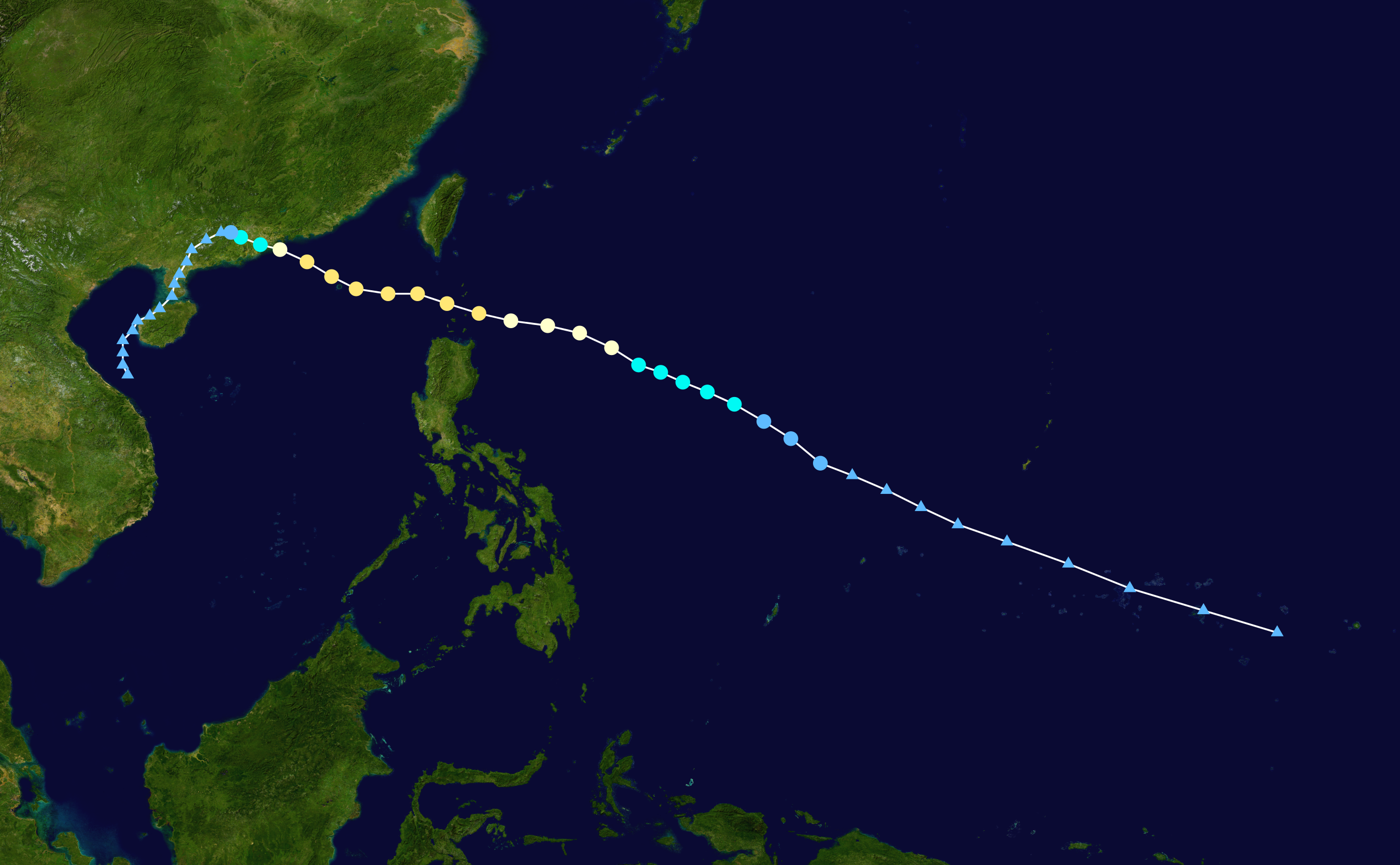
- Duration: August 26 – September 4
- Peak intensity: 175 km/h (110 mph) (1-min); 949 hPa (mbar)

The precursor easterly tropical wave that became Typhoon Wanda originated in the Southern Hemisphere, developing off the coast of Pohnpei (then-spelled Ponape) on the morning of August 23. The wave proceeded northwest for several days, passing south of Ponape, and north of Truk. The system continued past Guam and Yap before intensifying into a tropical depression on the afternoon of August 27. The depression continued northeast, and within six hours, became Tropical Storm Wanda, boasting winds of 40 mph (60 mph). Crossing far east of the coast of the Philippines, Wanda gradually strengthened as it proceeded northwest. On the morning of August 29, the storm gained typhoon strength, just north of Luzon. The storm continued to strengthen, passing south of Taiwan before peaking as a 110 mph (180 km/h) typhoon off the coast of Hong Kong on August 31.

Boasting a minimum pressure of 949 millibars, Wanda continued eastward through the South China Sea, making landfall near Hong Kong as a typhoon with winds of 100 mph (160 km/h) on the morning of September 1. After crossing onto land, Wanda weakened considerably, becoming a tropical depression within 18 hours. The storm dissipated over land west of Macau on the evening of September 1. However, the remains of Wanda crossed through the southern parts of China on September 1 and 2 before crossing back into the open waters of the South China Sea on September 3. The remains turned east and made landfall on Hainan near Lingao on September 4. The remains of Wanda dissipated over Hainan that day.

Wanda was responsible for 434 fatalities, with millions of damage occurring. Storm surge was significant in Hong Kong and the water level was 17'9" above chart datum in some places. Maximum hourly mean wind and instantaneous minimum pressure at the Royal Observatory were 68 knots (126 km/h) and 953 mbar. Neither record has been surpassed since then. Wanda is considered the second worst typhoon in the recorded history of Hong Kong (second only to the catastrophic typhoon of July 29, 1896. Wanda also created the record of being the last of three typhoons to have caused sustained hurricane winds in Hong Kong in three consecutive years (after Typhoon Mary of 1960 and Typhoon Alice of 1961).

=== Typhoon Amy ===
- Typhoon (JMA)
- Category 5-equivalent super typhoon (SSHWS)
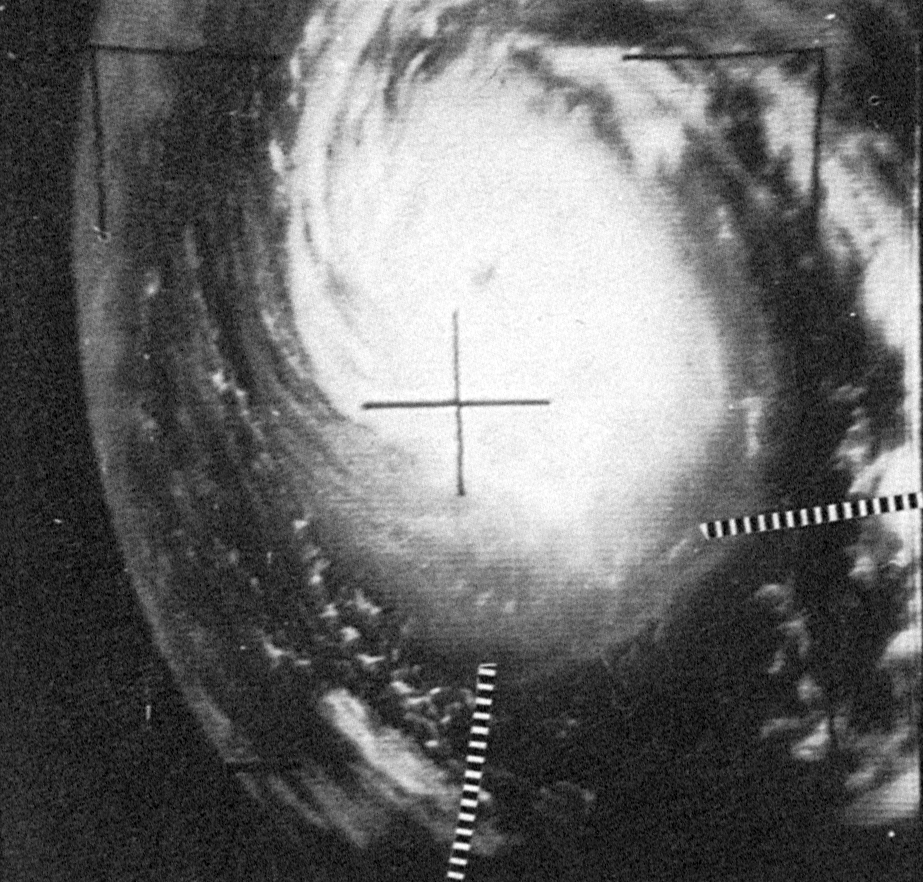
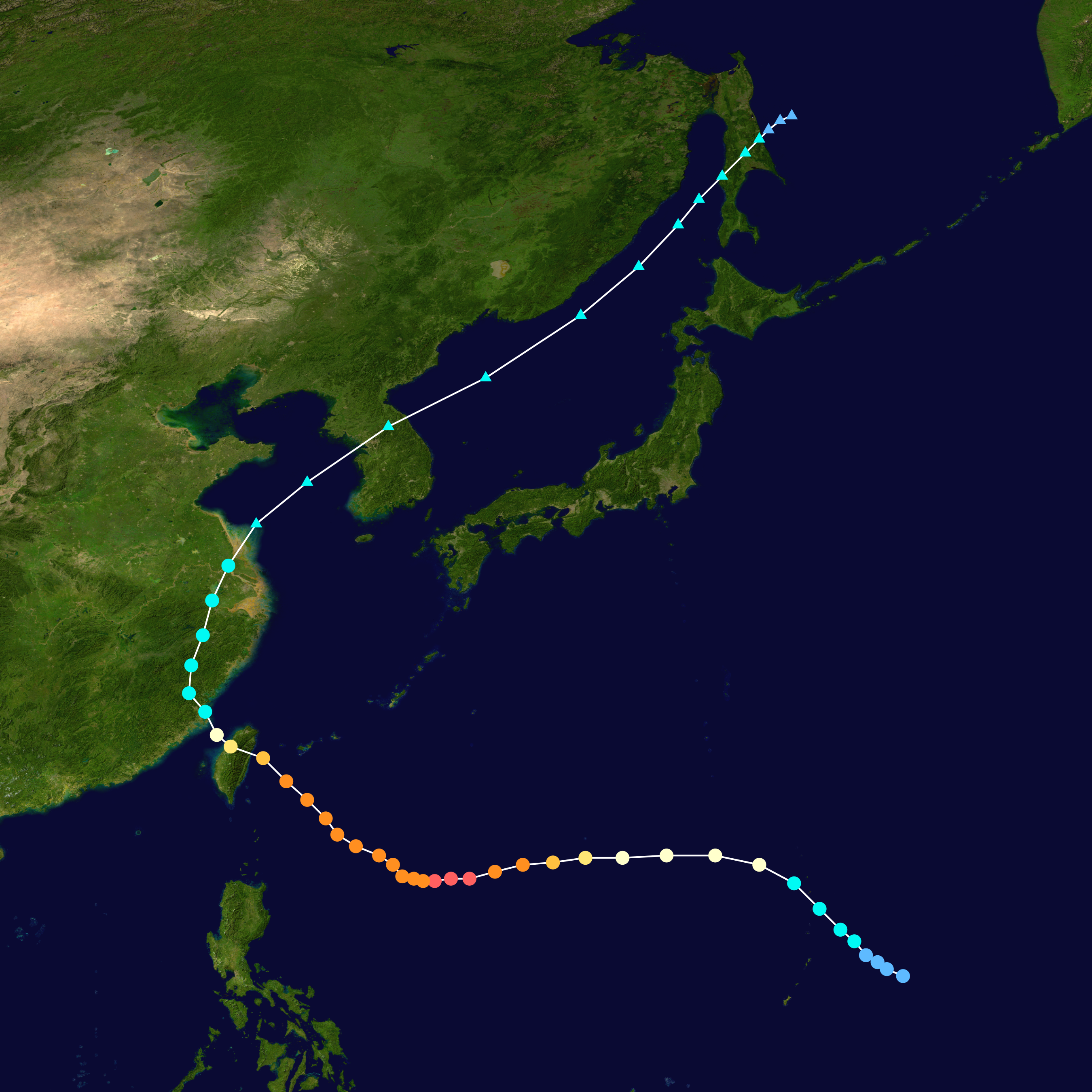
- Duration: August 28 – September 7
- Peak intensity: 260 km/h (160 mph) (1-min); 935 hPa (mbar)

The precursor to Typhoon Amy formed on August 27 northwest of Truk as a surge from the westerlies. The system rapidly gained strength in the open waters of the Pacific Ocean, gaining enough winds to be declared a tropical depression on the morning of August 29. The depression rapidly intensified, becoming a tropical storm within six hours. Now named Amy, the cyclone bent northeast around Saipan with winds of 70 mph (110 km/h). After passing Saipan, Amy strengthened into a typhoon during the afternoon of August 30. Continuing to rapidly strengthen over water, Amy reached its peak wind speed of 160 mph (260 km/h) on evening of September 1, far to the northeast of the Philippines. After peaking with a pressure of 935 millibars, the typhoon weakened back to 155 mph (249 km/h) and soon 150 mph (240 km/h), which it sustained for several days.

Crossing to the northeast of Luzon, Amy maintained strength, rapidly approaching the island of Taiwan on September 4. The storm slowly weakened to a 115 mph (185 km/h) typhoon off the coast of Taiwan, making landfall on September 5 near the city of Yilan City. Amy weakened over land slightly before making landfall near Fuzhou later that day. Amy crossed over mainland China for several days, slowly weakening into a minimal tropical storm before crossing back into the waters of the East China Sea near Yancheng. Amy strengthened back to winds of 45 mph (72 km/h) before weakening into a tropical depression off the coast of South Korea. The depression made landfall near Incheon on September 7, weakening over land. After crossing out into open waters, the remains of Amy became extratropical on September 8, affected by the cold air.

The extratropical remains of Amy continued northeast along the North Korean and Chinese mainlands, crossing the island of Sakhalin on September 9. The remains of Amy were lost off the eastern coast of Sakhalin on September 10, west of the Kamchatka Peninsula.

Amy's flooding killed 24 people, with millions of dollars in damage (1962 USD) to crops, power, communication lines and buildings.

=== Tropical Depression Sixty-Four ===
- Tropical depression (JMA)
- Tropical depression (SSHWS)
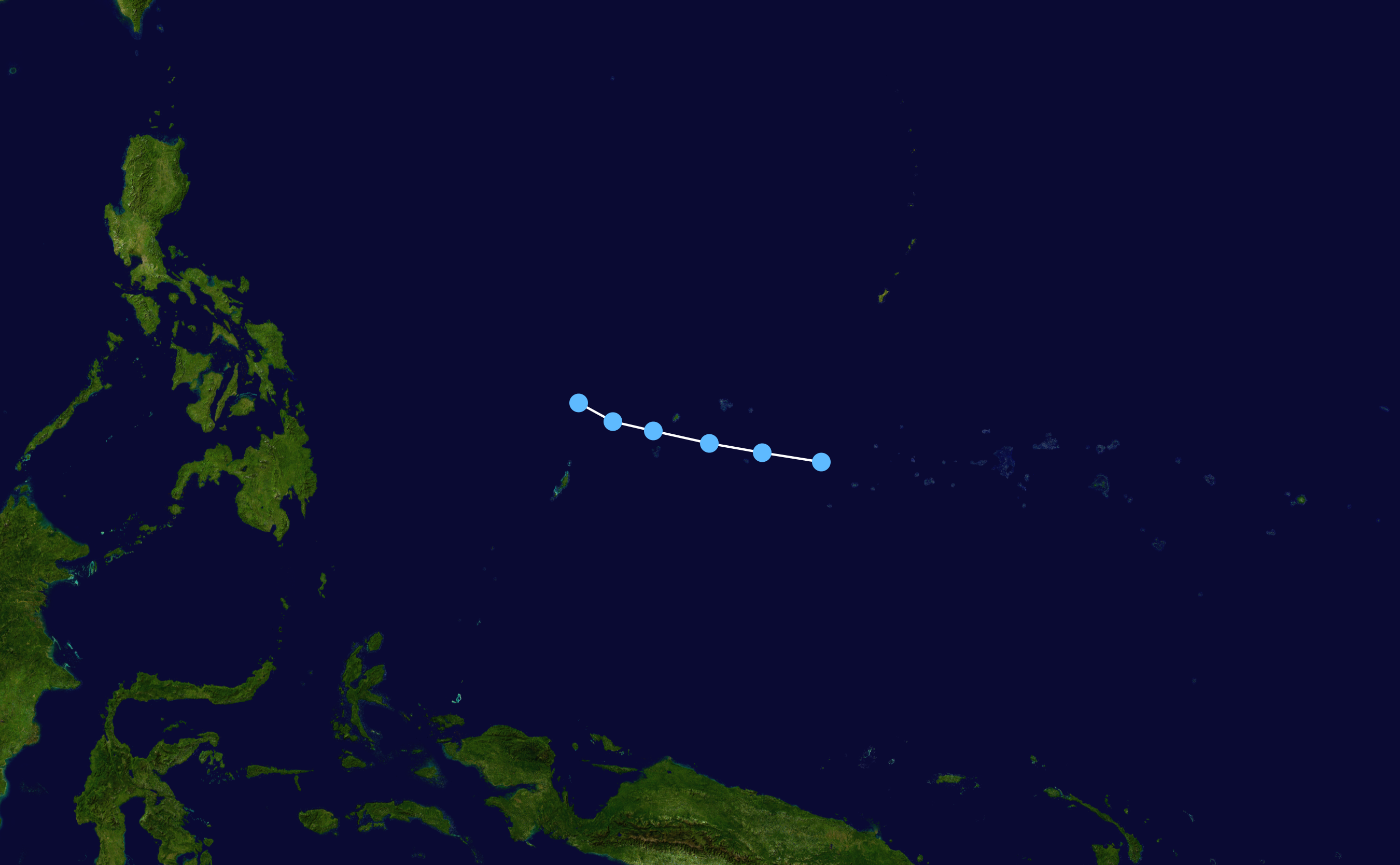
- Duration: September 3 – September 6
- Peak intensity: 55 km/h (35 mph) (1-min); 1006 hPa (mbar)

An easterly tropical wave formed off northwest of Woleai Atoll and Buoy 317 (off the coast of Woleai) on September 3. The Joint Typhoon Warning Center upgraded the wave that same day into Tropical Depression Sixty-Four. The depression progressed to the northeast, passing to the south of Ulithi six hours after formation. The depression continued, passing to the south of Yap, an island near Ulithi. It then began to straighten its progression, dissipating north of the island of Koror at about 135°W longitude. Once the depression dissipated, the Joint Typhoon Warning Center ceased tracking the depression, never making landfall with any landmass in the Pacific Ocean.

=== Tropical Storm Sixty-Six ===
- Tropical storm (JMA)
- Tropical storm (SSHWS)
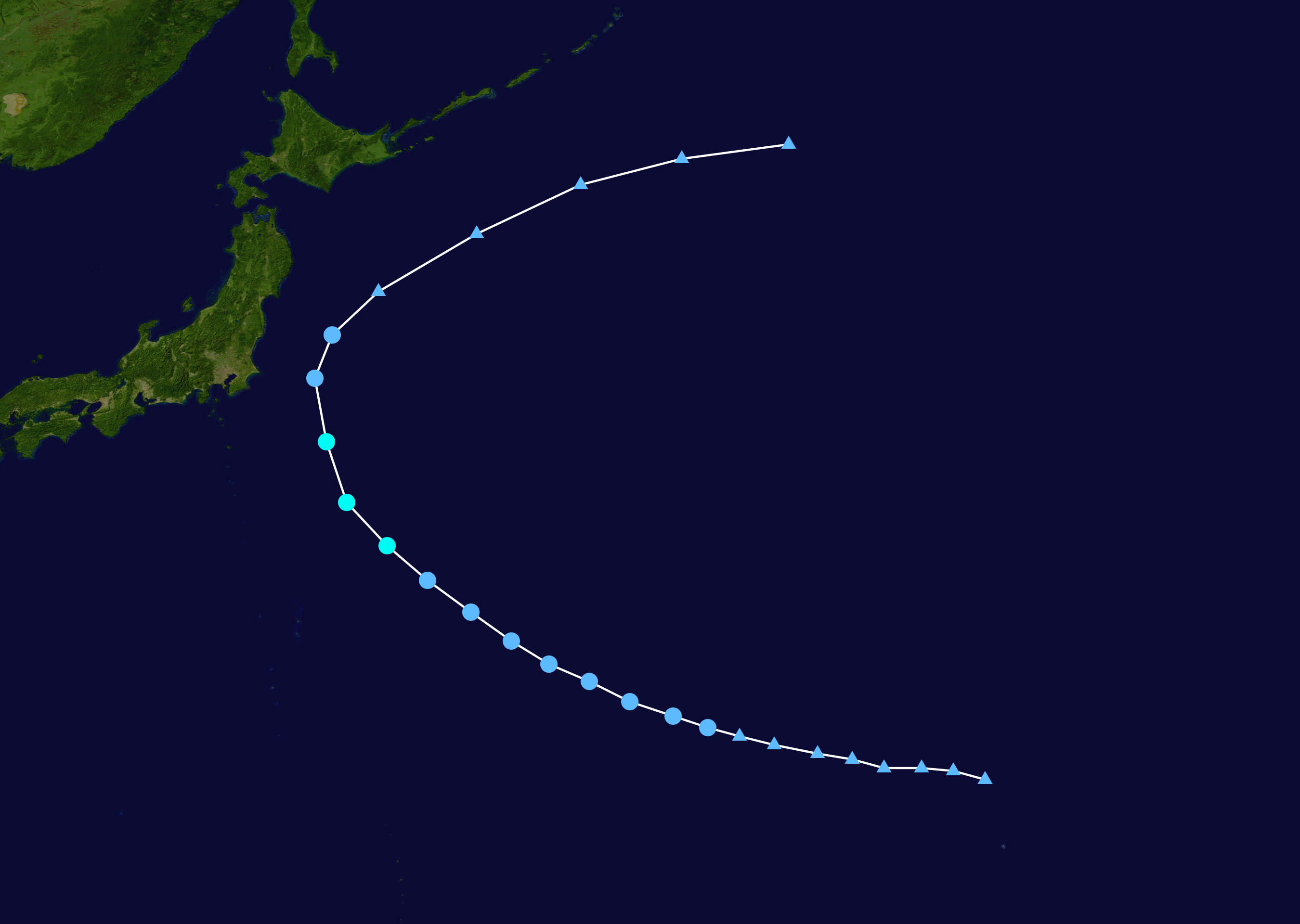
- Duration: September 11 – September 16
- Peak intensity: 65 km/h (40 mph) (1-min); 1002 hPa (mbar)

Like most of the tropical cyclones of the season, the sixty-sixth formed on September 11, around where Tropical Depression Fifty-Five had formed earlier in the season. The Joint Typhoon Warning Center began following the disturbance, which was out in the open Pacific Ocean. The disturbance was upgraded into a tropical depression on September 12. The depression progressed westward, with the Japan Meteorological Agency following suit as a tropical depression. As the depression became to make a curve towards Japan, the Joint Typhoon Warning Center ceased tracking the depression.

However, the Japan Meteorological Agency continued following the strengthening depression. The depression, beginning to parallel the coast of Japan, strengthened into a tropical storm on September 15. The depression peaked in intensity with a pressure of 1002 mbar (29.58 inHg) on the same day, at its closest proximity to Japan. The storm weakened into a tropical depression on September 16, and started to make a curve to the northeast. The depression moved away from the coast of Japan and began its track out into the Pacific on September 17. The Japan Meteorological Agency ceased following the system that day, located off the Kuril Islands of the Soviet Union. During its entire lifetime, the depression never made landfall.

=== Tropical Storm Babe ===
- Tropical storm (JMA)
- Tropical storm (SSHWS)
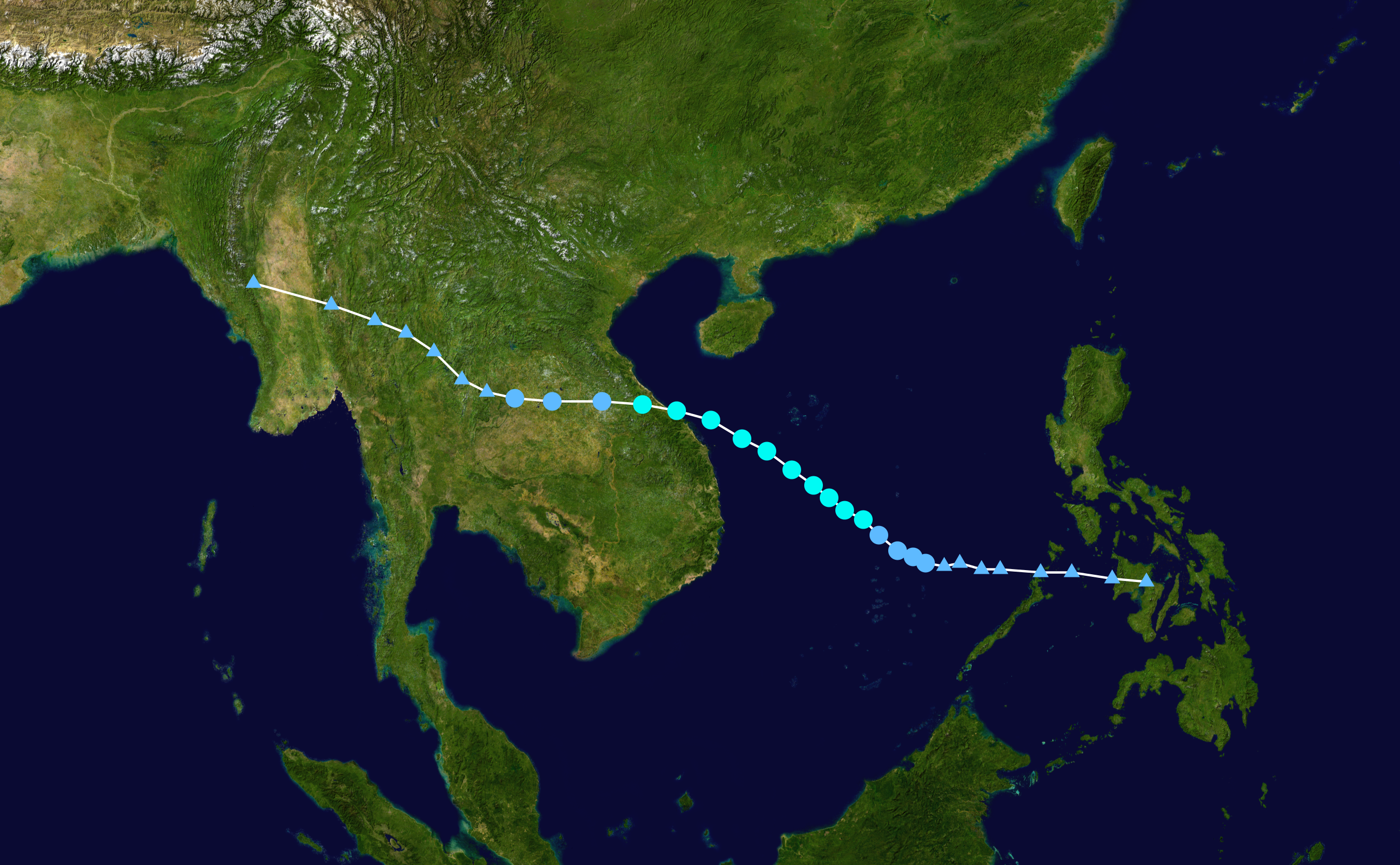
- Duration: September 11 – September 18
- Peak intensity: 100 km/h (65 mph) (1-min); 994 hPa (mbar)

The sixty-seventh tropical wave of the 1962 season formed on September 11 over several islands in the Philippines. Tracked by the Japan Meteorological Agency, the wave began progressing westward, passing over the tip of an island in the South China Sea. On September 13, about midway between South Vietnam and the Philippines, the Joint Typhoon Warning Center upgraded the system to Tropical Depression Sixty-Seven. There, the depression made a curve to the northwest, starting a progression in that direction. The depression continued for another two days out into the South China Sea, where the storm was upgraded to Tropical Storm Babe.

Tropical Storm Babe continued to the northwest, making its way towards the coast of South Vietnam. On September 15, Tropical Storm Babe passed to the south of Hainan, an island claimed as part of China. The storm peaked at 65 mph (105 km/h) winds on the same day, with a minimal pressure of 995 millibars of Mercury). On September 16, Tropical Storm Babe made landfall in the northern part of the South Vietnam coast. The depression then crossed the country, weakening into a tropical depression on September 17, crossing over the country of Laos. The Joint Typhoon Warning Center ceased following the system just after it left Laos.

The weakening system tracked into Cambodia, where it lasted for another day or so. On the evening of September 18, the Agency stopped following the weakening system, as it began to leave Cambodia and into the nearby country of Thailand.

=== Tropical Depression Sixty-Eight ===
- Tropical depression (JMA)
- Tropical depression (SSHWS)
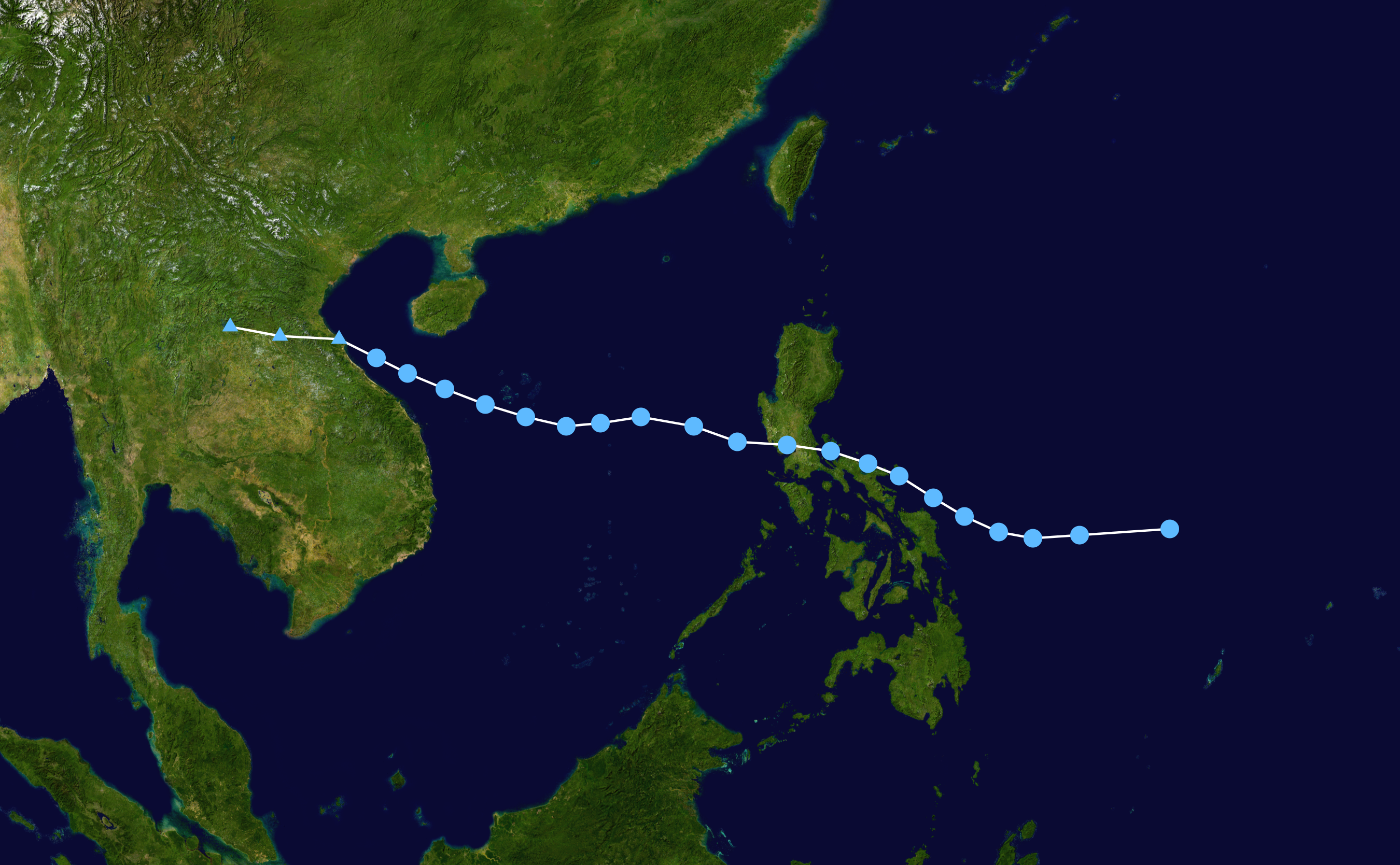
- Duration: September 23 – September 28
- Peak intensity: 55 km/h (35 mph) (1-min); 1002 hPa (mbar)

The sixty-eighth easterly tropical wave of the 1962 season formed on September 22 a couple of hundred miles off the coast of the Philippines. The Joint Typhoon Warning Center then upgraded the wave into Tropical Depression Sixty-Eight that day. The depression made a curve to the southwest, turning to the northwest just a few hours later. After starting a northwest progression, Tropical Depression Sixty-Eight began running along the eastern coast of the Philippines. The depression eventually switched to a straightened, westward progression, as the cyclone neared landfall. On the afternoon of September 24, Tropical Depression Sixty-Eight made landfall on the eastern shore of southern Luzon. The depression crossed the country, maintaining its strength.

The depression crossed over the capital of the Philippines, Manila and in six hours after landfall, the depression had returned to water. The depression then began its northwestern progression once again, heading on a path towards China. However, Tropical Depression Sixty-Eight turned to the southwest and away from China. This progression did not last either. The system turned back to the northwest, heading towards North Vietnam. This progression remained stable, and the depression made landfall on September 26 in North Vietnam. Tropical Depression Sixty-Eight crossed over land, dissipating the next day nearing the Laos border.

=== Typhoon Carla ===
- Typhoon (JMA)
- Category 1-equivalent typhoon (SSHWS)
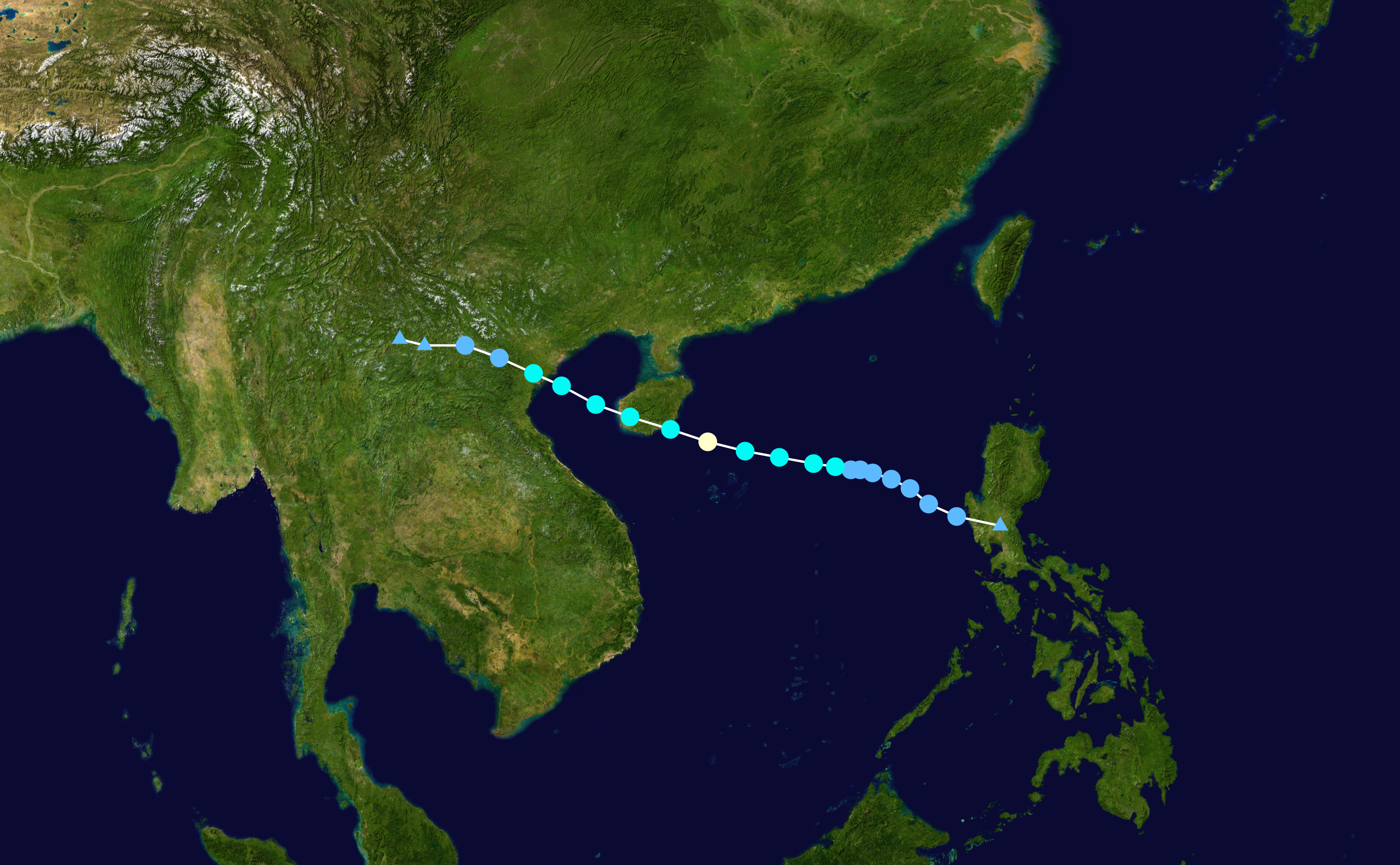
- Duration: September 18 – September 23
- Peak intensity: 130 km/h (80 mph) (1-min); 985 hPa (mbar)

The system that became Typhoon Carla can be traced to a surge from the westerlies that formed on September 13 between Guam and Koror. The system proceeded northwest for several days, slowly gaining strength. The system crossed over the Philippines near Luzon on September 18 and crossed into the South China Sea. In the open sea waters, the system strengthened, attaining tropical depression status on the morning of September 19, northwest of Manila. The depression continued northwest throughout the day, becoming Tropical Storm Carla on the morning of September 20, miles west of Luzon. After attaining tropical storm strength, Carla slowly gathered strength, approaching the island of Hainan. On the afternoon of September 21, Carla attained typhoon strength for six hours, reaching a peak winds of 80 mph (130 km/h).

After peaking, Carla immediately made landfall near Lingshui on the afternoon of September 21 with winds of 60 mph (97 km/h). After crossing over Hainan, Carla re-entered water and became a tropical storm with winds of 65 mph (105 km/h) on September 22. Later that day, Carla made landfall near Ninh Binh, North Vietnam with winds of 65 mph (105 km/h). Now over land, the storm void of moisture, weakened across Thailand, dissipating near the Laos-Thailand border on September 23.

No damage reports are available in association with Carla in Thailand, however at least 13 people were killed.

=== Typhoon Dinah ===
- Typhoon (JMA)
- Category 3-equivalent typhoon (SSHWS)
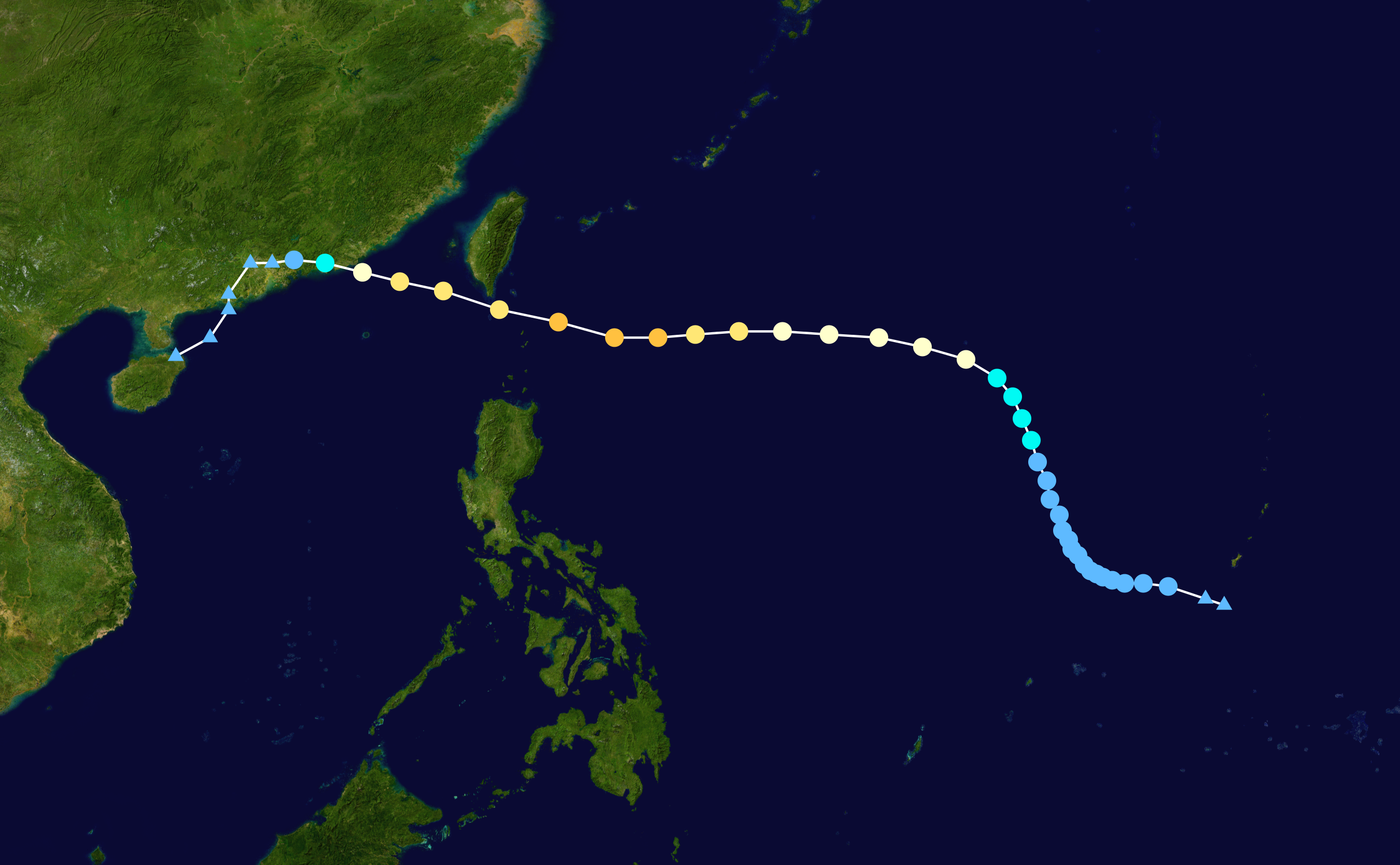
- Duration: September 24 – October 5
- Peak intensity: 185 km/h (115 mph) (1-min); 955 hPa (mbar)

In a similar fashion to the origins of Typhoon Carla, a surge from the westerlies helped for the next storm of the season on the afternoon of September 24 near Guam. The system quickly intensified into a tropical depression on the morning of September 25 near Ulithi. Upon strengthening into a depression, the system slowed down significantly and stopped intensifying, stabilizing at winds of 35 mph from September 25–28. During this time, the depression turned northwest, strengthening into Tropical Storm Dinah on the morning of September 29. Wind speed and forward movement remained slow to strengthen with Dinah, as it bent northwest and west far from Iwo Jima. The storm, proceeding west through the Pacific Ocean, strengthened into a typhoon on the morning of September 30.

Winding west through the open waters of the Pacific, Dinah crossed south of Taiwan, peaking at winds of 115 mph (185 km/h) just south of the island on October 2. With a peak pressure of 953 millibars, Dinah continued east, weakening to winds of 105 mph (169 km/h) on October 3. That afternoon, Dinah made landfall near Hong Kong with winds of 105 mph (169 km/h). The storm weakened rapidly over land, becoming a tropical storm and soon depression. Dinah dissipated over mainland China on October 4. The remains of Dinah turned southeast across China, re-entering waters before crossing Hainan on October 5. That afternoon, the remains dissipated over Hainan.

=== Typhoon Emma ===
- Typhoon (JMA)
- Category 5-equivalent super typhoon (SSHWS)
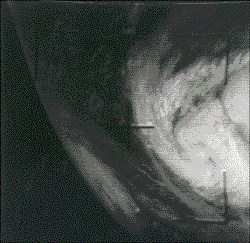
- Duration: September 28 – October 12
- Peak intensity: 260 km/h (160 mph) (1-min); 890 hPa (mbar)

A surge from the westerlies that moved into the easterlies helped spawn the system that would become Typhoon Emma on September 30 off the coast of Saipan. The system strengthened in a tropical storm on the afternoon of October 1, with sustained winds of 60 mph (97 km/h). The storm, named Emma, made a U-turn to the north just north of Saipan, avoiding direct impact with the island. Emma continued to slowly intensify, becoming a typhoon on the morning of October 2. The typhoon continued north through the open Pacific waters, rapidly intensifying. On the morning of October 5, Emma reached an operation peak intensity of 145 mph (233 km/h). However, in post-analysis, the JTWC increased the peak to 160 mph (260 km/h), with an internal pressure of 903 millibars.

After reaching its peak, Emma slowly weakened as it turned from a northern progression towards the east on October 5. Passing far to the east of Iwo Jima, Emma maintained winds for several days out in the open waters at 125 mph (201 km/h). On the morning of October 9, Emma weakened a slight, soon bending to the northeast. Beginning to be influenced by cold air, the system weakened slowly through the open waters, reducing itself to a Category 1 typhoon on the morning of October 8. The system was deemed extratropical operationally on the afternoon of October 11, with winds of 80 mph (130 km/h) due to cold air. However, in post-analysis, the system crossed further to the northwest, weakening stopped and for the next day and a half, Emma actually gained winds back to 85 mph (137 km/h).

On the morning of October 13, the storm crossed into the Bering Sea near Little Sitkin Island. Shortly later on that day, Emma crossed the 180th meridian as a 50 mph (80 km/h) tropical storm. After weakening into a tropical depression, the storm became extratropical off the coast of Alaska.

Damage in Guam and Saipan totaled out at $250,000 (1962 USD), from damages to communication equipment, buildings and fishing boats.

=== Typhoon Freda ===
- Typhoon (JMA)
- Category 3-equivalent typhoon (SSHWS)
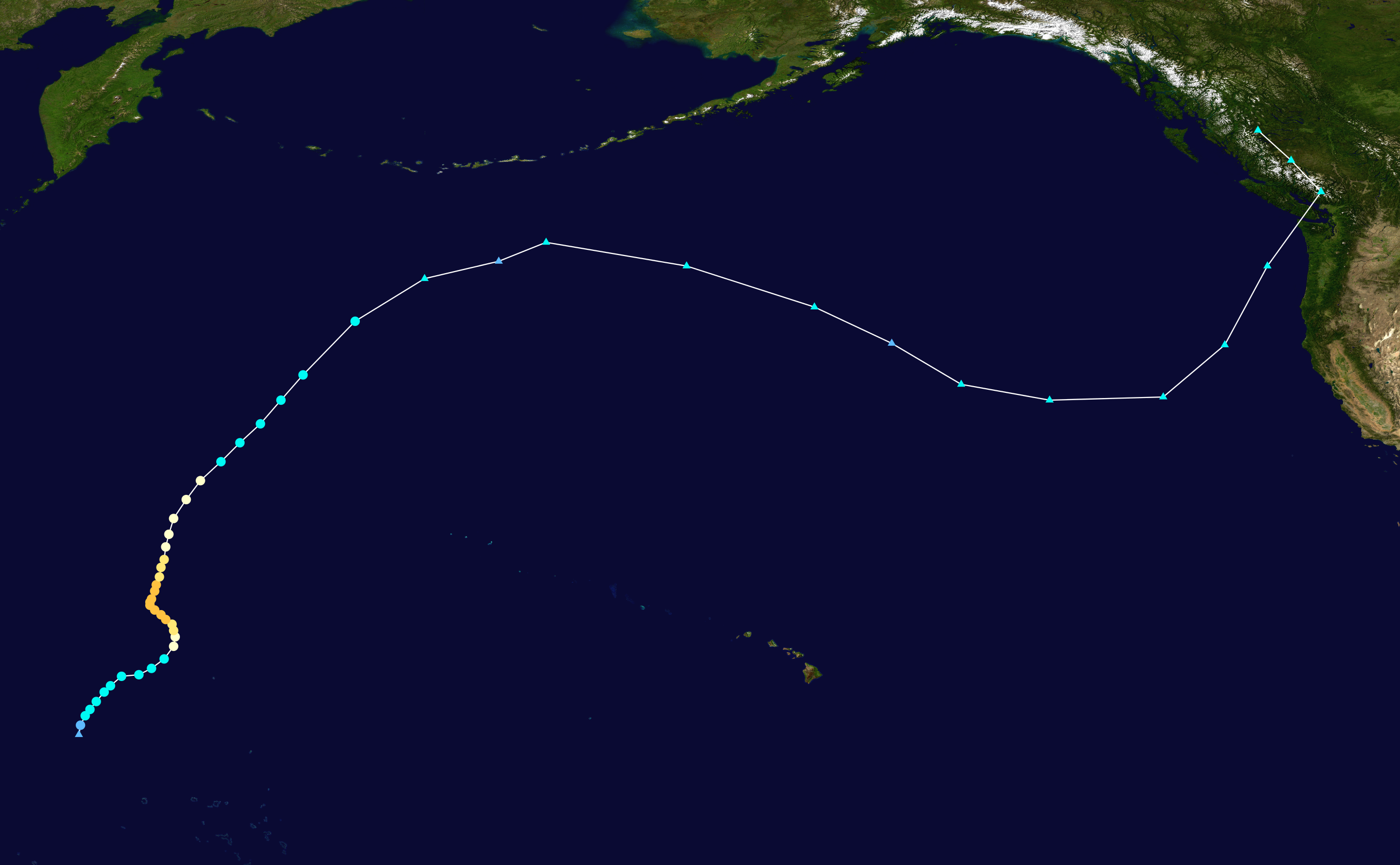
- Duration: October 3 – October 10
- Peak intensity: 185 km/h (115 mph) (1-min); 950 hPa (mbar)

An updraft formed on the morning of September 28 south of the island of Eniwetok Atoll. After moving west and making a large bend around the island, the new system slowly gained strength, and on the morning of October 3, promoted into a tropical storm. Now named Freda, the system was rapidly intensifying as it proceeded north-west in the open Pacific Ocean waters. On that afternoon, Freda intensified into a typhoon, sustaining winds of 80 mph (130 km/h). During the day of October 4, the typhoon slowly gained strength, reaching its peak of 115 mph (185 km/h) with a peak pressure of 948 millibars (27.99 inHg). After stabilizing to the north, Freda sustained its winds through the Pacific before beginning to weaken slowly on October 6. Making a bend to the northeast, Freda sustained typhoon-status winds for several more days, weakening into a tropical storm on October 9 as it started experiencing the effects of cold air.

Moving north-east at a steady rate of 16 mph (26 km/h), the storm slowly became extratropical operationally on the morning of October 10, still with winds of 45 mph (72 km/h). However, the system continued weakening in post-analysis as it continued north-east, crossing the 180th meridian later that afternoon before completing the transition that evening. The extratropical remains of Freda would continue east through the Pacific Ocean, making landfall in the Pacific Northwest of Canada & the United States on October 12, 1962.

This same storm was named the Columbus Day Storm in the United States, where it caused $235 million in damage and the deaths of 46 people. In the early hours of October 13 the storm made landfall in British Columbia, Canada with sustained wind speeds of 90 km/h (56 mph) with gusts to 145 km/h (90 mph), causing $750 million in damage and the deaths of 7 people.

=== Typhoon Gilda ===
- Typhoon (JMA)
- Category 4-equivalent typhoon (SSHWS)
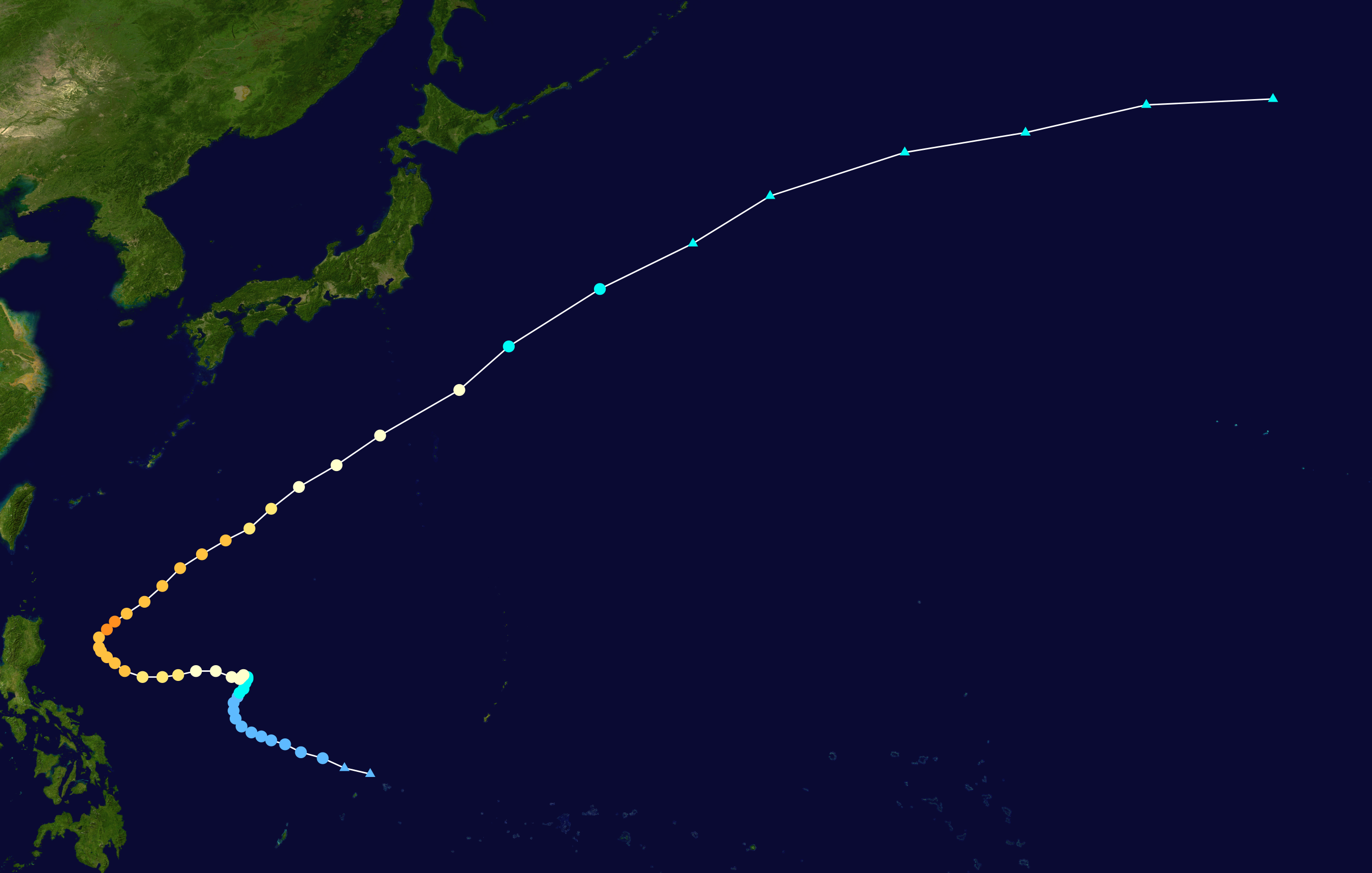
- Duration: October 18 – October 30
- Peak intensity: 215 km/h (130 mph) (1-min); 955 hPa (mbar)

A surge from the westerlies and a flow from the Southern Hemisphere helped contribute to the formation of a system off the coast of Yap on October 18. The system quickly intensified, becoming a tropical depression on the morning of October 19, sustaining winds of 25 mph (40 km/h). The depression slowly intensified as it moved northwest, spending three days a tropical depression. Bending northward, the system intensified into a minimal tropical storm on the morning of October 22. Now steadily intensifying, the new Tropical Storm Gilda began making a loop in the open ocean waters, becoming a typhoon on the morning of October 23 with winds of 75 mph (120 km/h). The storm, now proceeding westward, continued a steady intensification process, proceeding west towards the eastern coast of the Philippines.

On the morning of October 26, the storm bent to the northwest, and away from the Philippine coastline, while peaking at sustained winds of 130 mph (210 km/h). A peak minimum internal pressure of 933 millibars (27.55 inHg) was also recorded. Continuing northeast, the storm began a Fujiwhara interaction with the weakening Tropical Storm Ivy, soon absorbing the system on October 28. Gilda continued northeast through the ocean, slowly weakening as it sped up through colder air. Retaining typhoon-status winds for several days, passing southeast of Japan. As the storm sped up, it reached a peak speed of 44 mph (71 km/h). Gilda weakened into a tropical storm on the morning of October 30, southeast of Tokyo and later that evening, the storm completed the extratropical transition. The extratropical system continued northeast through the night, crossing the 170th and 180th meridians before being lost in the open waters of the Central Pacific Ocean on November 1.

No damage or fatalities were reported in association with Gilda.

=== Tropical Depression Seventy-Five ===
- Tropical depression (JMA)
- Tropical depression (SSHWS)
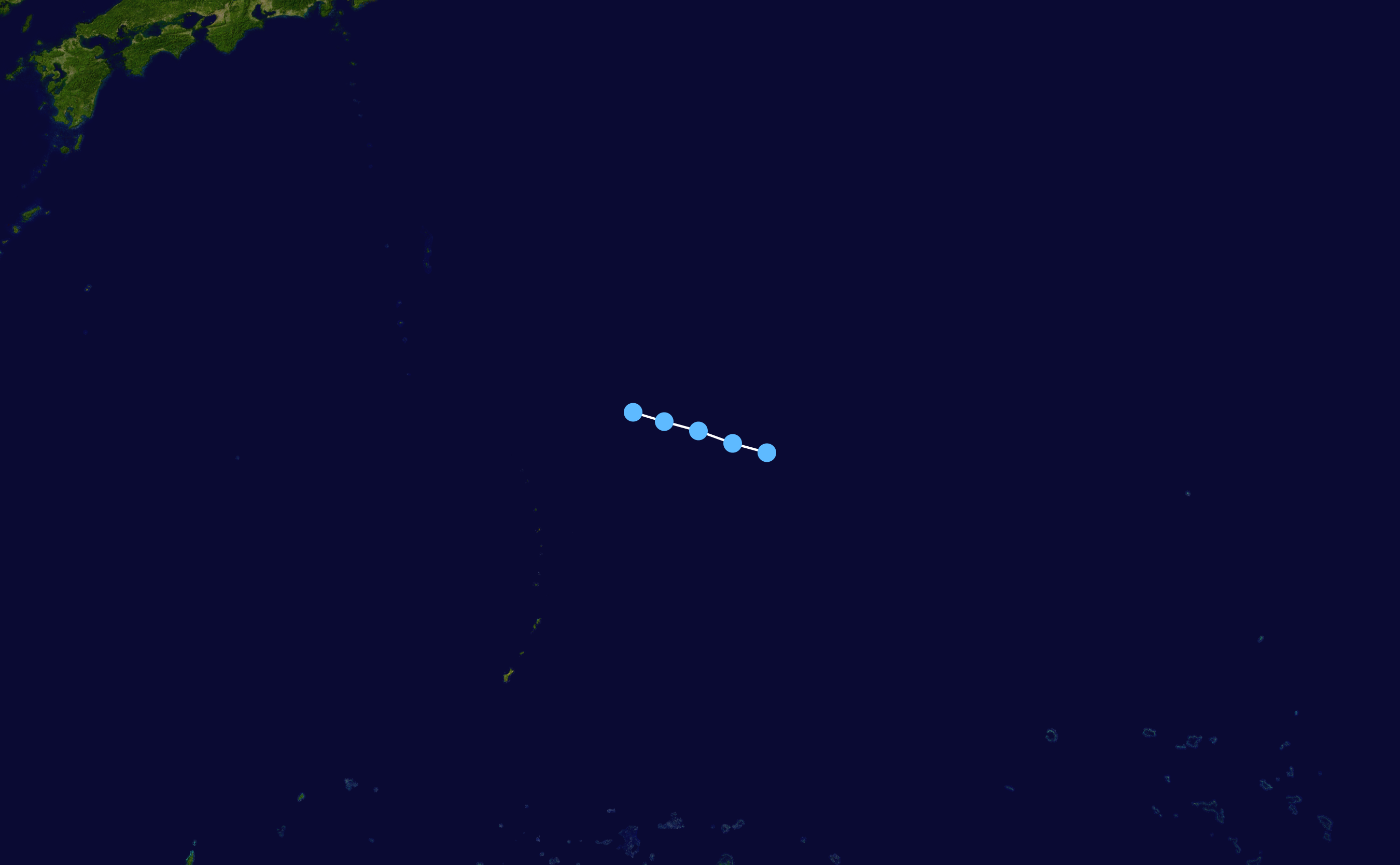
- Duration: October 21 – October 21
- Peak intensity: 55 km/h (35 mph) (1-min); 1008 hPa (mbar)

Tropical Depression Seventy-Five formed on October 20 in the open Pacific Ocean, near a buoy close to the International Date Line. The depression moved to the northwest, dissipating on after two days near the island of Iwo Jima. The short-lived system never made landfall, and no damage or fatalities were reported to ships or buoys in the Ocean.

=== Tropical Storm Harriet ===
- Tropical storm (JMA)
- Tropical storm (SSHWS)
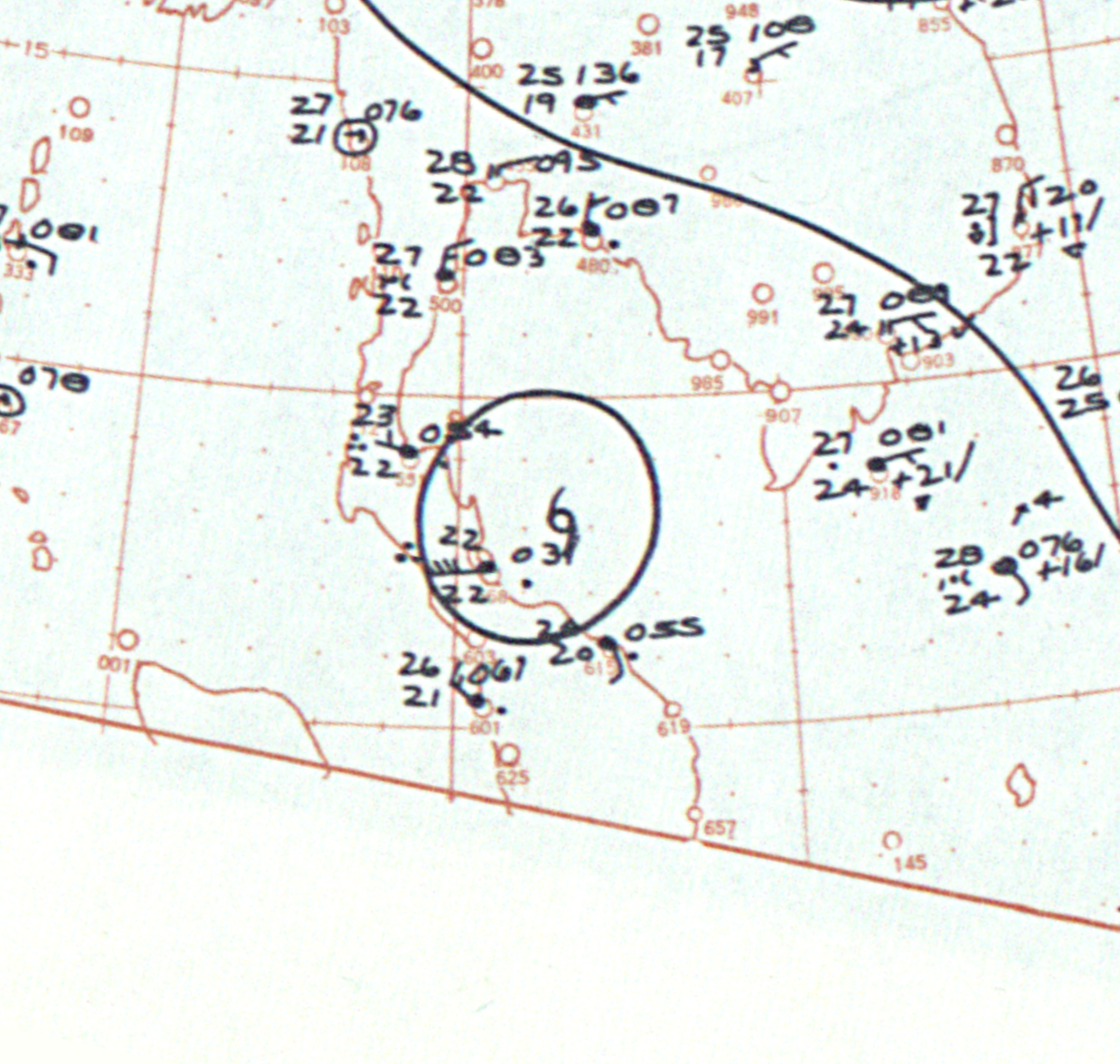
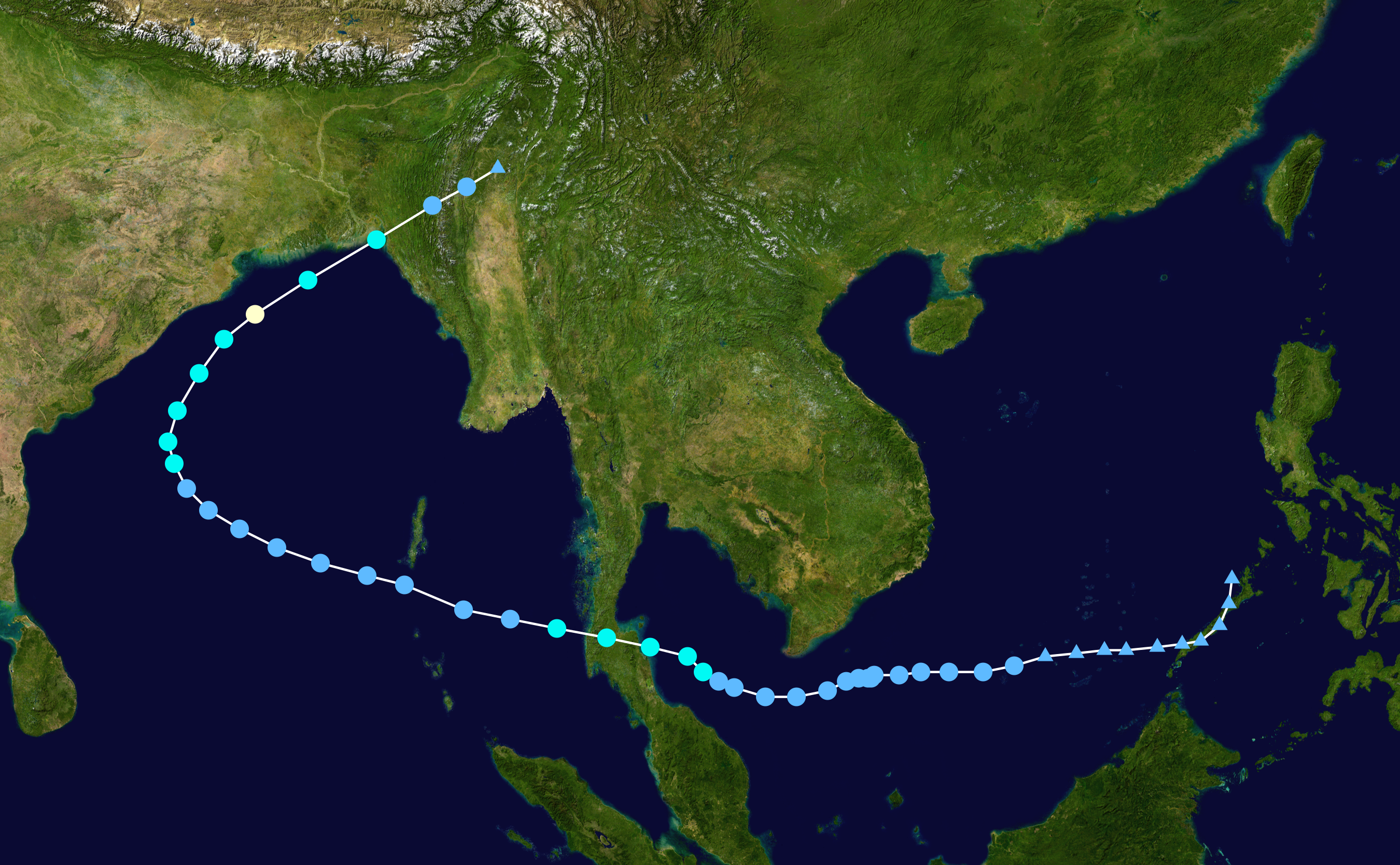
- Duration: October 19 – October 26
- Peak intensity: 95 km/h (60 mph) (1-min); 1000 hPa (mbar)

The system that would become Tropical Storm Harriet formed off the western coast of the Philippines on the morning on the afternoon of October 19. The system proceeded northwest, then darted southwest off the coast, crossing through the South China Sea. The storm spent several days through the open ocean, unable to strengthen into a tropical depression. On October 23, the storm turned northward towards South Vietnam, but soon returned westward, slowly strengthening as it crossed the South China Sea. On the afternoon of October 25, the system finally strengthened into a tropical storm, receiving the name of Harriet. Winds peaked at 60 mph (95 km/h) for Harriet, which soon made landfall near the Nakhon Si Thammarat Province in Thailand on October 25. After criss-crossing the country, Harriet weakened into a low on October 26 in the open waters of the Indian Ocean.

The destruction from Tropical Storm Harriet took the lives of at least 769 residents of Thailand's southern provinces. 142 others were also deemed missing as of November 4, with over 252 severe injuries. Damage at the time was estimated to be over $34.5 million (1962 USD) to government buildings, agriculture, homes and fishing fleets.

According to Thai Meteorological Department, Harriet was the deadliest tropical cyclone in the country, responsible for 935 deaths.

=== Typhoon Ivy ===
- Typhoon (JMA)
- Category 3-equivalent typhoon (SSHWS)
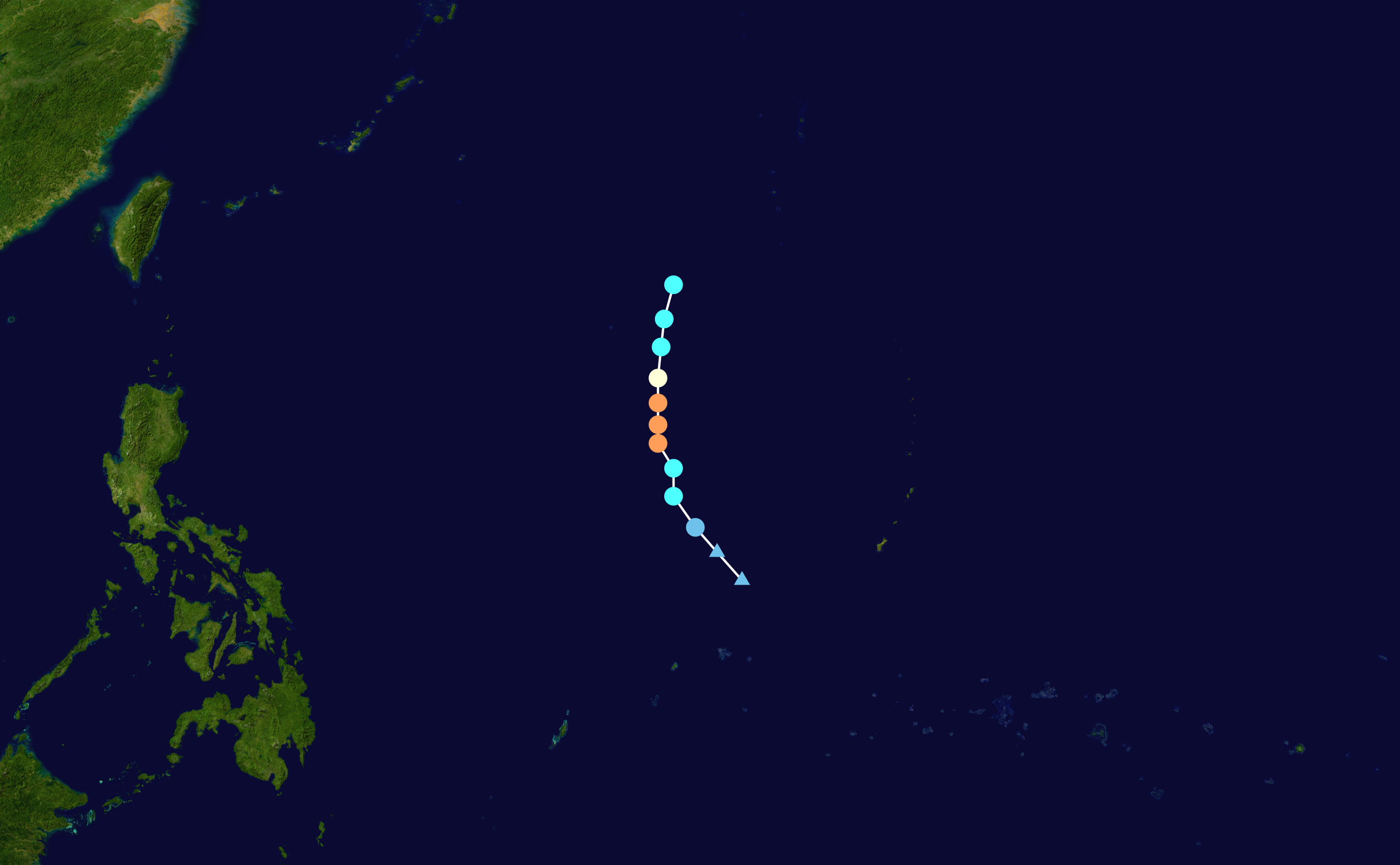
- Duration: October 27 – October 29
- Peak intensity: 185 km/h (115 mph) (1-min); 996 hPa (mbar)

A tropical wave formed on October 26 near Ulithi and Woleai Atoll. The wave moved to the northwest and strengthened from a wave into a Category 3 typhoon with winds of 115 mph (185 km/h). Interaction from the active Typhoon Gilda caused a Fujiwhara effect between the two and caused Ivy to weaken at a rapid pace from a Category 3 typhoon to a minimal tropical storm in 48 hours. The stronger Typhoon Gilda absorbed the weak Ivy on October 29 south of Iwo Jima.

Ivy never made landfall thus no damage or fatalities were reported.

=== Typhoon Jean ===
- Typhoon (JMA)
- Category 2-equivalent typhoon (SSHWS)
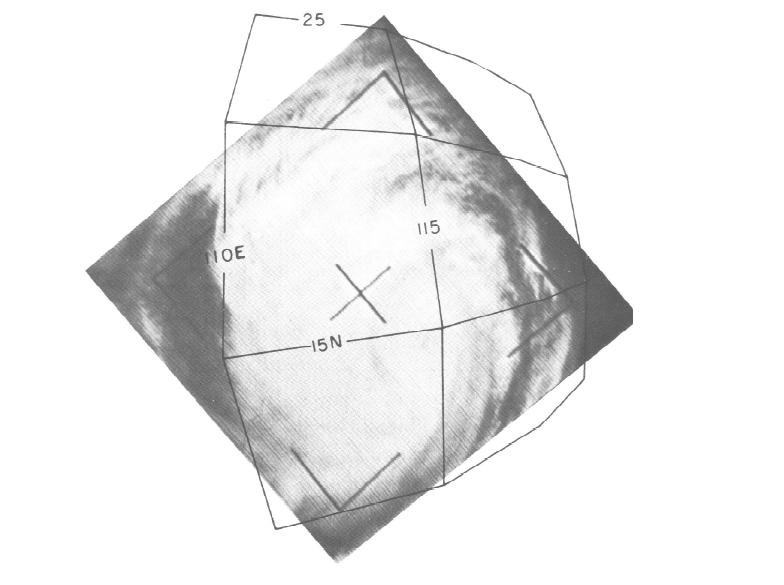
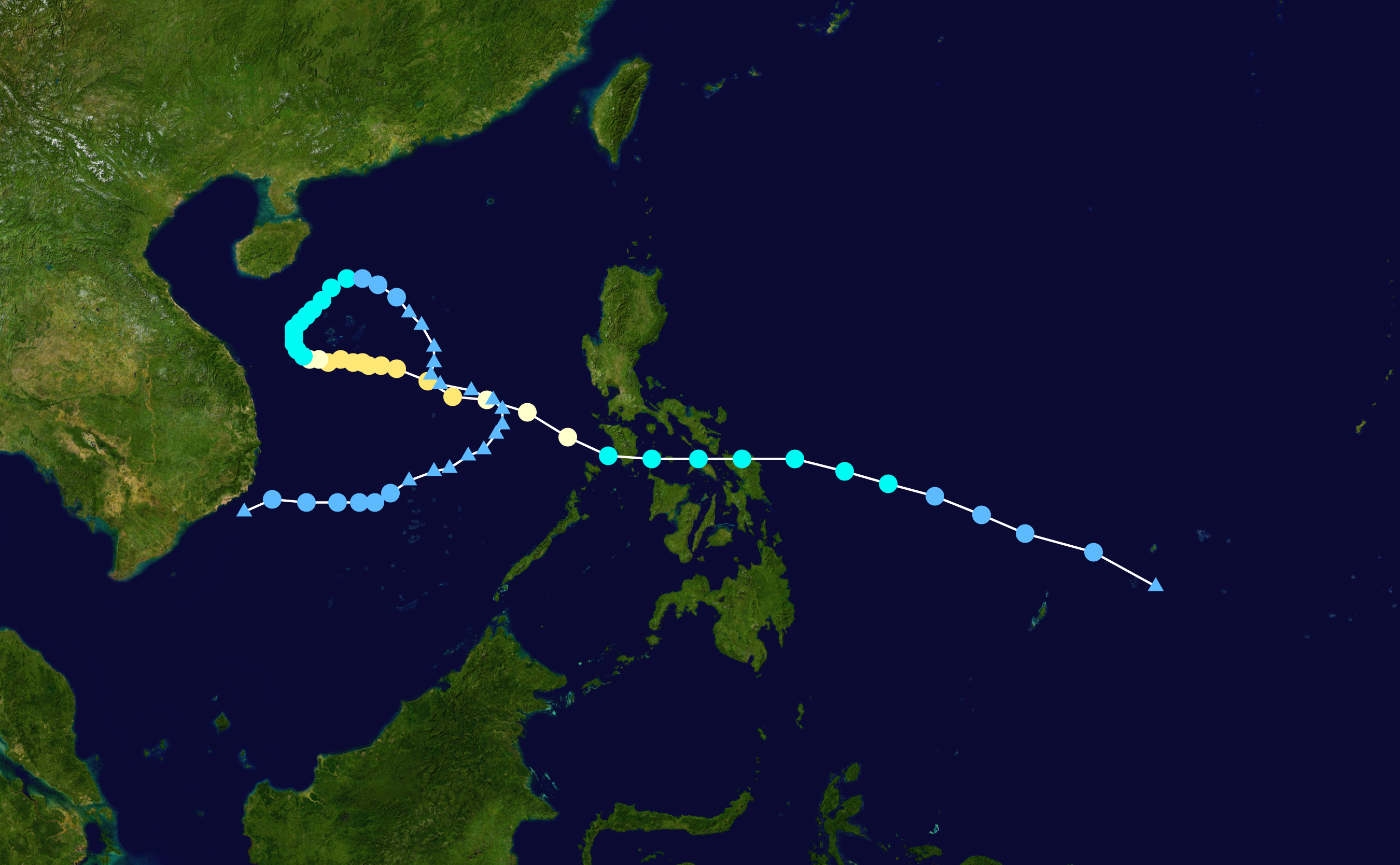
- Duration: November 4 – November 19
- Peak intensity: 165 km/h (105 mph) (1-min); 975 hPa (mbar)

An easterly tropical wave after the polar trough fractured the superposition formed on November 3 near Yap. The wave made landfall in the Philippines on the 6th and strengthened into Tropical Depression Eighty-One over land. Strengthening occurred and the depression became Tropical Storm Jean on the 6th near Manila. Rapid strengthening occurred and Jean peaked at a 100 mph (160 km/h) typhoon on November 9 near Vietnam. Jean started weakening and dissipated on November 13 because of lack of upper level divergence.

The Japan Meteorological Agency continued to track Jean for six more days. During that time, Jean made an anti-cyclonic loop to the south, where Jean was declared an extra-tropical low on November 19 in the open South China Sea. No damage or fatalities were reported.

=== Typhoon Karen ===
- Typhoon (JMA)
- Category 5-equivalent super typhoon (SSHWS)
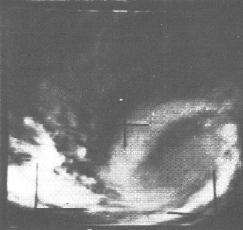
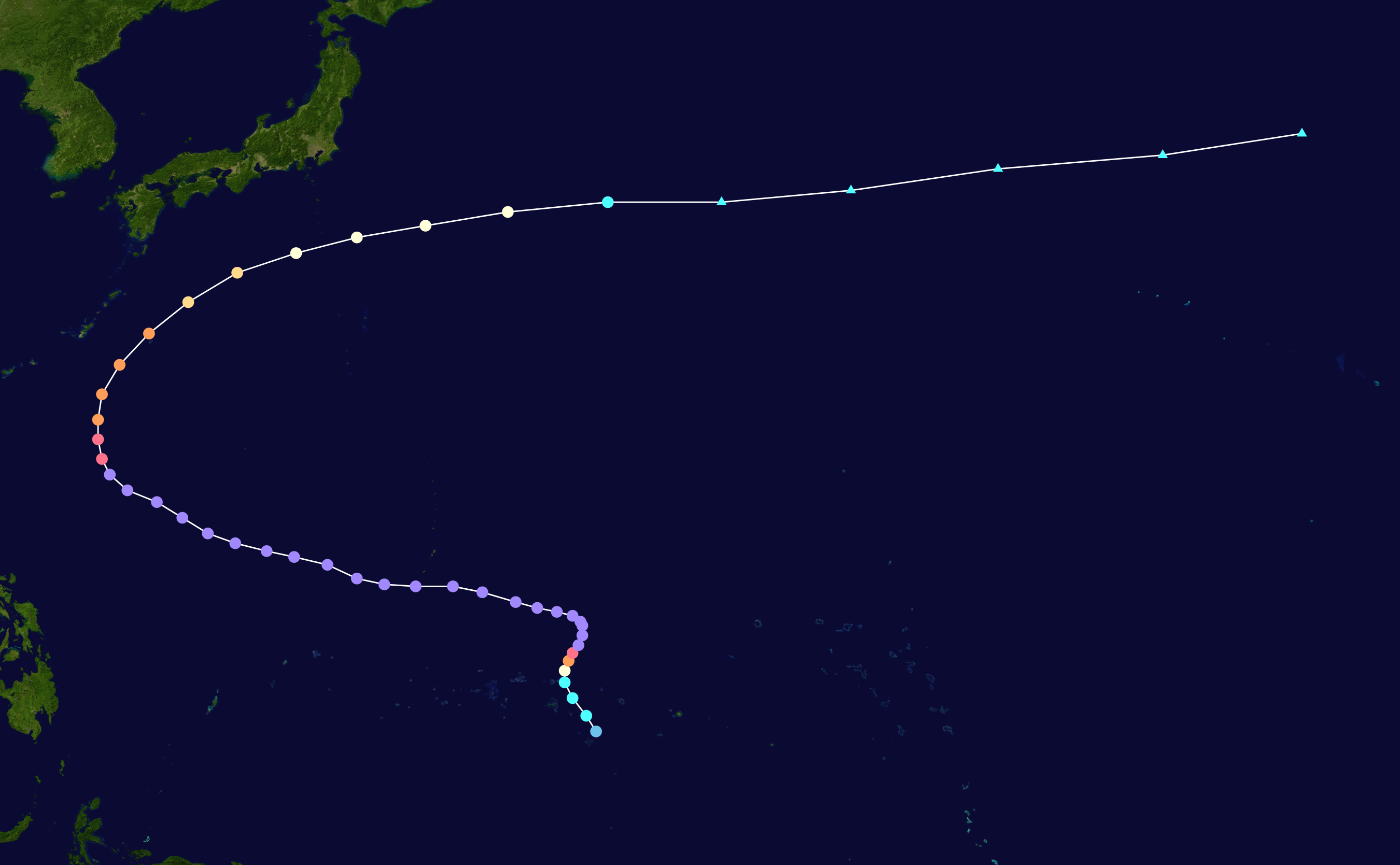
- Duration: November 7 – November 17
- Peak intensity: 295 km/h (185 mph) (1-min); 894 hPa (mbar)

Typhoon Karen, which formed on November 7 in the open Western Pacific, explosively intensified to a 185 mph (298 km/h) super typhoon on the 9th. It turned to the west, maintaining its powerful winds of 175–185 mph for 4 days as it crossed the islands of the West Pacific. Cool air weakened Karen as it turned to the north, and was only a minimal typhoon at its nearest approach to Japan. The storm turned eastward, where it became extratropical on November 18. Karen's strong winds caused $250 million in damage (1962 USD) and 11 casualties. Karen passed over the southern part of Guam in 1962. Wind gusts estimated near 185 mph (298 km/h) destroyed 95% of all homes on the island.

=== Typhoon Lucy ===
- Typhoon (JMA)
- Category 3-equivalent typhoon (SSHWS)
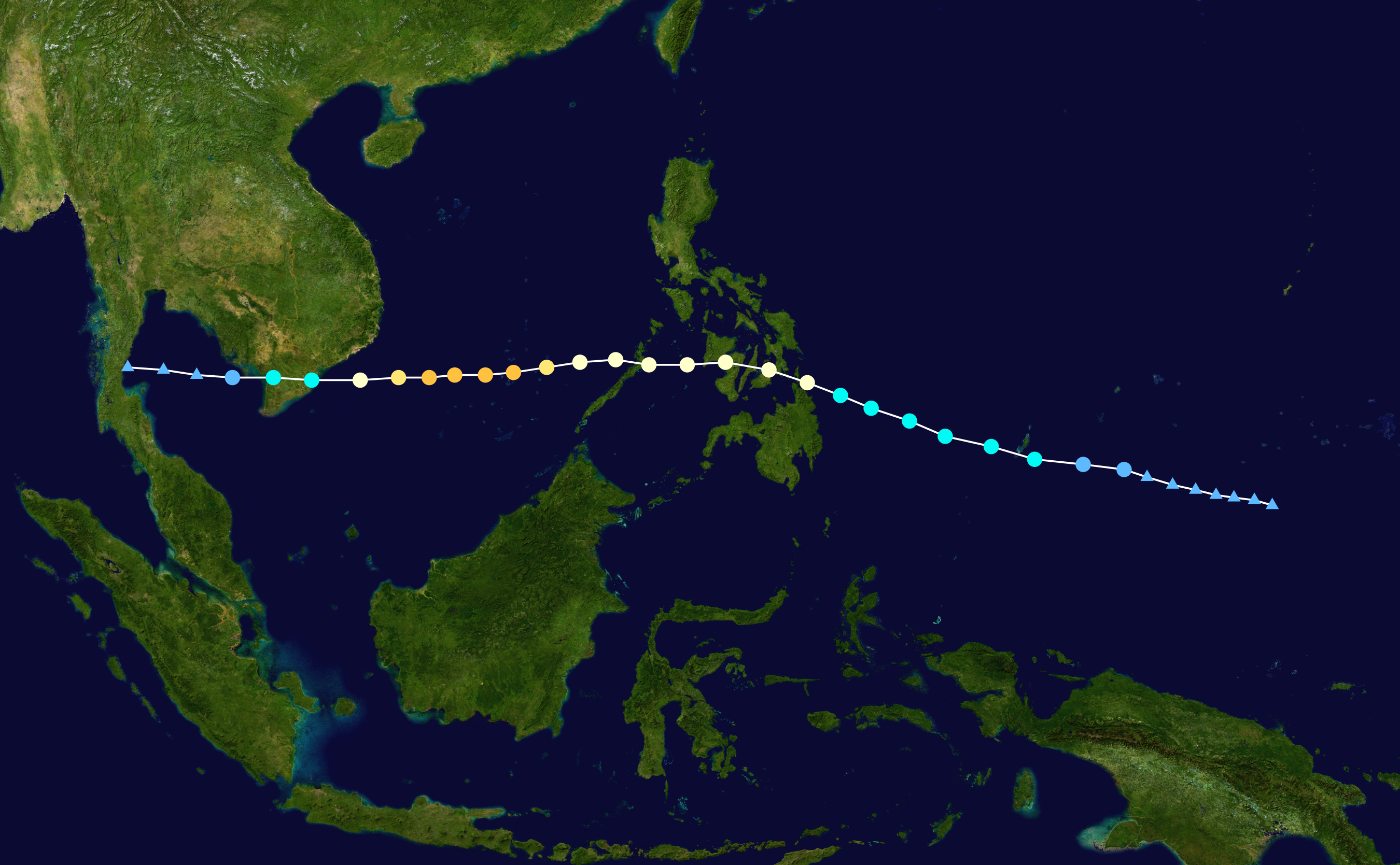
- Duration: November 23 – December 1
- Peak intensity: 185 km/h (115 mph) (1-min); 975 hPa (mbar)

A surge from the westerlies into MPT which was followed by cut-off low formed on November 24, while a depression formed downstream. This kind of formation is not unusual, both Typhoons Carla and Dinah formed in the same way. The system strengthened into Tropical Depression Eighty-Six near Koror on November 25 and strengthened into Tropical Storm Lucy on the same day. Strengthening occurred slowly, as Lucy did not gain typhoon status until November 27. That same day, Lucy made landfall in the Philippines as an 80 mph (130 km/h) typhoon. Lucy kept moving west and peaked at 115 mph (185 km/h), as a Category 3 typhoon on November 29. Lucy made landfall in the Philippines and southern South Vietnam on November 30. Lucy dissipated in the Strait of Taiwan on December 1 from cold air and land interaction. The Japan Meteorological Agency ceased advisories that same day.

Five people were killed, with $5 million (1962 USD ($37.4 million (2011 USD)). Winds of 60 mph (97 km/h) were felt at the Cebu City Airport when Lucy passed over the area.

=== Tropical Depression Mary ===
- Tropical depression (JMA)
- Tropical storm (SSHWS)
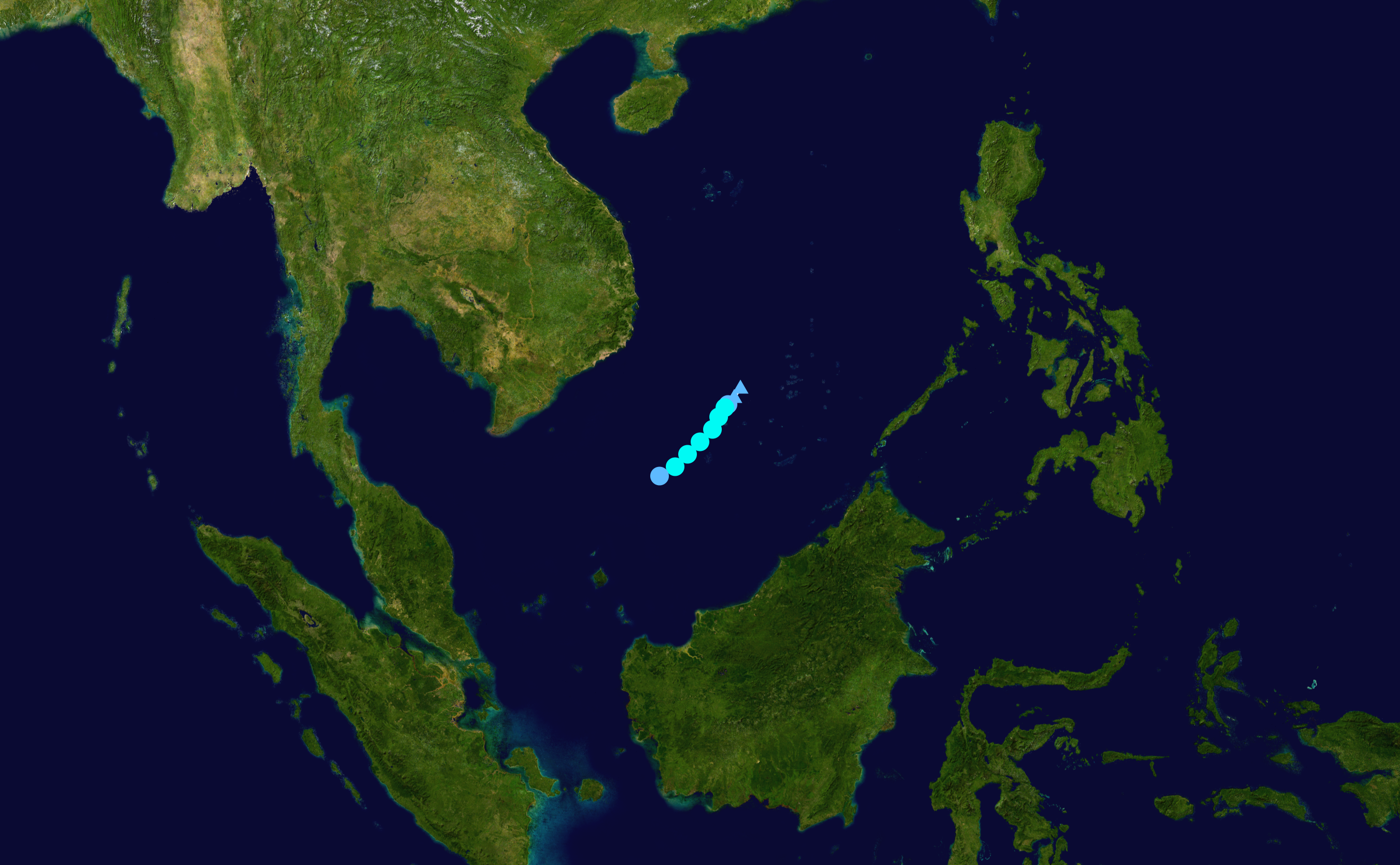
- Duration: December 1 – December 7
- Peak intensity: 85 km/h (50 mph) (1-min); 1006 hPa (mbar)

The eighty-ninth (and second-to-last) tropical wave of the season formed in the South China Sea, several hundred miles west of the Philippines. The wave was upgraded by the Joint Typhoon Warning Center as Tropical Storm Mary (instead of Tropical Depression Eighty-Nine) on December 1, following suit with the names used before. The depression was never followed by the Japan Meteorological Agency, however, the system was tracked by the Warning Center its entire time in the South China Sea. Mary went towards the southwest, peaking at winds of 55 mph (89 km/h) on December 2.

After that, the storm went on a slow weakening process, weakening to a minimal tropical storm on December 3. The next advisory, Mary was downgraded to a tropical depression, and the Joint Typhoon Warning Center ceased tracking the storm. Mary did not affect land in its entire lifetime.

=== Typhoon Nadine ===
- Typhoon (JMA)
- Tropical storm (SSHWS)
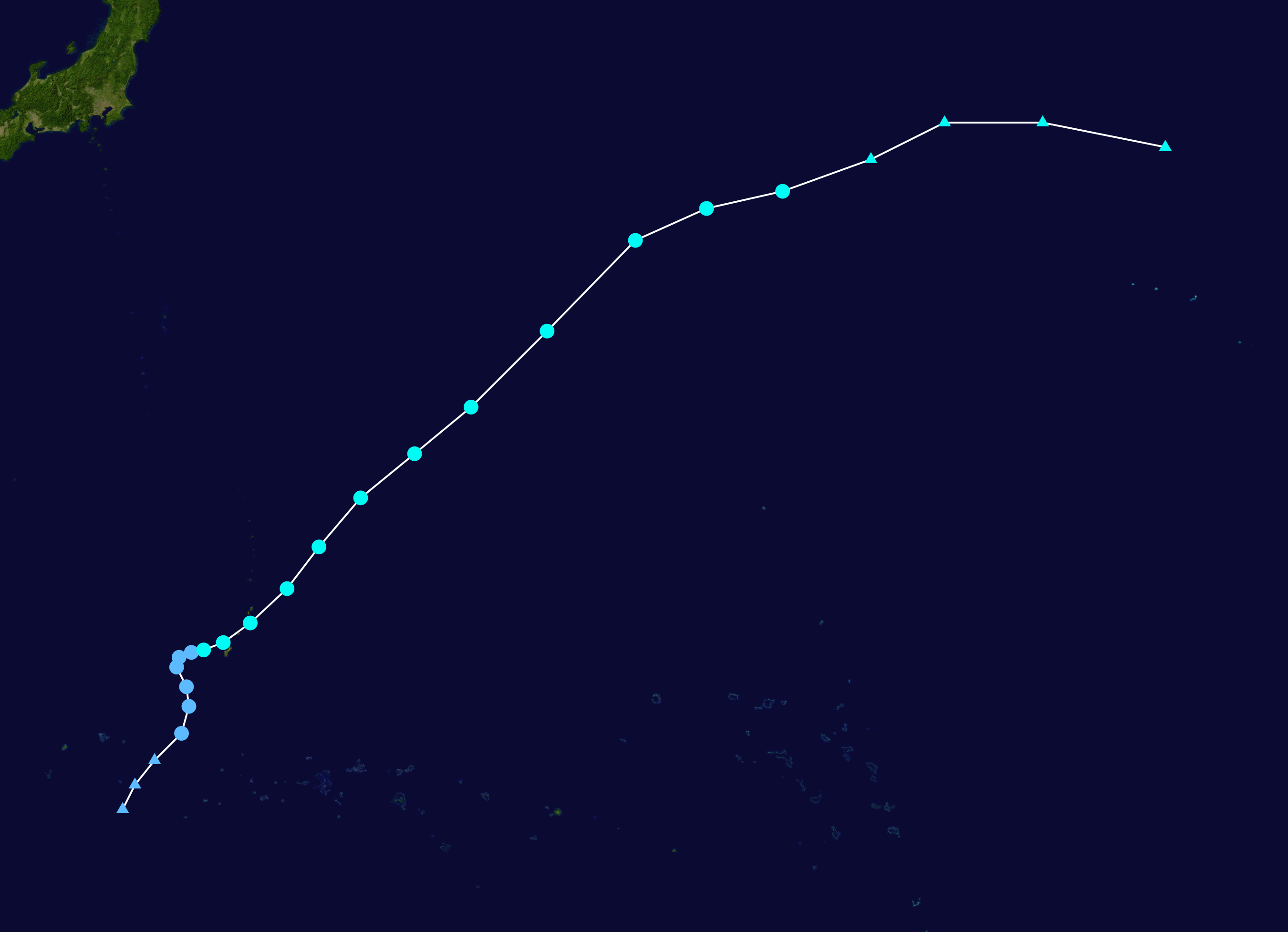
- Duration: December 5 – December 10
- Peak intensity: 95 km/h (60 mph) (1-min); 975 hPa (mbar)

An easterly wave, the ninetieth (and final) of the season, was first sighted on December 6 by the Joint Typhoon Warning Center several hundred miles southeast of Guam. The wave strengthened that day into Tropical Depression Ninety, appearing in the Japan Meteorological Agency's track data at that point. The depression curved to the northwest, striking the island Guam on December 7. Tropical Depression Ninety curved to the southeast of Saipan on December 8, strengthening into a tropical storm. Given the name Nadine by the Joint Typhoon Warning Center, it progressed northward, peaking at a minimal pressure of 974 millibars (28.76 inHg) and a wind speed of 60 mph (97 km/h) on December 10. Nadine began to approach the International Date Line (180°), but started an extratropical transition that same day.

Nadine was declared an extratropical storm on December 10, and the Joint Typhoon Warning Center ceased following the storm. However, the Japan Meteorological Agency continued tracking the storm. On December 11, just after passing the 170°E longitude line, Nadine was declared extratropical by the Japan Meteorological Agency. The extratropical remains of Nadine crossed the International Date Line and on the night of December 11, the Agency ceased following Nadine as it had crossed into the Central Pacific basin.

Although Nadine posed a threat to the island of Guam (which had been struck by Typhoon Karen less than a month before), there were no reports of fatalities, damage or strong winds.

== Storm names ==
In addition to the 30 named storms, an unnamed storm was tracked by the Japan Meteorological Agency, 6219, also known by the Joint Typhoon Warning Center as Tropical Depression Sixty-Six

- Agnes
- Bess
- Carmen
- Della
- Elaine
- Faye
- Gloria
- Hester
- Irma
- Judy
- Kit
- Lola
- Mamie
- Nina
- Ora
- Phyllis
- Rita
- Susan
- Tess
- Viola
- Winnie
- Alice
- Betty
- Cora
- Doris
- Elsie
- Flossie
- Grace
- Helen
- Ida
- June
- Kathy
- Lorna
- Marie
- Nancy
- Olga
- Pamela
- Ruby
- Sally
- Tilda
- Violet
- Wilda
- Anita
- Billie
- Clara
- Dot
- Ellen
- Fran
- Georgia
- Hope
- Iris
- Joan
- Kate
- Louise
- Marge
- Nora
- Opal
- Patsy
- Ruth
- Sarah
- Thelma
- Vera
- Wanda
- Amy
- Babe
- Carla
- Dinah
- Emma
- Freda
- Gilda
- Harriet
- Ivy
- Jean
- Karen
- Lucy
- Mary
- Nadine
- Olive
- Polly
- Rose
- Shirley
- Trix
- Virginia
- Wendy

=== Retirement ===
After the season JTWC announced that the name Karen will be retired and removed from the naming lists, being replaced with Kim.

== See also ==
- 1962 Pacific hurricane season
- 1962 Atlantic hurricane season
- 1962 North Indian Ocean cyclone season
- Australian region cyclone seasons: 1961–62 1962–63
- South Pacific cyclone seasons: 1961–62 1962–63
- South-West Indian Ocean cyclone seasons: 1961–62 1962–63
