= 1962 Atlantic hurricane season =

- Season summary map

Seasonal boundaries
- First system formed: June 30, 1962
- Last system dissipated: December 4, 1962

Strongest storm
- Name: Ella
  - Maximum winds: 110 mph (175 km/h) (1-minute sustained)
  - Lowest pressure: 958 mbar (hPa; 28.29 inHg)

Seasonal statistics
- Total depressions: 9
- Total storms: 7
- Hurricanes: 4
- Major hurricanes (Cat. 3+): 0
- Total fatalities: 39 overall
- Total damage: > $4.88 million (1962 USD)

Related articles
- 1962 Pacific hurricane season; 1962 Pacific typhoon season; 1962 North Indian Ocean cyclone season

The 1962 Atlantic hurricane season was the least active since 1946, with only seven named storms. The season officially began on June 15, while the first tropical storm developed on June 30. No further activity occurred until late August, when Hurricane Alma brushed the Outer Banks before becoming extratropical southeast of New England, destroying hundreds of boats and producing beneficial rainfall. Around that time, Tropical Storm Becky developed unusually far east in the Atlantic Ocean, becoming the easternmost storm on record to recurve to the northeast. Celia followed in the September, forming east of the Lesser Antilles and executing a loop near Bermuda before dissipating. Hurricane Daisy was the costliest of the season, leaving about $1.1 million in damage in New England (1962 USD). The storm dropped the highest rainfall total on record in Maine, and its precipitation caused 22 traffic fatalities. Ella, the strongest storm of the season, remained offshore of the eastern United States but caused two deaths. The final system, an unnamed hurricane, formed on November 28 and meandered erratically off the Southeastern United States before becoming extratropical on December 4.

In addition to the seven named storms, there were two non-developing tropical depressions. The first struck Texas in August, causing street flooding and killing three. The second formed off the west coast of Florida and flooded widespread areas after 1 in 100 year rainfall. The floods affected 5,000 houses and caused millions in damage. The season officially ended on November 15.

== Season activity ==
The hurricane season officially began on June 15, 1962. The National Hurricane Center began operations with no new equipment, and the warning agency instead opted to improve with the existing equipment. The agency had access to a system of radars that extended from Brownsville, Texas, to Eastport, Maine, which was set up in 1961. Although satellite imagery technology was available, the system was not fully active to provide daily images of Atlantic hurricanes. The season officially ended on November 15.

During the season, four hurricanes developed from seven named storms. This was below the average of 10 storms per season, and represented the fewest tropical storms since 1946. Four of the five storms developed from the Intertropical Convergence Zone. The decreased activity is partially due to the westerlies extending further south than usual, as well as a persistent ridge. In addition, temperatures in the eastern United States were cooler than usual. Activity through September 10 was the quietest in 30 years.

The only region of the United States threatened by hurricanes was New England, although no stations recorded hurricane-force winds in the country. This was the first such occurrence during the 20th century that no tropical storms or hurricanes hit the country. Overall damage was the lowest in several years.

== Systems ==
=== Tropical Storm One ===
- Tropical storm (SSHWS)
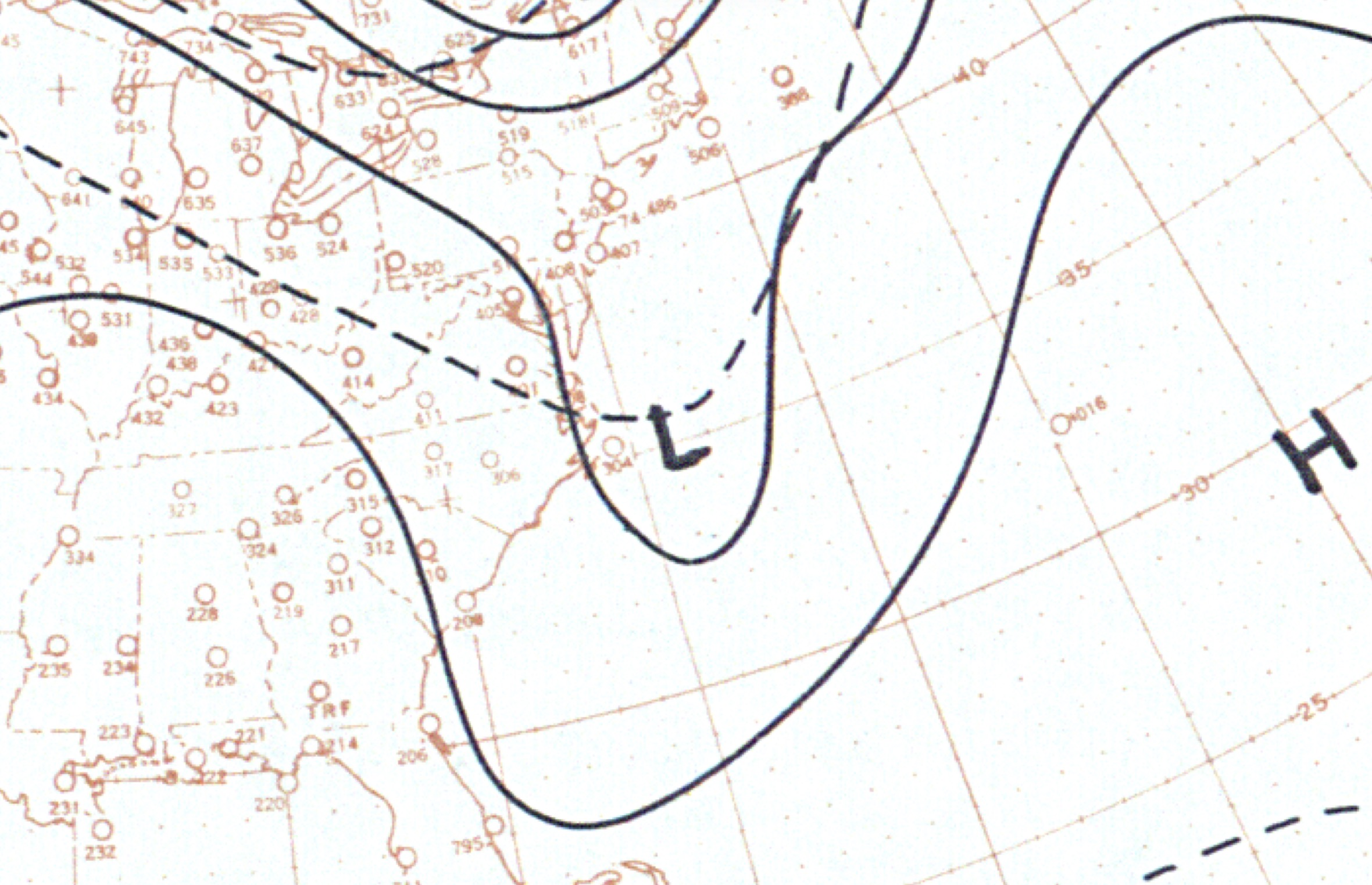
- Duration: June 30 – July 2
- Peak intensity: 65 mph (100 km/h) (1-min); 1000 mbar (hPa)

The first storm of the season originated from a cold front that stalled over the western Atlantic Ocean on June 28. A frontal low developed a day later off the coast of South Carolina. The low moved northward and northward, gradually acquiring tropical characteristics. The Atlantic hurricane reanalysis committee assessed that the system transitioned into a tropical storm by late on June 30, while moving over the Outer Banks of North Carolina. The storm at the time was co-located with an upper-level low, suggesting characteristics of a subtropical cyclone. Based on reports from ships and land stations, the maximum sustained winds were estimated at 65 mph (100 km/h). On July 1, an approaching cold front steered the storm away from the coast. The storm gradually weakened and transitioned back into an extratropical cyclone late on July 2. Turning to the north, the storm moved across Newfoundland, and curved to the west and southwest, striking New Brunswick and Nova Scotia. The storm turned back to the northeast, remaining offshore Nova Scotia until it was absorbed by an approaching extratropical storm on July 6.

While in its formative stages, the storm dropped torrential rainfall in coastal portions of North Carolina, causing locally heavy crop damage. Cedar Island reported 17 in (430 mm) of rainfall in an 18-hour period; at the time, it was the second-highest single-day rainfall total.

=== Hurricane Alma ===
- Category 1 hurricane (SSHWS)
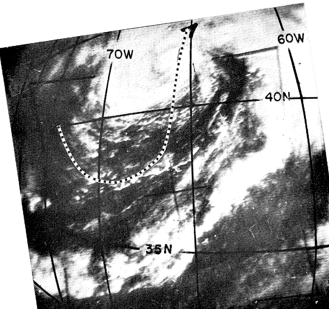
- Duration: August 26 – August 30
- Peak intensity: 85 mph (140 km/h) (1-min); 984 mbar (hPa)

A tropical wave developed into a tropical depression along the southeast Florida coast on August 26. It moved northward along the coast, located beneath an anticyclone that aided in its intensification. The depression began a motion to the northeast on August 27, and that day it strengthened into Tropical Storm Alma about 150 mi (240 km) east of the Florida/Georgia border. This marked the latest development of the first storm since 1941. Alma steadily intensified as it paralleled the coastline of the Carolinas, becoming a hurricane on August 28 a few miles off the coast of Cape Hatteras. Despite its proximity, the storm produced peak wind gusts of only 53 mph (85 km/h) in Nags Head. Wind gusts downed a power pole in Hatteras, which caused an hour long power outage for one-third of the town. There, the storm tide was 3 ft (0.91 m) above normal, which resulted in some erosion. The highest rainfall total from Alma in the United States was a report of 10.38 in (264 mm) in Cape Hatteras. Damage in the state amounted to $35,000.

After passing the Outer Banks, Alma continued to intensify further, reaching peak winds of 85 mph (140 km/h) about 85 mi (140 km) south of Nantucket. Despite its intensity, the hurricane never developed a well-defined eye. Alma quickly weakened to a tropical storm as it made its closest approach to New England, due to cooler water temperatures. In Rhode Island and Massachusetts along the coast, the storm produced northerly winds of 60 mph (97 km/h), and one house was damaged by a fallen tree. Tides reached 2 ft (0.61 m) above normal, which resulted in minor coastal flooding. However, Alma produced strong waves that destroyed over 100 boats. Damage from the storm was estimated at less than $1 million, though its rains were beneficial to drought-stricken areas of New England. Precipitation extended northward through Maine, and storm damage was reported as far north as Portsmouth, New Hampshire. Slick roads resulted in several traffic accidents, although there were no deaths. After moving by the region, Alma turned to the southeast due to a high-pressure system to its north. It became extratropical on August 30.

=== Tropical Storm Becky ===
- Tropical storm (SSHWS)
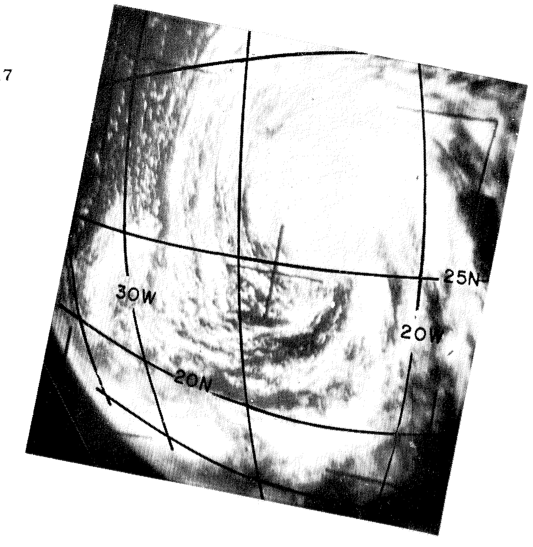
- Duration: August 27 – August 31
- Peak intensity: 60 mph (95 km/h) (1-min); 1005 mbar (hPa)

A tropical disturbance emerged from Africa in late August and developed into a weak tropical depression on August 27. For about 30 hours, the system affected the Cape Verde islands with rainfall, during which it moved slowly to the west and west-northwest. Late on August 28, it was estimated that the depression intensified into a tropical storm. The next day, satellite imagery observed a well-developed tropical cyclone in the far eastern Atlantic Ocean. In addition, a ship reported winds of force 9 on the Beaufort scale, suggesting winds of 50 mph (80 km/h). On that basis, the Weather Bureau initiated advisories on Tropical Storm Becky, despite the agency only issuing advisories for storms west of 35° W. Around that time, the storm moved over an area of anomalously warm water temperatures, which allowed for its intensification. On August 30, Becky turned to the north and northeast due to an approaching trough, becoming the easternmost cyclone since 1886 that a storm began a motion to the north. A hurricane hunters flight on August 31 indicated that Becky became extratropical about 70 mi (115 km) south of Santa Maria Island in the Azores. The storm's remnants continued to the northeast, dissipating on September 1 about 320 mi (515 km) west of Spain.

=== Tropical Storm Celia ===
- Tropical storm (SSHWS)
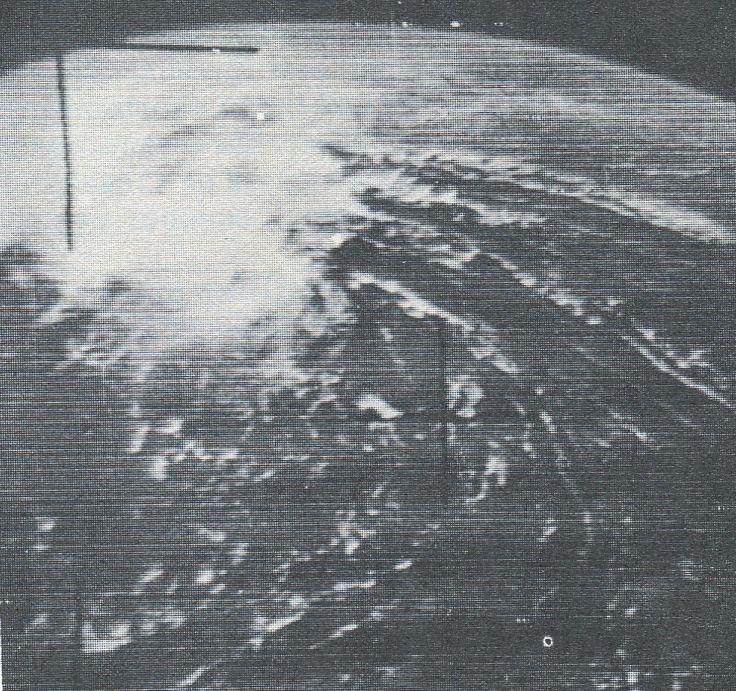
- Duration: September 12 – September 21
- Peak intensity: 70 mph (110 km/h) (1-min); 995 mbar (hPa)

A tropical wave developed into a tropical depression on September 12, about 1,000 mi (1,610 km) east of the Lesser Antilles. However, satellite imagery indicated that it could have become a tropical cyclone a day earlier. Late on September 12, a ship reported winds of 40 mph (64 km/h), which provided the basis for the San Juan Weather Bureau to initiate advisories on Tropical Storm Celia. The storm quickly attained peak winds of 70 mph (110 km/h), and on September 13 a hurricane watch was issued for the northern Leeward Islands. However, Celia passed beneath a mid- to upper-level trough and quickly weakened. By late on September 14, a hurricane hunters flight indicated that the storm's structure no longer resembled that of a tropical cyclone. The next day, Celia weakened to a tropical depression, and the Weather Bureau discontinued tropical cyclone advisories. It turned to the north and later to the east, passing well southeast of Bermuda. On September 18, Celia began executing a loop to the north, during which it re-intensified into a tropical storm, as reported by ships. It attained winds of 45 mph (70 km/h) on September 19, but again weakened to a tropical depression the next day. Celia became extratropical on September 21, without having affected land.

=== Hurricane Daisy ===
- Category 2 hurricane (SSHWS)
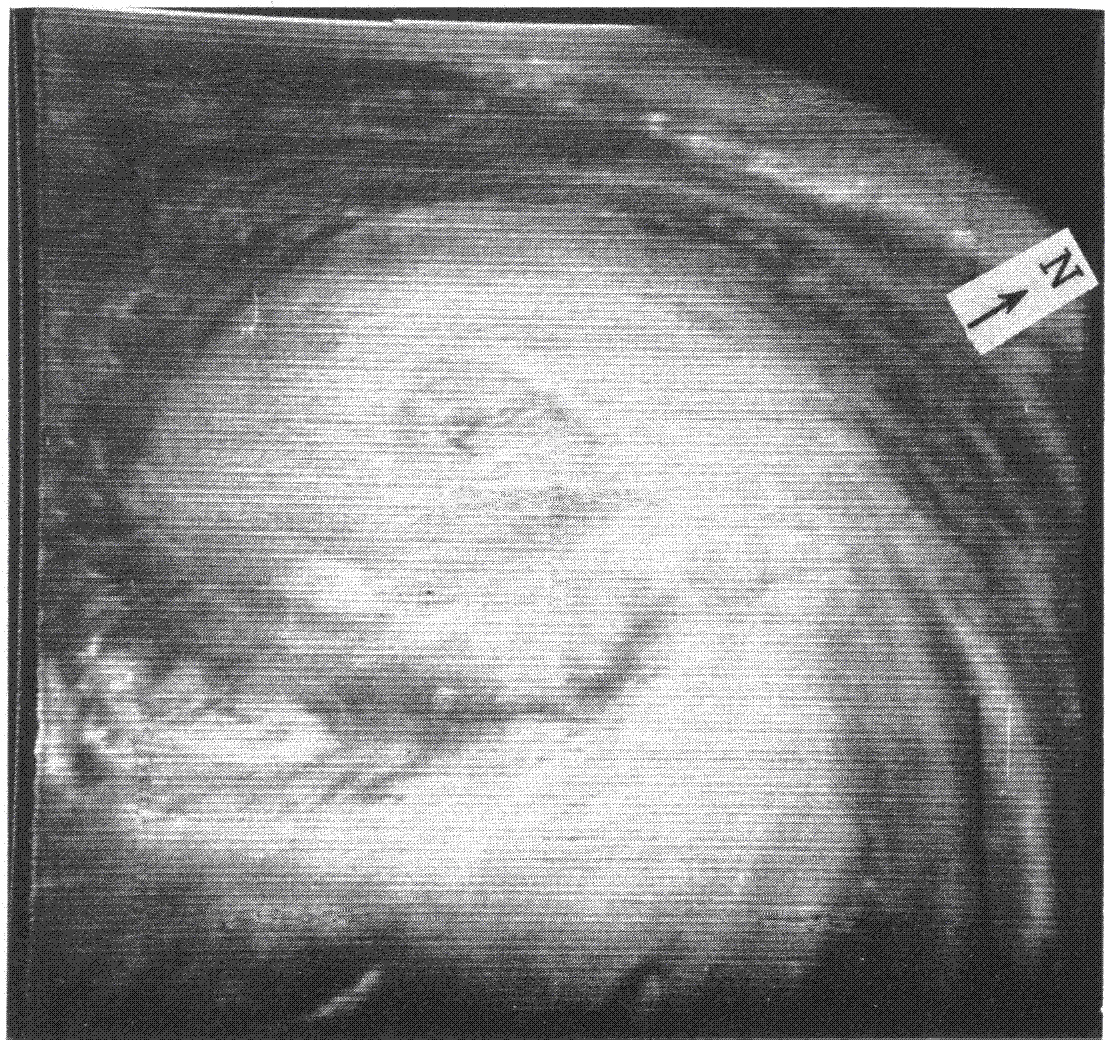
- Duration: September 29 – October 7
- Peak intensity: 105 mph (165 km/h) (1-min); 963 mbar (hPa)

On September 29, reconnaissance aircraft indicated the formation of a tropical depression to the east of the Lesser Antilles. For several days it moved to the west-northwest, passing just north of the islands without intensifying further. This was due to its presence beneath an upper-level trough, although the system began intensifying as the trough dissipated. On October 2, after turning to the northwest between two high-pressure areas, the depression strengthened into Tropical Storm Daisy. Developing an anticyclone aloft, the storm continued to gradually intensify, reaching hurricane strength on October 3. Two days later, Daisy turned to the north-northeast and attained peak winds of 105 mph (165 km/h). Cool air imparted weakening as Daisy turned northwestward, and on October 7, the storm transitioned into an extratropical about 185 mi (300 km) east of Chatham, Massachusetts. On the following day, the extratropical remnants of Daisy struck Nova Scotia just south of Yarmouth and later re-emerged into the Atlantic, before dissipating south of Newfoundland on October 9.

In New England, Hurricane Daisy's outer rainbands combined with an approaching nor'easter to drop torrential rainfall over the region for 65 hours, producing upwards of 12 in (300 mm) in portions of Massachusetts. The highest total from Daisy alone was 9.47 in (241 mm) at Portland International Jetport in Maine; this was the state's highest tropical cyclone rainfall total between 1950 and 2011. Across the region, the rains caused widespread flood damage. In Maine, wind gusts reaching 70 mph (110 km/h) destroyed hundreds of small boats, along with high waves from the storm. In New England, Daisy left five injuries, one direct death, and about $1.1 million in damage. Slick roads, however, resulted in 22 traffic fatalities. In Nova Scotia, winds gusted to 85 mph (137 km/h), which destroyed three boats and left two towns without power service. Rough seas killed six people in the province.

=== Hurricane Ella ===
- Category 2 hurricane (SSHWS)
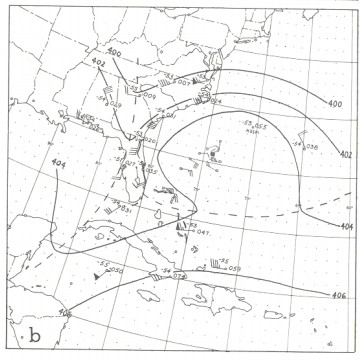
- Duration: October 14 – October 22
- Peak intensity: 110 mph (175 km/h) (1-min); 958 mbar (hPa)

In the middle of October, an area of disturbed weather persisted across the Turks and Caicos Islands, associated with an upper-level low. On October 14, a tropical depression developed and moved northward. A day after forming, it intensified into Tropical Storm Ella as it began a track to the northwest, located east of a weakening upper-level trough. On October 17, Ella strengthened further into a hurricane as an anticyclone was gradually developing. An approaching trough turned the hurricane to the east-northeast on October 19, and later that day Ella attained its peak intensity of 110 mph (175 km/h); that made it the strongest hurricane of the season. It gradually weakened over cooler waters while accelerating to the northeast, and its eye grew to an unusually large diameter of 100 mi (160 km). Ella became extratropical on October 22 over the northern Atlantic as it interacted with an approaching cold front. Shortly thereafter its remnants moved over Newfoundland before dissipating on October 23.

Ella is historically notable for its role in the Cuban Missile Crisis. The storm greatly complicated naval operations relating to the 'quarantine' blockade of Cuba and badly damaged several Soviet nuclear-armed submarines en route to the island, contributing to the escalation of the B-59 Incident. Nevertheless, the Americans also took advantage of the storm to provide a pretext for cancelling previously-announced exercises before the public disclosure of the Crisis. These included a Tactical Air Command exercise on the 19th of October, and a major amphibious exercise, PHIBRIGLEX-62, near Puerto Rico the following day.

Early in its duration, Hurricane Ella briefly threatened to strike the North Carolina coastline. Although it remained offshore, the hurricane produced significant beach erosion along the coast. There were two associated deaths from a missing motor boat that left Charleston, South Carolina. The crew of two was declared deceased after a Coast Guard, Navy, and Air Force search failed to locate their bodies. There was no damage in Canada from its remnants.

=== Hurricane Ten ===
- Category 1 hurricane (SSHWS)
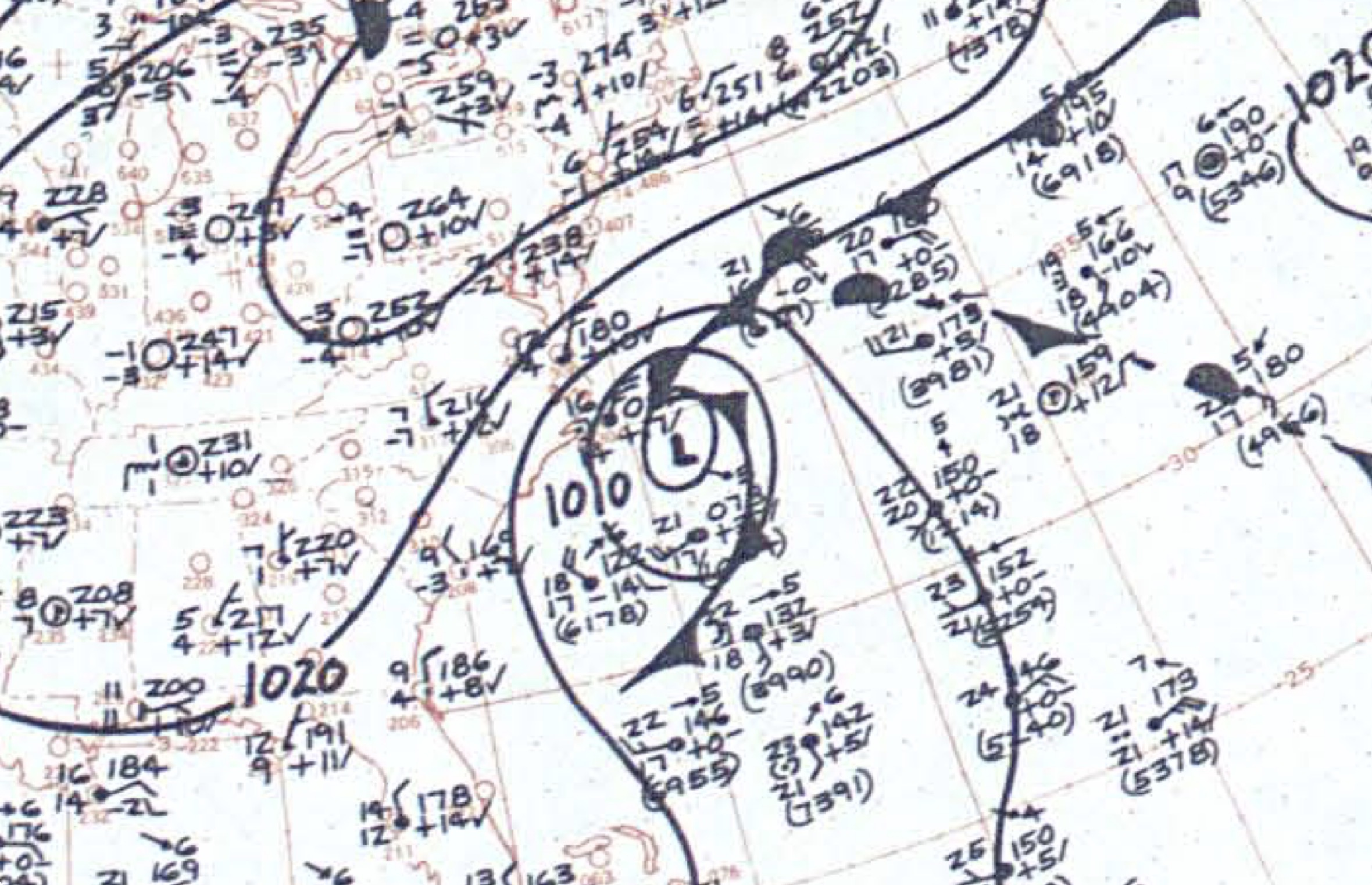
- Duration: November 28 – December 4
- Peak intensity: 90 mph (150 km/h) (1-min); 988 mbar (hPa)

On November 25, a cold front was stalled over the western Atlantic Ocean. A day later, an extratropical storm producing hurricane-force winds developed about 200 mi (320 km) south-southeast of Cape Hatteras, North Carolina. The storm remained nearly stationary for several days near the coast, drifting westward and later to the south. On November 27, the storm's wind structure became more symmetric, with an inner core developing inside the larger extratropical low. Based on ship reports near the center, the system transitioned into a hurricane early on November 28; due to its interaction with the extratropical storm, the system was potentially a subtropical cyclone, although the lack of satellite imagery prevented such a classification. By later on November 28, the hurricane weakened to a tropical storm, affected by wind shear. By that point, the storm had turned to the east, followed by a turn to the northwest and later west-southwest on the next day. Late on November 30, satellite imagery indicated an eye-like feature in the center of the storm. A day later, the storm re-intensified into a hurricane, reaching its peak intensity of 90 mph (150 km/h). On December 2, the hurricane turned back to the southwest as it made its closest approach to the Outer Banks. Stronger wind shear caused the hurricane to weaken to a tropical storm again on December 3, as an approaching cold front steered the storm northeastward. Two days later, the storm transitioned back into an extratropical storm to the east of the Outer Banks, briefly regaining hurricane intensity on December 5. A day later, a larger extratropical storm over the northeastern United States absorbed the former hurricane.

For several days, the storm meandered off the southeast coast of the United States, producing high tides and beach erosion from Florida to Virginia; many of these areas were affected by a severe nor'easter in March 1962. The storm's interaction with a ridge to its northeast produced a strong pressure gradient, resulting in gale-force winds across the Virginia and North Carolina coast. In Virginia, a dredge involved in the construction of the Chesapeake Bay Bridge–Tunnel broke loose and rain aground. During the storm's formative stages, it produced wind gusts of 89 mph (143 km/h) on Oak Island, North Carolina. High waves washed away dunes, wrecked coastal houses, and sank several boats, including a ferry. The storm washed out a temporary bridge and deepened a temporary inlet on Hatteras Island north of Buxton, both the aftermath of the March 1962 storm. As a tropical cyclone, the hurricane produced tropical storm force winds along the North Carolina coast. Rainfall associated with the storm was generally light, except for portions of the Outer Banks and in Georgia.

=== Other systems ===
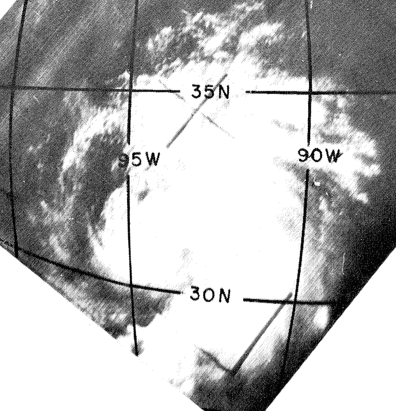
Tropical depression after it moved ashore on August 29

On August 26, a tropical depression formed in the western Gulf of Mexico about 280 mi (450 km) northeast of Tampico, Tamaulipas. It moved slowly to the north-northwest around a ridge without intensifying beyond winds of 30 mph (45 km/h). The system encountered wind shear throughout its duration, which displaced the convection from the center to its northeast. The depression struck just west of the Texas/Louisiana border on August 29 before dissipating on August 30. Rainfall in Texas was minimal, estimated around 1 in (25 mm). However, heavy amounts of precipitation fell across Louisiana, peaking at 23.13 in (588 mm) near Hackberry. Rainfall extended northeastward through Arkansas and Missouri. On August 29 as the depression moved ashore, heavy rainfall caused street flooding in Cameron, Louisiana. Two tornadoes were reported in the town, one of which produced winds of 80 mph (130 km/h). The storms damaged 115 houses or trailers, of which one was destroyed. There were 30 people injured, of whom 18 required hospital attention, and there were three deaths.

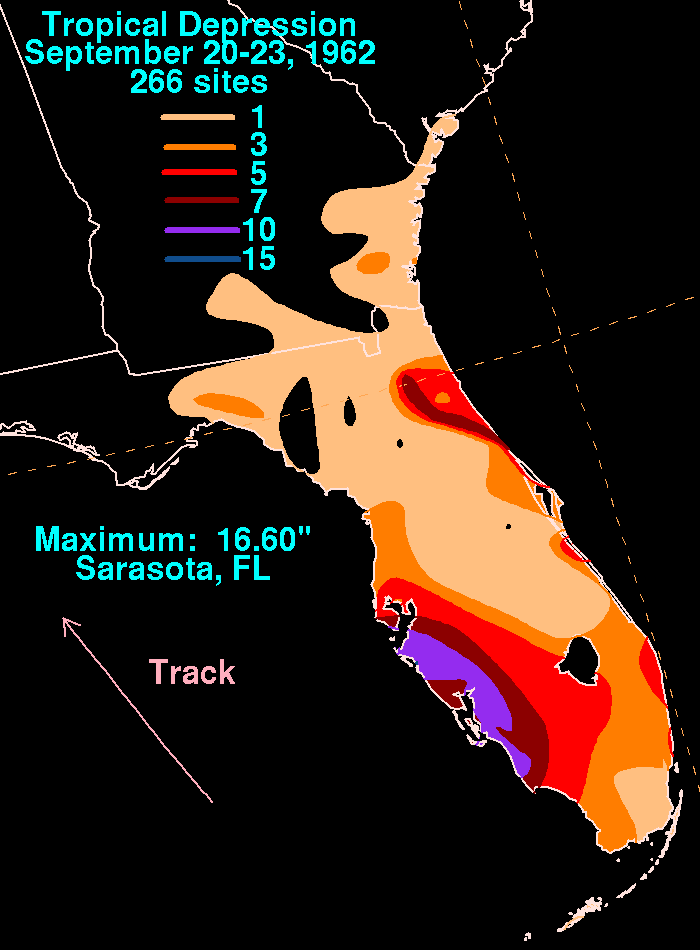
Tropical depression total rainfall map, September 20–23

An upper-level low spawned a tropical depression off the west coast of Florida on September 20. The depression moved very slowly to the north-northwest, which produced heavy rainfall from Naples to Tampa, Florida. The highest total was 16.60 in (422 mm) in Sarasota, although precipitation of over 1 in (25 mm) extended into Georgia and extreme southern South Carolina. A developing cyclone off the Carolinas caused the dissipation of the depression on September 23. The rains resulted in 3 ft (0.91 m) of floodwaters across western Florida, and both the Manatee River and the Phillippi Creek experienced record crests. The flooding entered over 5,000 houses, which forced the evacuation of more than 100 families. The floods also caused schools to close in three counties. In addition, floodwaters affected thousands of acres of farmlands in six counties, and some did not dry out for several weeks. Wind gusts reached 58 mph (93 km/h) in eastern Florida, and more than 20,000 people were left without power. There was one death in the state related to the storm, and damage was estimated at $2.78 million.

== Storm names ==
The following list of names was used for named storms (tropical storms and hurricanes) that formed in the North Atlantic in 1962. A storm was named Celia for the first time this season.

- Alma
- Becky
- Celia
- Daisy
- Ella
- Flossie (unused)
- Greta (unused)
- Hallie (unused)
- Inez (unused)
- Judith (unused)
- Kendra (unused)
- Lois (unused)
- Marsha (unused)
- Noreen (unused)
- Orpha (unused)
- Patty (unused)
- Rena (unused)
- Sherry (unused)
- Thora (unused)
- Vicky (unused)
- Wilna (unused)

== Season effects ==
This is a table of all of the storms that formed in the 1962 Atlantic hurricane season. It includes their name, duration, peak classification and intensities, areas affected, damage, and death totals. Deaths in parentheses are additional and indirect (an example of an indirect death would be a traffic accident), but were still related to that storm. Damage and deaths include totals while the storm was extratropical, a wave, or a low, and all of the damage figures are in 1962 USD.

Saffir–Simpson scale
TD	TS	C1	C2	C3	C4	C5

1962 Atlantic hurricane season statistics
Storm name	Dates active	Storm category at peak intensity	Max 1-min wind mph (km/h)	Min. press. (mbar)	Areas affected	Damage (US$)	Deaths	Ref(s).
Unnamed	June 30 – July 2	Tropical storm	60 (95)	1000	North Carolina, Atlantic Canada	None	None	
Alma	August 26–30	Category 1 hurricane	85 (140)	984	Puerto Rico, Greater Antilles, The Bahamas, East Coast of the United States	$1 million	0 (1)	
Depression	August 26–30	Tropical depression	30 (45)	1005	Texas, Louisiana, Oklahoma, Arkansas, Missouri	Unknown	3	
Becky	August 27–31	Tropical storm	60 (95)	1005	West Africa, Cape Verde, Azores	None	None	
Celia	September 12–21	Tropical storm	70 (110)	995	None	None	None	
Depression	September 20–23	Tropical depression	30 (45)	1010	Florida, Georgia, South Carolina	$2.78 million	1	
Daisy	September 29 – October 7	Category 2 hurricane	105 (165)	963	Leeward Islands, Bermuda, New England, Atlantic Canada	>$1.1 million	8 (24)	
Ella	October 14–22	Category 2 hurricane	110 (175)	958	Cuba, East Coast of the United States, Atlantic Canada	Unknown	2	
Unnamed	November 28 – December 4	Category 1 hurricane	90 (150)	988	East Coast of the United States	Unknown	None	
Season aggregates
9 systems	June 30 – December 4		110 (175)	958		>$4.88 million	14 (25)	

== See also ==
- 1962 Pacific hurricane season
- 1962 Pacific typhoon season
- Australian region cyclone seasons: 1961–62 1962–63
- South Pacific cyclone seasons: 1961–62 1962–63
- South-West Indian Ocean cyclone seasons: 1961–62 1962–63
