= Hurricane Alma (1962) =

Category 1 Atlantic hurricane in 1962

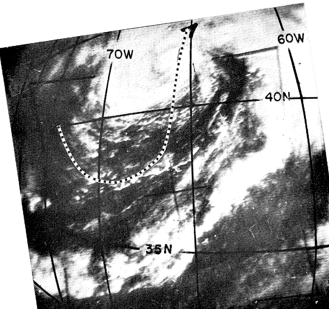
- TIROS V image of Alma from August 29, 1962 at 1431z

Meteorological history
- Formed: August 26, 1962
- Dissipated: August 30, 1962

Category 1 hurricane
- 1-minute sustained (SSHWS/NWS)
- Highest winds: 85 mph (140 km/h)
- Lowest pressure: 984 mbar (hPa); 29.06 inHg

Overall effects
- Fatalities: 1 indirect
- Damage: $1 million (1962 USD)
- Areas affected: Puerto Rico, East Coast of the United States
- IBTrACS
- Part of the 1962 Atlantic hurricane season

Hurricane Alma impacted much of the East Coast of the United States in late August 1962. The second tropical storm of the season, Alma formed from a tropical wave located offshore South Florida on August 26. Initially a tropical depression, it subsequently moved inland over South Florida. Impact in the state was minor, generally limited to light rainfall and rough seas. Early on August 27, the depression reemerged into the Atlantic Ocean and strengthened into Tropical Storm Alma later that day. Thereafter, it moved northeastward and remained offshore the East Coast of the United States. Alma strengthened into a hurricane on August 28, while located offshore the Outer Banks of North Carolina. In the eastern portion of the state, strong winds downed electrical poles, which caused power outages. Storm tides caused erosion in some areas. Damage in North Carolina reached $35,000 (1962 USD).

The storm continued to intensify and peaked as an 85 mph (137 km/h) Category 1 hurricane on the Saffir–Simpson hurricane wind scale on August 28. The storm's outer bands brought rainfall, rough seas, and strong winds, especially in Massachusetts. However, the precipitation was mostly beneficial, as New England was suffering from drought conditions. In Massachusetts, strong winds caused power and telephone outages, and felled numerous trees. Rough seas offshore Massachusetts destroyed over 100 boats. Losses in New England were less than $1 million. Alma curved eastward and weakened to a tropical storm in the northwestern Atlantic on August 30. Several hours later, the storm transitioned into an extratropical cyclone while situated south of Nova Scotia.

== Meteorological history ==
Map plotting the storm's track and intensity, according to the Saffir–Simpson scale Map key Saffir–Simpson scale Tropical depression (≤38 mph, ≤62 km/h) Tropical storm (39–73 mph, 63–118 km/h) Category 1 (74–95 mph, 119–153 km/h) Category 2 (96–110 mph, 154–177 km/h) Category 3 (111–129 mph, 178–208 km/h) Category 4 (130–156 mph, 209–251 km/h) Category 5 (≥157 mph, ≥252 km/h) Unknown Storm type Tropical cyclone Subtropical cyclone Extratropical cyclone, remnant low, tropical disturbance, or monsoon depression

A weak circulation, associated with a tropical wave, was first observed by Television Infrared Observation Satellite (TIROS) in the eastern Atlantic Ocean on August 14. The system tracked westward and was observed by a research flight on August 18. Four days later, the system entered the Caribbean Sea and continued to remain disorganized. The wave moved across eastern Cuba on August 24, before emerging into the Straits of Florida on the following day. The system finally began to organize, and at 1200 UTC on August 26, a tropical depression developed offshore southeastern Florida coast. Shortly thereafter, the depression made landfall near Boca Raton, Florida with winds of 30 mph (48 km/h). It traveled barely inland and emerged into the Atlantic Ocean near Fort Pierce early on August 27. The depression moved northeastward and strengthened due to its location beneath an anticyclone. Later on August 27, the depression was upgraded to Tropical Storm Alma while situated about 150 mi (240 km) east of the Florida–Georgia border.

Alma steadily intensified as it paralleled the coastline of The Carolinas, becoming a hurricane on August 28 a few miles off the coast of Cape Hatteras, North Carolina. Around that time, Alma attained its minimum barometric pressure of 984 mbar (29.1 inHg). At 1800 UTC on August 28, Alma attained its maximum sustained wind speed of 85 mph (137 km/h). A high pressure system over Atlantic Canada caused Alma to turn east-southeastward, while weakening to a tropical storm on August 30. Later that day, the storm transitioned into an extratropical cyclone while situated about 180 miles (290 km) south-southeast of the southwestern tip of Nova Scotia. The high pressure system also caused the extratropical remnants to execute a cyclonic loop between August 31 and September 2. Later that day, the extratropical remnants of Alma curved northeastward, before dissipating south of Newfoundland.

== Preparations and impact ==
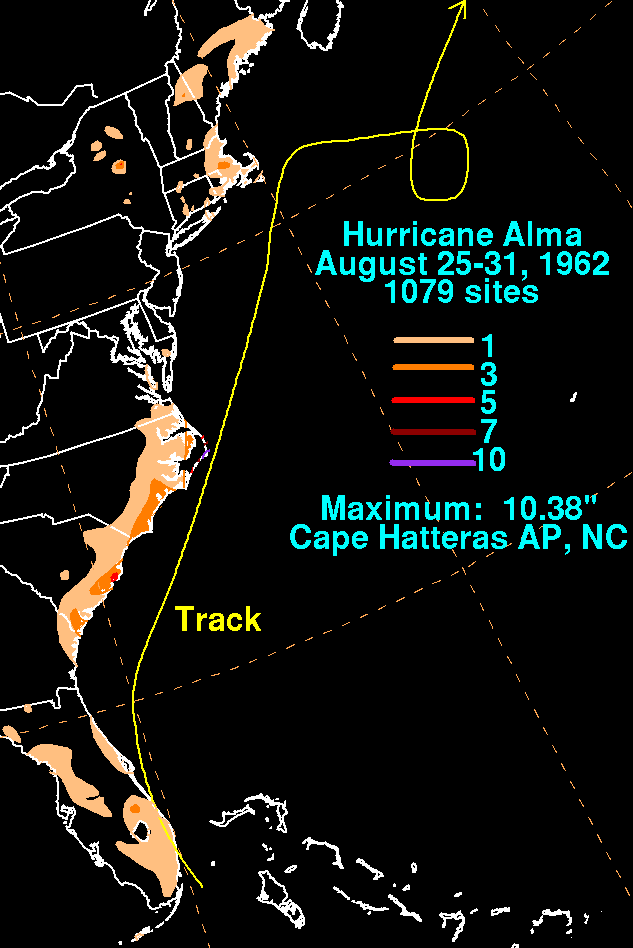
Rainfall from Hurricane Alma along the East Coast of the United States

In Puerto Rico, heavy rainfall associated with the precursor tropical wave produced flooding in the southeastern portion of the island. On August 25, a day before Alma developed, the precursor system brought high seas to the Atlantic coasts of Florida and Georgia; this resulted in small craft warnings from Daytona Beach, Florida to Savannah, Georgia. Additionally, the storm brought light precipitation to some areas of both states. As the storm traveled parallel to the East Coast of the United States, smalls crafts were also advised to remain in port between Edisto Island and the mouth of the Little River in South Carolina. Along the coast of that state, Alma brought gusty winds and heavy to excessive precipitation in some area, though no damage was reported.

Despite its proximity to land, the storm produced peak wind gusts of only 53 mph (85 km/h) in Nags Head. Wind gusts downed a power pole in Hatteras, which caused an hour long power outage for one-third of the town. There, the storm tide was 3 ft (0.91 m) above normal, which resulted in some erosion. The highest rainfall total from Alma in the United States was a report of 10.38 in (264 mm) in Cape Hatteras. Damage in the state amounted to $35,000. The eye of Alma passed about 70 miles (110 km) south-southeast of the Virginia Capes, and brought light precipitation, gusty winds, and rough surf to the eastern portion of the state. Rainfall peaked at only 0.64 inches (16 mm) in Norfolk, causing no flooding. Minor beach erosion occurred due to tides 1.3 feet (0.40 m) above normal at Hampton Roads. No significant wind damage occurred, as the strongest sustained wind speed in the area was 36 mph (58 km/h) in Cape Henry.

In Massachusetts, the outer bands of Alma brought 40 hours of nearly continuous rainfall, as well as gale-force winds for several hours. Precipitation amounts reached up to 3 inches (76 mm), though it was mostly beneficial, as the region of New England was suffering from drought conditions. Slick roads resulted in several traffic accidents. Tides reached 2 ft (0.61 m) above normal in the state of Massachusetts, which resulted in minor coastal flooding. However, Alma produced strong waves that destroyed over 100 boats. Additionally, many cabin cruisers and smaller vessels broke loose from their moorings and smashed against the rocks. The storm produced northerly wind gust up to 51 mph (82 km/h) to the Boston area, in addition to winds of 60 mph (97 km/h) along coastal sections of the state. As a result, many trees fell, causing power and telephone outages, and smashing a house and parked car in Lynn. At the Civil Defense facility in Melrose, winds and rainfall short-circuited the sirens, causing them to wail for more than 2 hours. At the Fair Grounds in Topsfield, a large tent was blown down. One indirect death occurred when a woman was struck by a truck that skidded off the road in Haverhill.

Elsewhere in New England, the storm brought rainfall and 60 mph (97 km/h) winds to coastal Rhode Island. Storm damage was reported as far north as Portsmouth, New Hampshire, while precipitation extended northward into Maine. Damage from the storm in New England was estimated at less than $1 million.

== See also ==
- Hurricane Esther (1961)
- Hurricane Gerda (1969)
- Hurricane Arthur (2014)
- Hurricane Alex (2004)
