= 1962 Pacific hurricane season =

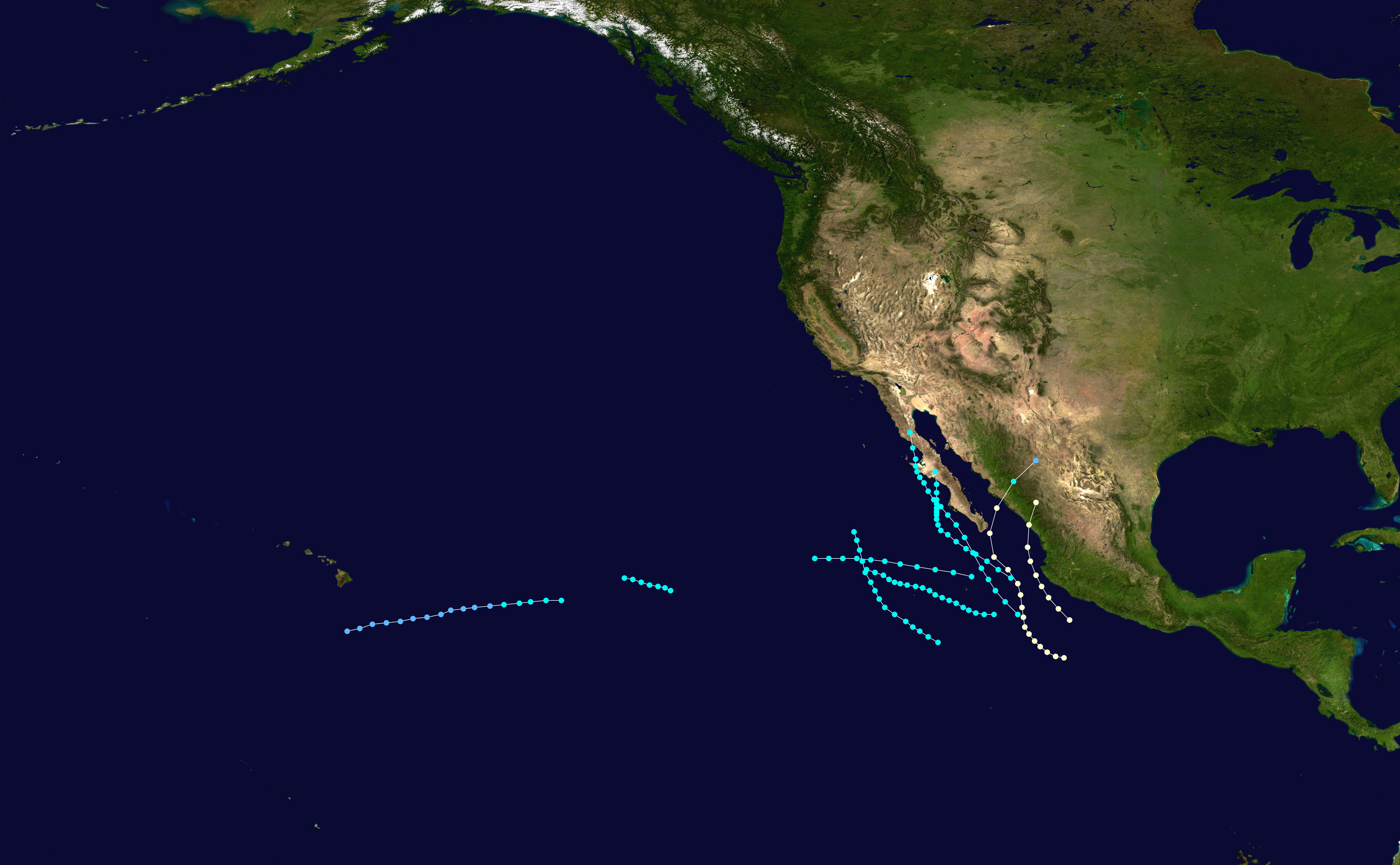
- Season summary map

Seasonal boundaries
- First system formed: June 24, 1962
- Last system dissipated: October 5, 1962

Strongest storm
- Name: Doreen
  - Maximum winds: 85 mph (140 km/h) (1-minute sustained)

Seasonal statistics
- Total depressions: 18
- Total storms: 16
- Hurricanes: 2
- Total fatalities: Unknown
- Total damage: $11 million (1962 USD)

Related articles
- 1962 Atlantic hurricane season; 1962 Pacific typhoon season; 1962 North Indian Ocean cyclone season

The 1962 Pacific hurricane season was a moderately active Pacific hurricane season that included two hurricane landfalls. The 1962 Pacific hurricane season officially started on May 15, 1962 in the eastern Pacific and June 1, 1962 in the Central Pacific Hurricane Center's area of responsibility and lasted until November 30, 1962 in both regions. These dates conventionally delimit the period of each year when most tropical cyclones form in the northeastern Pacific Ocean.

The first of two hurricane landfalls, Hurricane Valerie, struck northwestern Mexico in June. The other, Hurricane Doreen, hit further to the north of Valerie in October. The most impacting storm of the season was Tropical Storm Claudia, after its remnants dropped heavy rainfall in portions of Arizona. The rainfall left damaging flooding across rivers and towns. No people were killed, but damage totaled to $11 million (1962 USD). Moreover, Tropical Storm Bernie also made landfall along the Baja California peninsula, later providing rain to Arizona. An unusually high number of storms threatened the Palmyra Atoll, where only 1% of known Pacific tropical cyclones have threatened. In all, a total of 16 storms were observed, which was above average though only two (Valerie and Doreen) reached hurricane intensity.

== Seasonal summary ==
With 16 named storms, the season was above the 1949-2006 average of 13 named storms and was the most active season ever recorded at that time; however, this record was broken in the 1968 Pacific hurricane season, which saw 18 storms. Despite the activity, only two hurricanes were observed and no major hurricanes (Category 3 or higher on the Saffir-Simpson Hurricane Wind Scale) were noted. These totals are well below their long-term averages of seven and three respectively. This season was part of a decade-long absence of major hurricanes; during the 1960s, only one major hurricane was observed and none were noted from 1960 to 1966. However, it is possible that some storms were missed due to the lack of satellite coverage in the region; at that time, satellite data was still scarce, and 1962 is still four years shy of the start of the geostationary satellite era, which began in 1966. Moreover, the Pacific Decadal Oscillation (PDO) was in the midst of a cold phase during this time period, which has a tendency to suppress Pacific hurricane activity. During the season, tropical cyclone advisories were issued by the Naval Fleet Warning Central (NFWC) in Alameda, which held responsibility for the basin until 1970.

== Systems ==
=== Hurricane Valerie ===
- Category 1 hurricane (SSHWS)
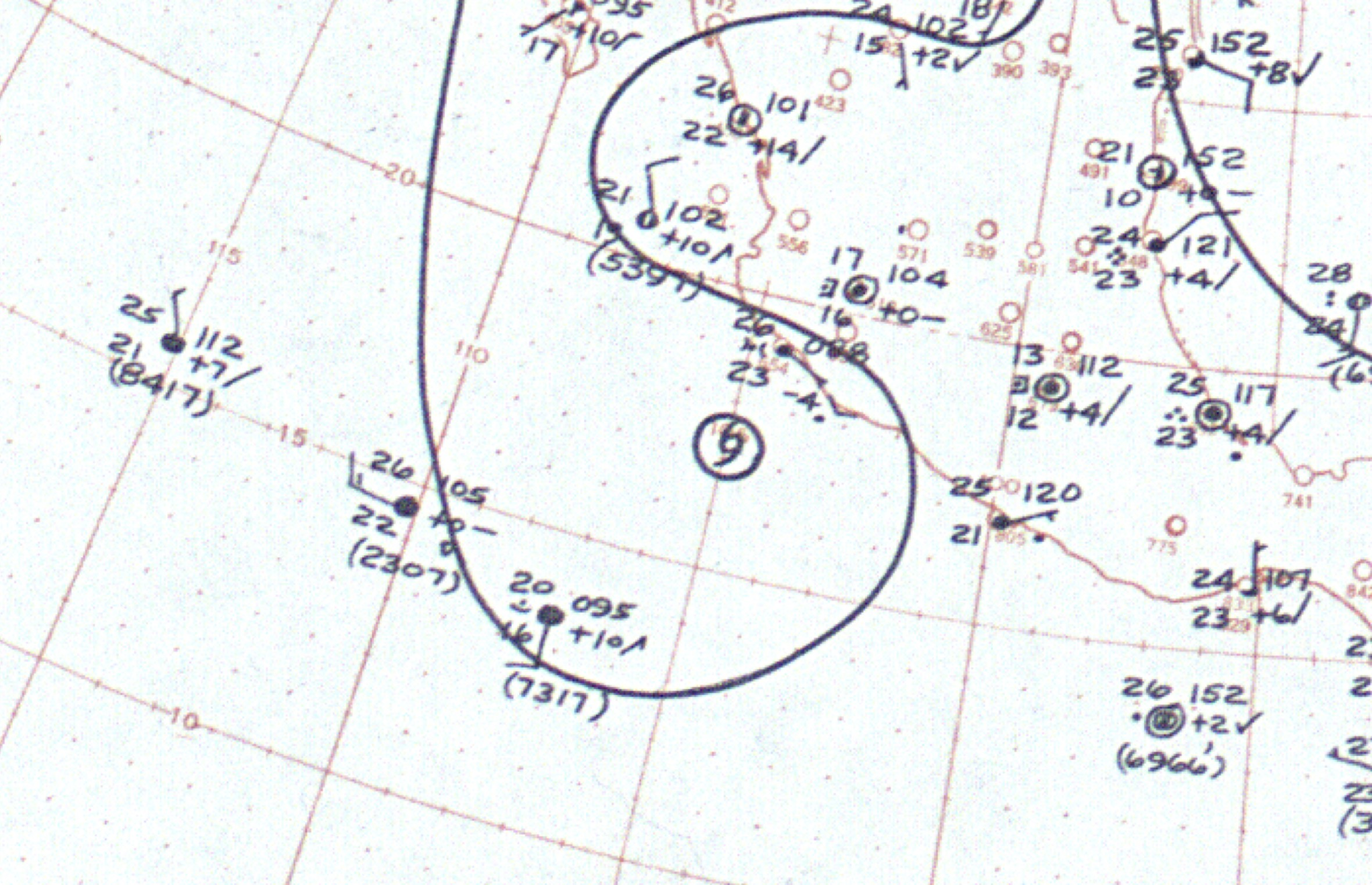
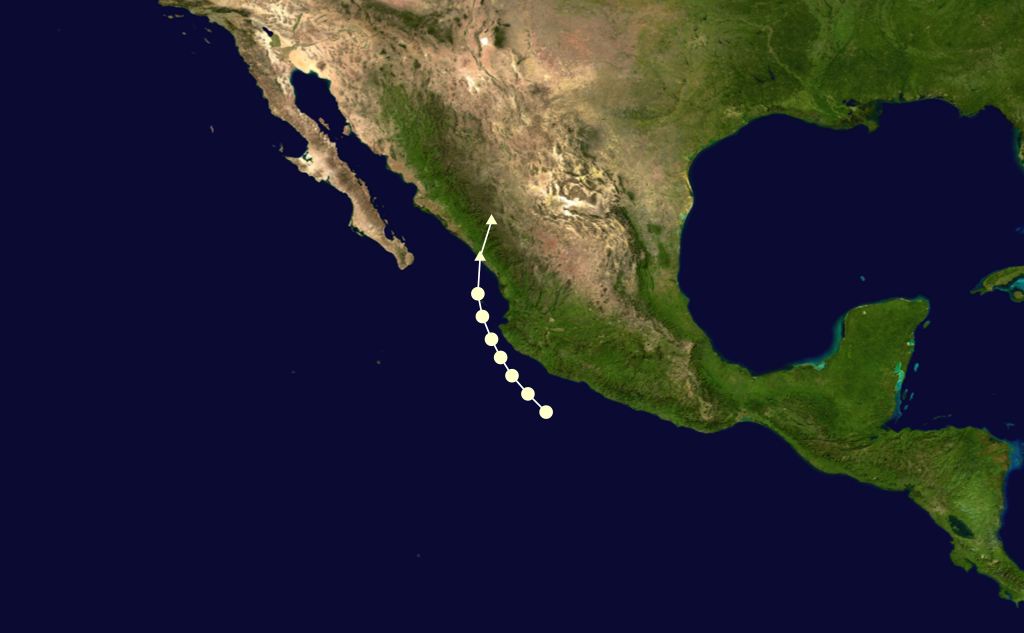
- Duration: June 24 – June 25
- Peak intensity: 85 mph (140 km/h) (1-min); 1003 mbar (hPa)

The first tropical cyclone of the season – Hurricane Valerie – was first observed on June 24, about 245 mi (400 km) west of Acapulco, Guerrero. It moved northwestward along the coast, producing high seas and strong winds in southwestern Mexico. Valerie was estimated to have attained peak winds of 85 mph (140 km/h). It turned to the northeast and struck near Mazatlán on June 25, dissipating early the next day.

=== Tropical Storm Willa ===
- Tropical storm (SSHWS)
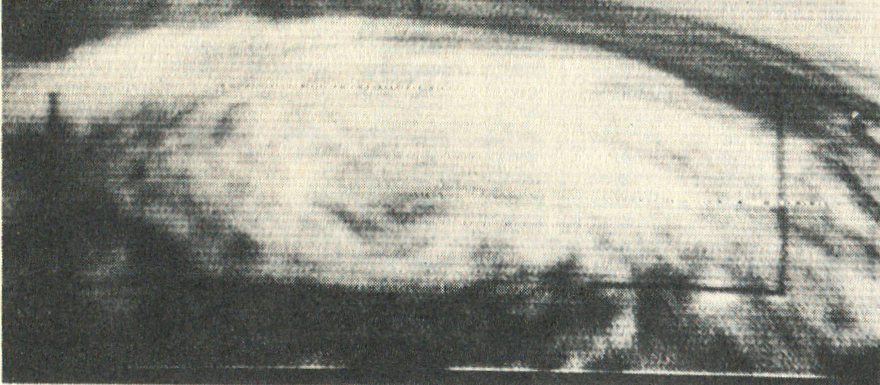
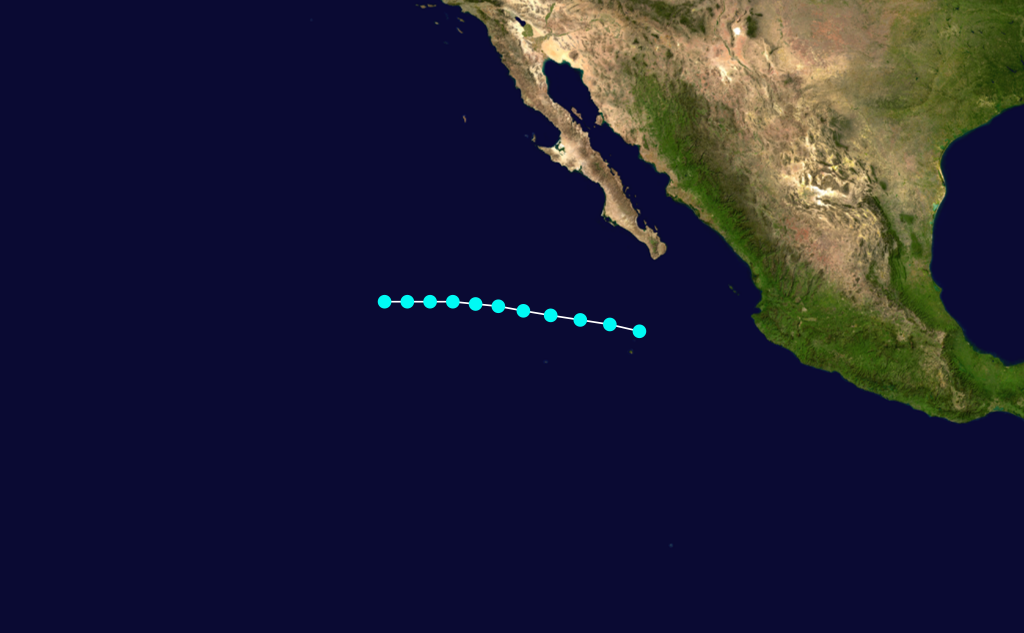
- Duration: July 8 – July 10
- Peak intensity: 50 mph (85 km/h) (1-min); 1008 mbar (hPa)

On July 8, Tropical Storm Willa developed south of the Baja California Peninsula. It maintained a west-northwestward track throughout its duration, remaining a minimal tropical storm. On July 10, the storm dissipated.

=== Tropical Storm Ava ===
- Tropical storm (SSHWS)
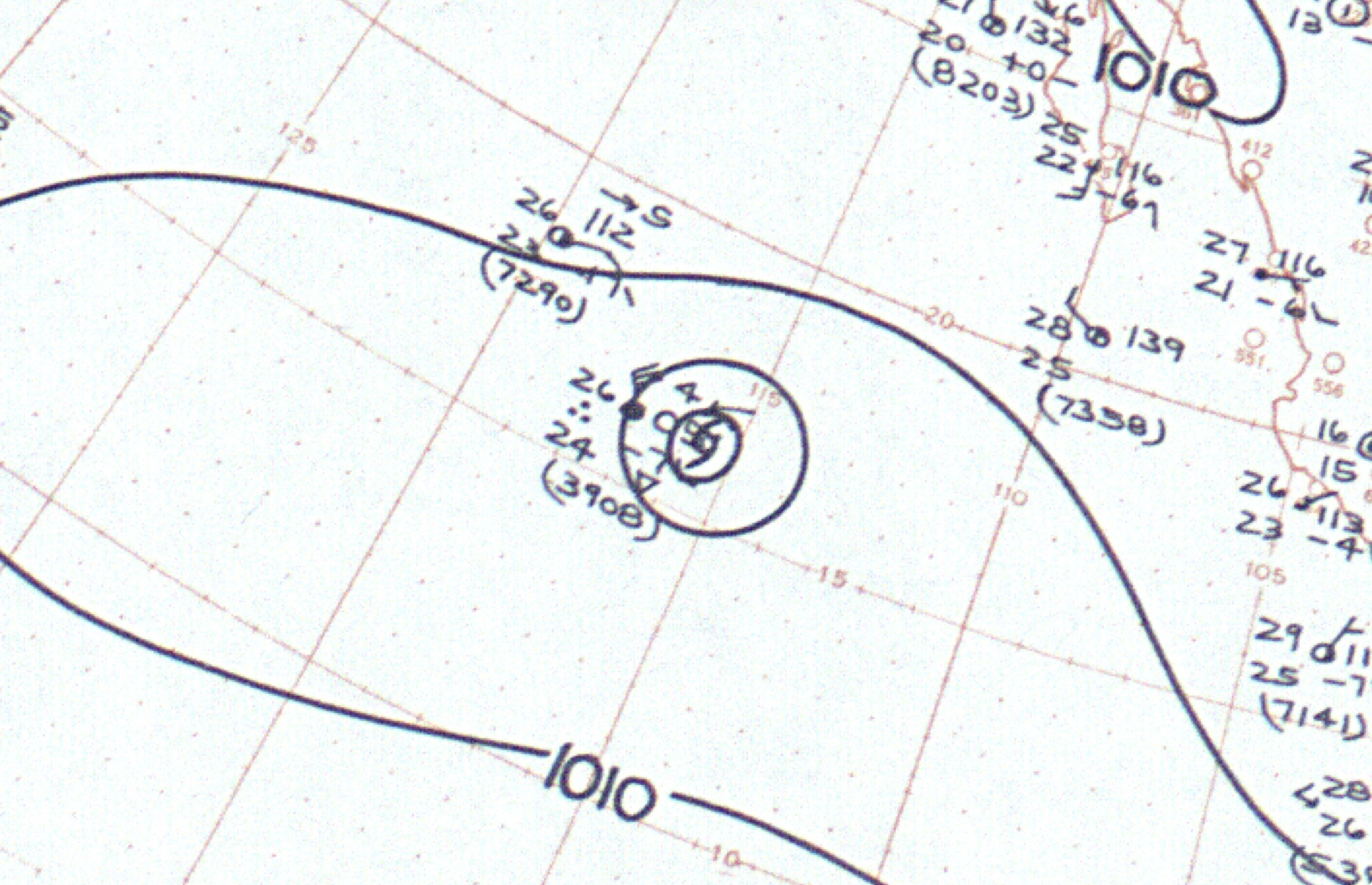
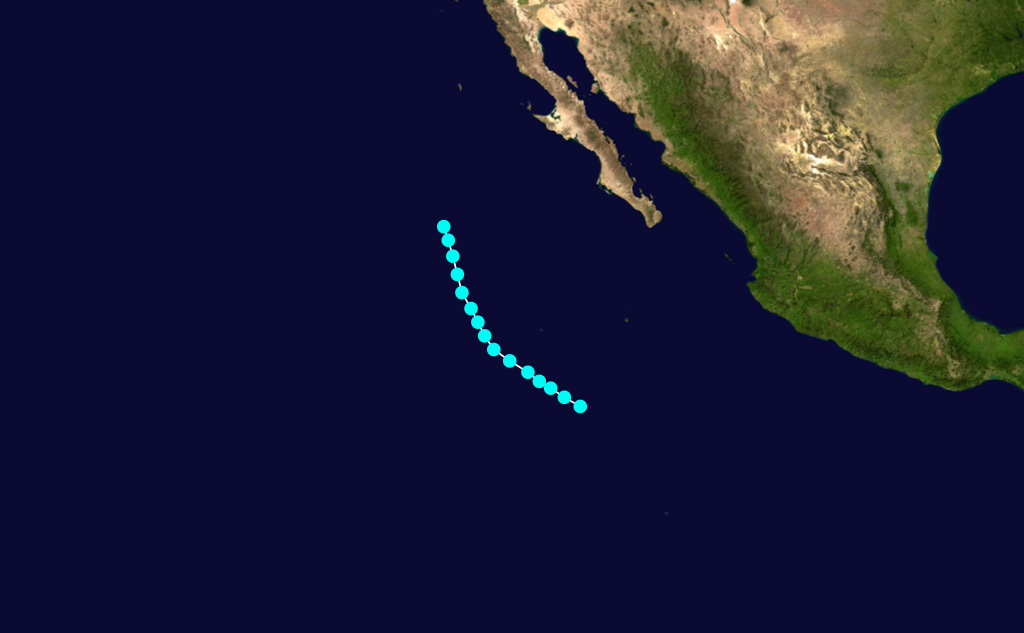
- Duration: August 16 – August 20
- Peak intensity: 50 mph (85 km/h) (1-min); 1002 mbar (hPa)

In the middle of August, a tropical storm formed off the southwest coast of Mexico. Given the name Ava, it tracked to the northwest before turning more to the north. It dissipated on August 20.

=== Unnamed August tropical storm ===
- Tropical storm (SSHWS)
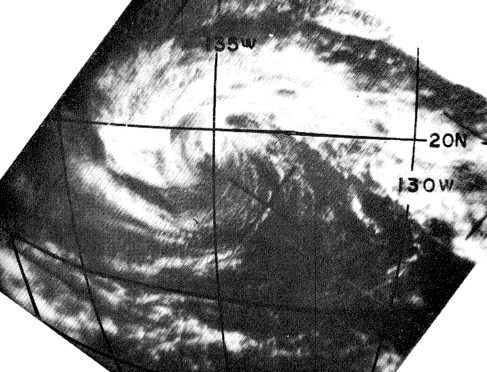
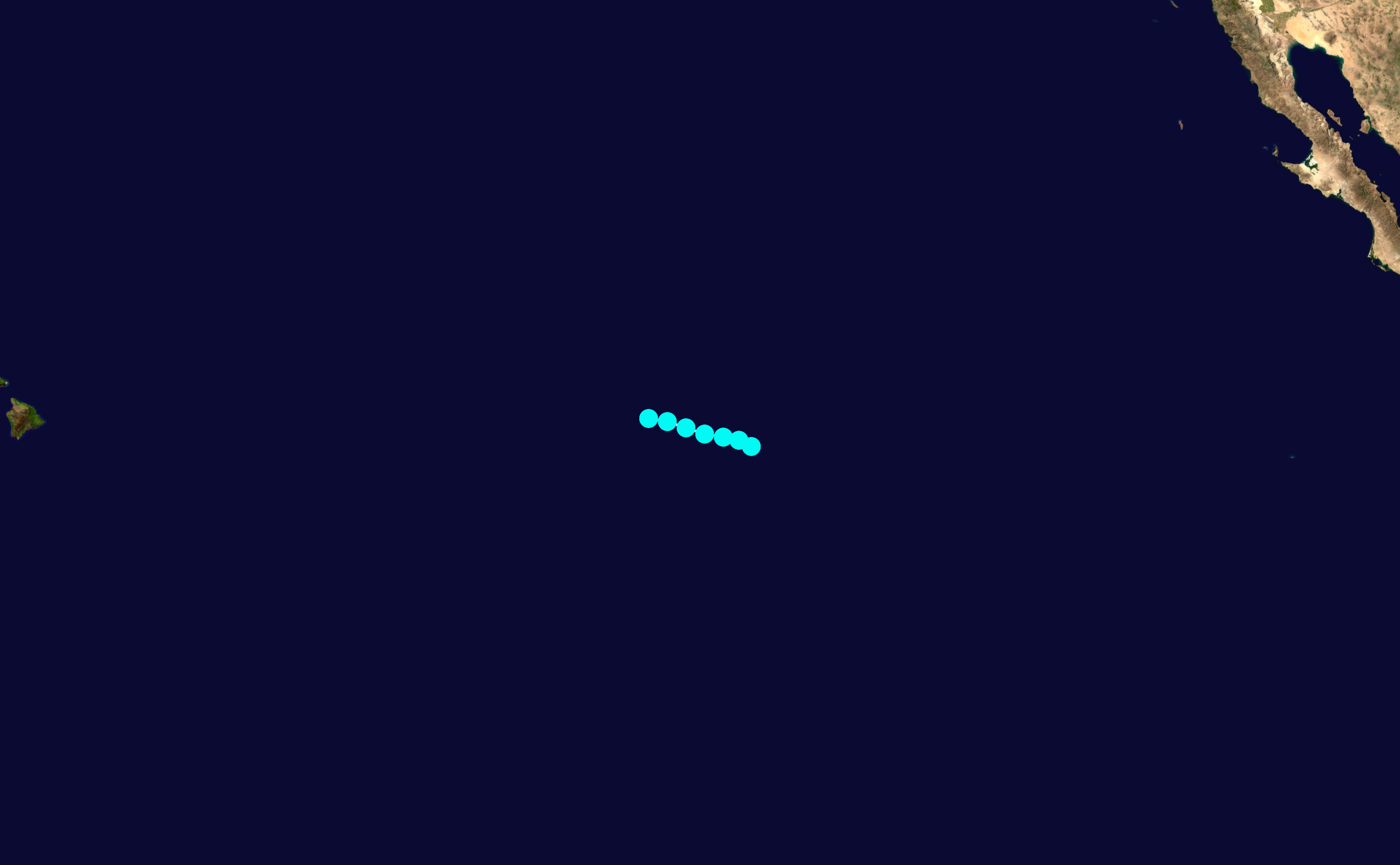
- Duration: August 20 – August 22
- Peak intensity: 50 mph (85 km/h) (1-min); 1002 mbar (hPa)

As the previous storm was dissipating, another tropical storm developed to its west. Lasting only two days, it dissipated on August 22 about halfway between Hawaii and the west coast of Mexico.

=== Hurricane "C" ===
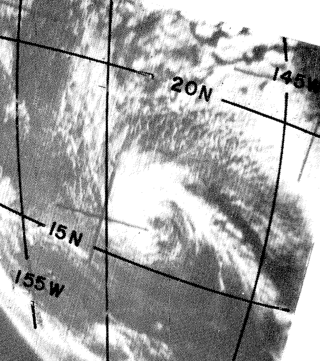
- Duration: August 24 – September 2

On August 24, satellite imagery indicated a hurricane with a defined eye was located over the central Pacific Ocean. It slowly weakened as it moved over lukewarm waters, and deteriorated more rapidly after wind shear increased. By August 28, the system consisted of a circulation with only weak associated convection. It weakened to a tropical depression on August 30, although it remained a tropical cyclone until September 2. At that time it was last observed about 200 mi (320 km) south of Hilo, Hawaii.

=== Tropical Storm Bernice ===
- Tropical storm (SSHWS)
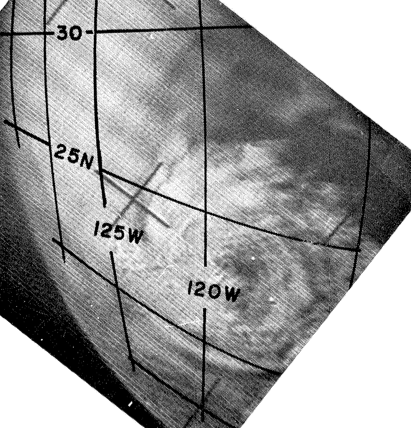
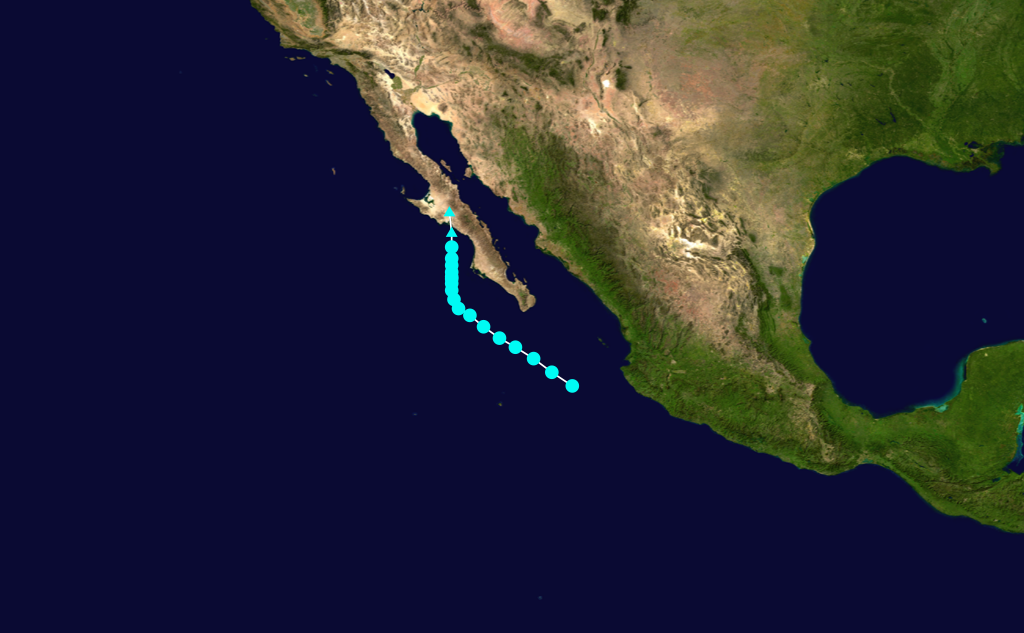
- Duration: September 2 – September 6
- Peak intensity: 50 mph (85 km/h) (1-min); 986 mbar (hPa)

A tropical storm named Bernice developed on September 2 west of Jalisco. After moving northwestward for two days, the storm turned to the north, striking Baja California on September 6 before dissipating. The remnants of the storm later brought moderate rain to Arizona.

=== Tropical Storm Claudia ===
- Tropical storm (SSHWS)
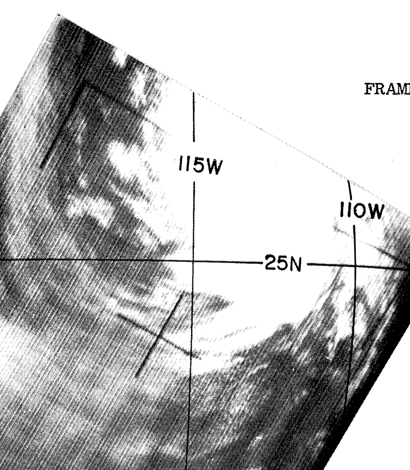
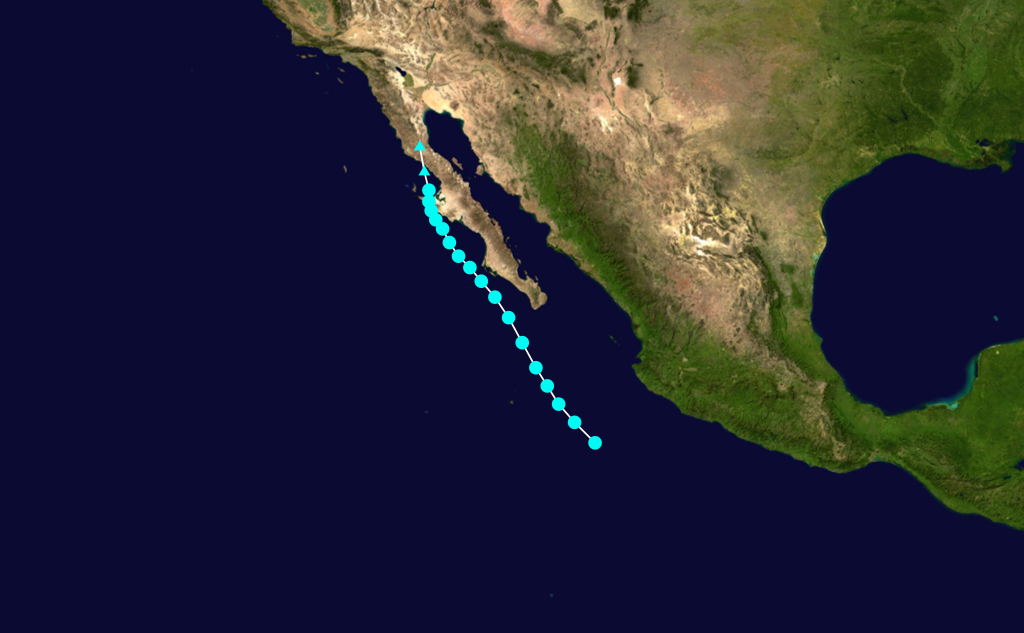
- Duration: September 20 – September 24
- Peak intensity: 50 mph (85 km/h) (1-min); 990 mbar (hPa)

Later in the month, another storm similar to Bernice existed. Tropical Storm Claudia formed on September 20 to the southwest of Acapulco. It maintained a general northwest movement for its duration. On September 23, Claudia crossed over the western portion of the Baja California peninsula, moved over water, and again struck the peninsula before dissipating.

The remnant moisture caused severe flash floods in the vicinity of Tucson, with 5 to 7 inches (130 to 180 mm) of precipitation falling over the headwaters of the washes of Santa Rosa, Jackrabbit, and Brawley during a 14- to 15-hour period. Over 7 inches (180 mm) of rainfall also fell near the Arizona-Sonora Desert Museum. The ensuing flood of the Santa Cruz River and its tributaries produced a path of destruction about 100 miles (160 km) long and up to 8 miles (13 km) wide. Santa Rosa Wash conveyed 53,100 cubic feet per second (1,500 m^{3}/s) at its peak; Los Robles Wash carried up to 32,600 cu ft/s (920 m^{3}/s), while the Santa Cruz River proper peaked at 9,200 cu ft/s (260 m^{3}/s). The washes and rivers reached depths of up to 20 feet (6.1 m), and overflowed its banks in places by 1 to 6 feet (0.30 to 1.83 m). Flooding from the storm inundated the towns of Marana and Sells, both in Pima County. Helicopters rescued 27 families from Fort Huachuca. There was one indirect death related to the flooding, due to an ambulance not being able to reach an elderly woman. The flooding also killed many cattle, and damage in Pima and Pinal counties exceeded $11 million (1962 USD), much of it from crop damage. The flooding prompted a disaster declaration by former governor Paul Fannin, which provided funds for the affected people.

=== Unnamed September tropical storm ===
- Tropical storm (SSHWS)
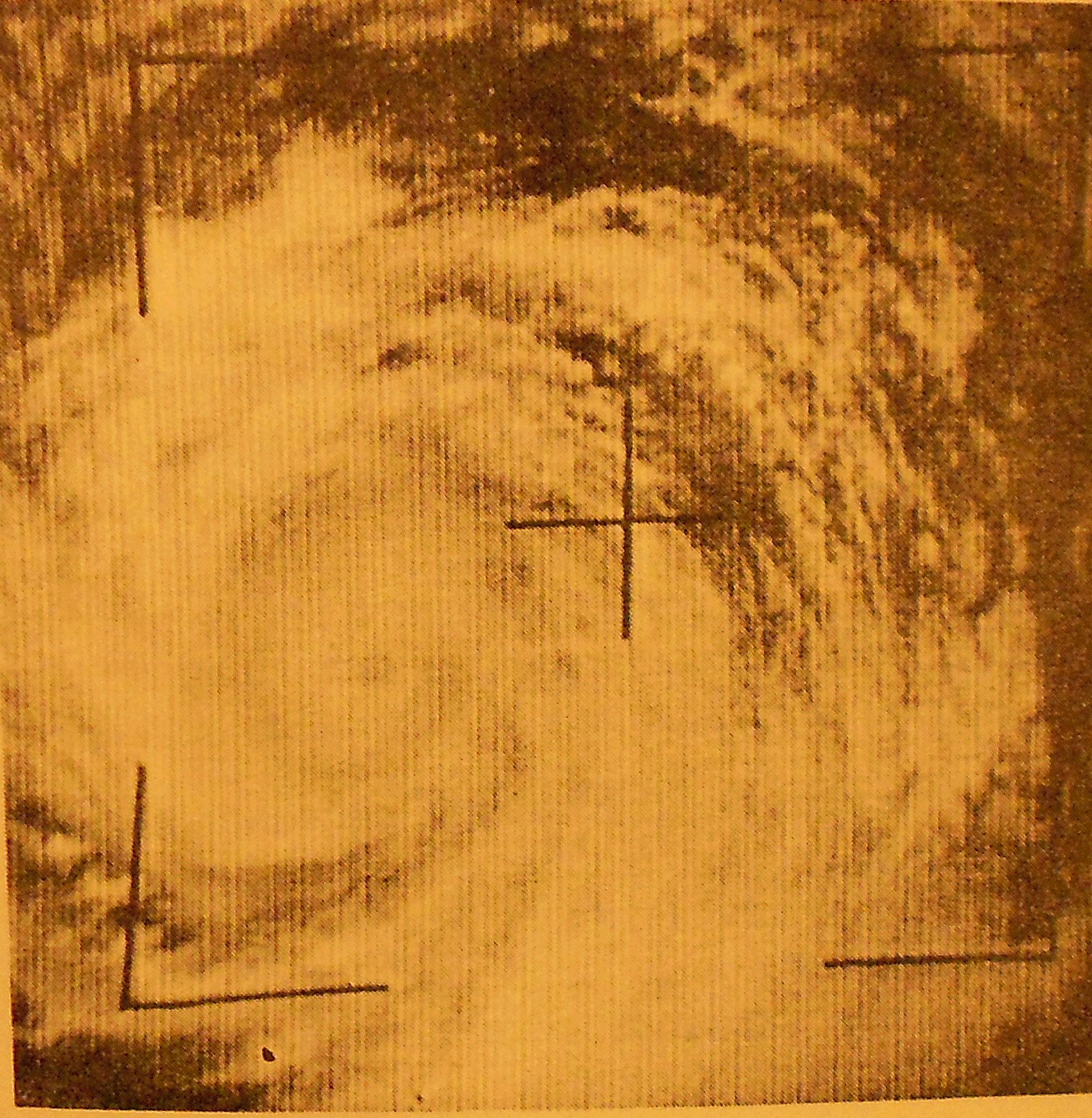
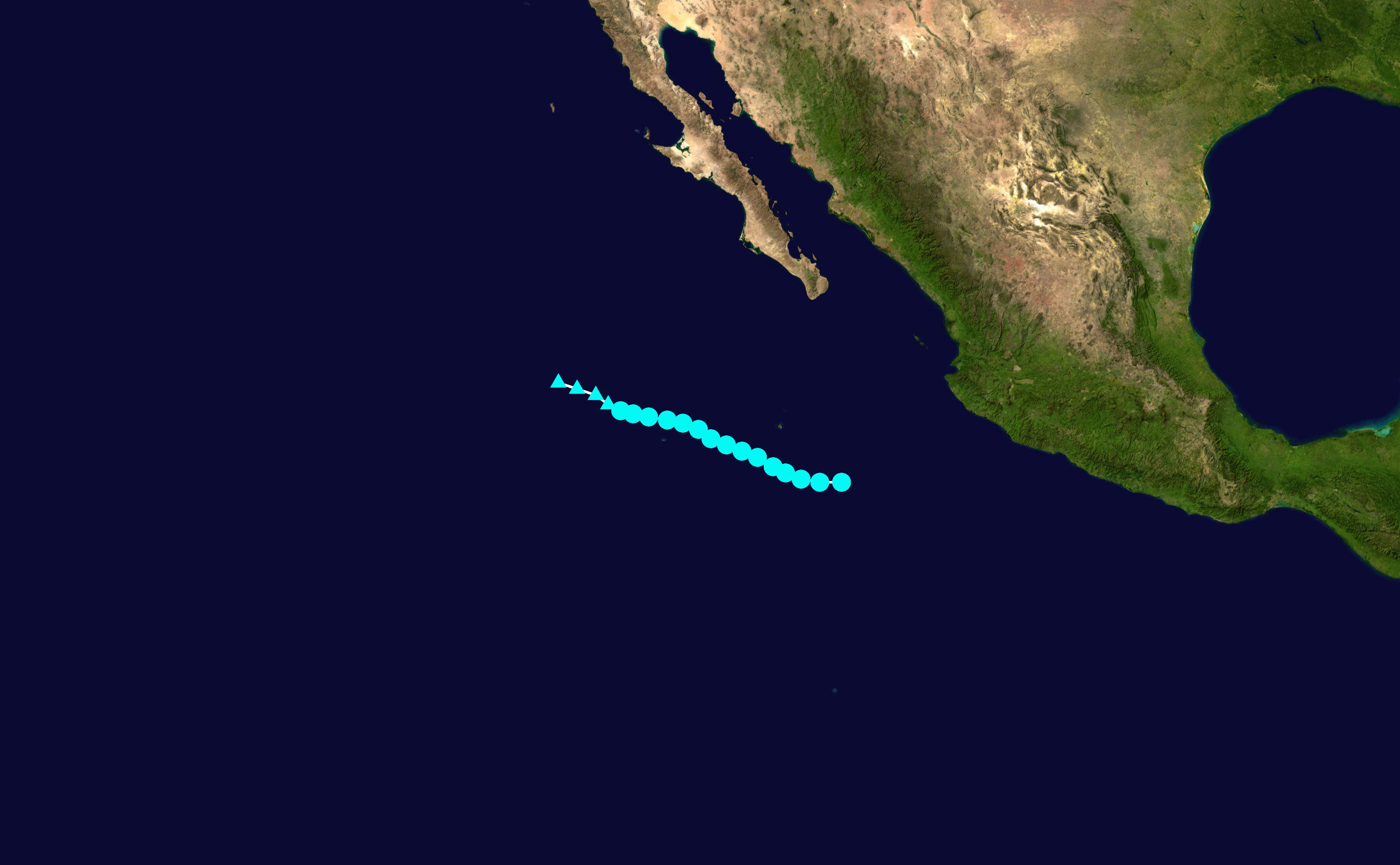
- Duration: September 25 – September 30
- Peak intensity: 50 mph (85 km/h) (1-min); 1001 mbar (hPa)

On September 26, a tropical storm developed off the southwest coast of Mexico. The storm moved to the west-northwest for several days, dissipating on September 30.

=== September and October Central Pacific tropical cyclones ===
In September and October, satellite imagery indicated that there were five tropical storms in the central Pacific Ocean. The first, designated Tropical Storm "R", passed about 200 mi (320 km) north of Palmyra Island on September 28. It represented about 1% of storms in the basin to directly affect the island, after it produced westerly winds there. Tropical Storm "T" existed on September 29 without affecting land. Similarly, Tropical Storm "X" existed on October 2 over open Pacific waters. The next day, Tropical Storm "Z" passed near Johnston Island during the Operation Dominic I and II nuclear tests, although no impact was reported. Lastly, satellite imagery indicated Tropical Storm "A" on October 27 to the northeast of Palmyra Island.

=== Hurricane Doreen ===
- Category 1 hurricane (SSHWS)
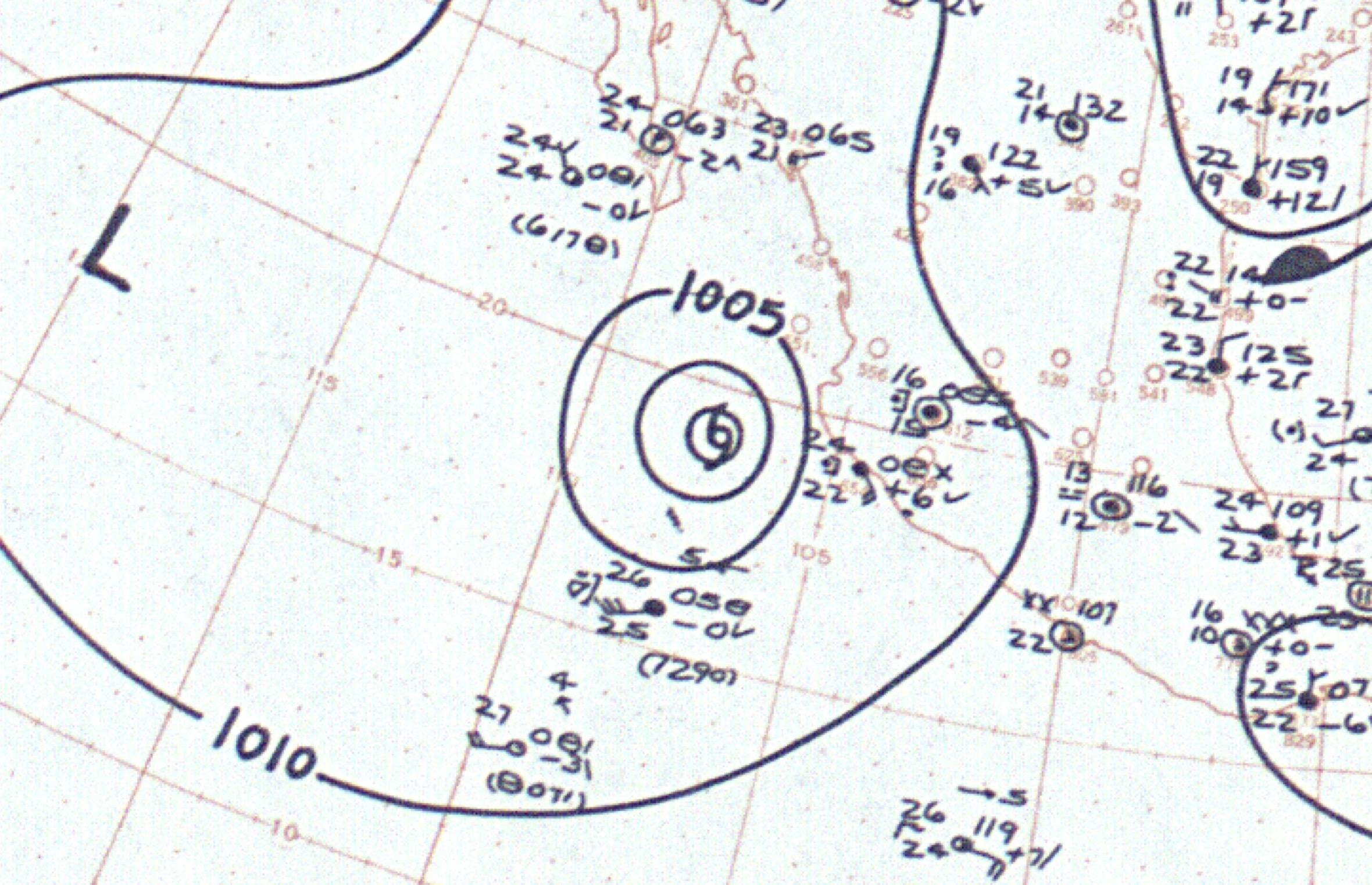
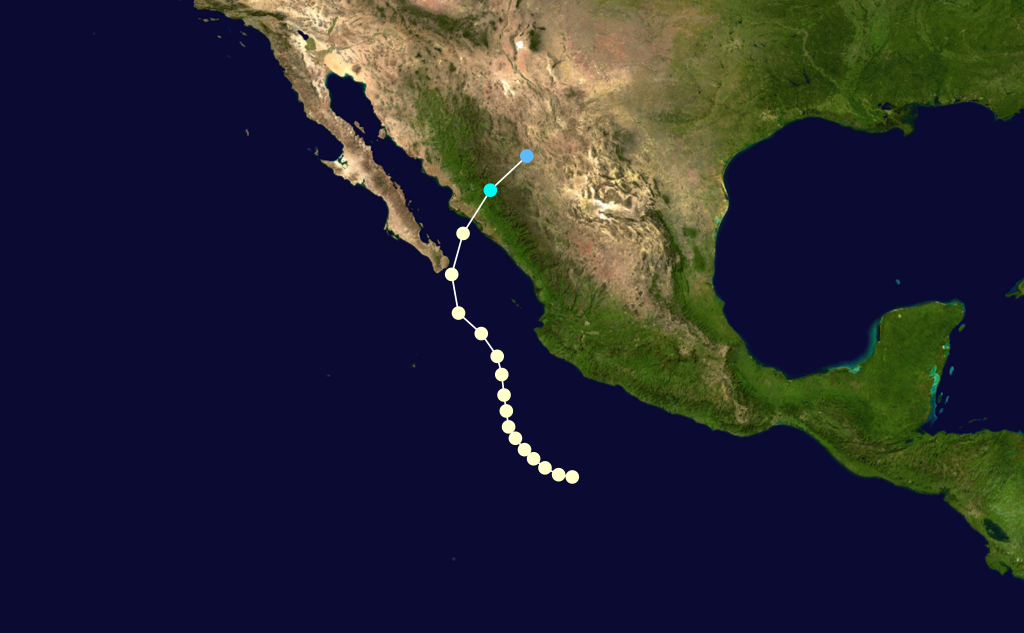
- Duration: October 1 – October 5
- Peak intensity: 85 mph (140 km/h) (1-min); 980 mbar (hPa)

The last storm of the season was Hurricane Doreen, which formed on October 1 off the southwest Mexican coast. It moved northwestward before curving to the north, although later it turned again to the northwest. Doreen was estimated to have attained peak winds of 85 mph (140 km/h). On October 4, Doreen made its closest approach to the southern tip of the Baja California peninsula as it began a motion to the northeast. Later that day, the hurricane moved over Sinaloa before dissipating on October 5. Hurricane Doreen was responsible for light rainfall in the U.S. states of Arizona, New Mexico, and West Texas.

=== Tropical depressions ===
There were two non-developing tropical depressions during the season.

Surface observations and satellite imagery indicated the formation of a tropical depression about 275 mi (443 km) north of Palmyra Island on July 29. It moved west-northwestward without developing further, and eventually dissipated on August 2 over the central Pacific.

On August 31, the Joint Hurricane Warning Center named a tropical depression in the Central Pacific basin as Tropical Depression 63, following the West Pacific's numbering. The advisories were discontinued 275 nautical miles (509 km) from the South Point of Big Island, where it was no longer considered a threat to shipping lanes or any land masses.

== Storm names ==
The following names were used for tropical storms that formed in the North Pacific Ocean east of 140°W during 1962. The names came from a series of four rotating lists. Names were used one after the other without regard to year, and when the bottom of one list was reached, the next named storm received the name at the top of the next list.

- Valerie
- Willa
- Ava
- Bernice
- Claudia
- Doreen

Had any tropical storms formed in the North Pacific between 140°W and the International Date Line in 1962, their names would have been drawn from the Western Pacific typhoon naming list.

== See also ==
- List of Pacific hurricanes
- Pacific hurricane season
- 1962 Atlantic hurricane season
- 1962 Pacific typhoon season
- Australian region cyclone seasons: 1961–62 1962–63
- South Pacific cyclone seasons: 1961–62 1962–63
- South-West Indian Ocean cyclone seasons: 1961–62 1962–63
