= 1961–62 South-West Indian Ocean cyclone season =

Cyclone season in the Southwest Indian Ocean

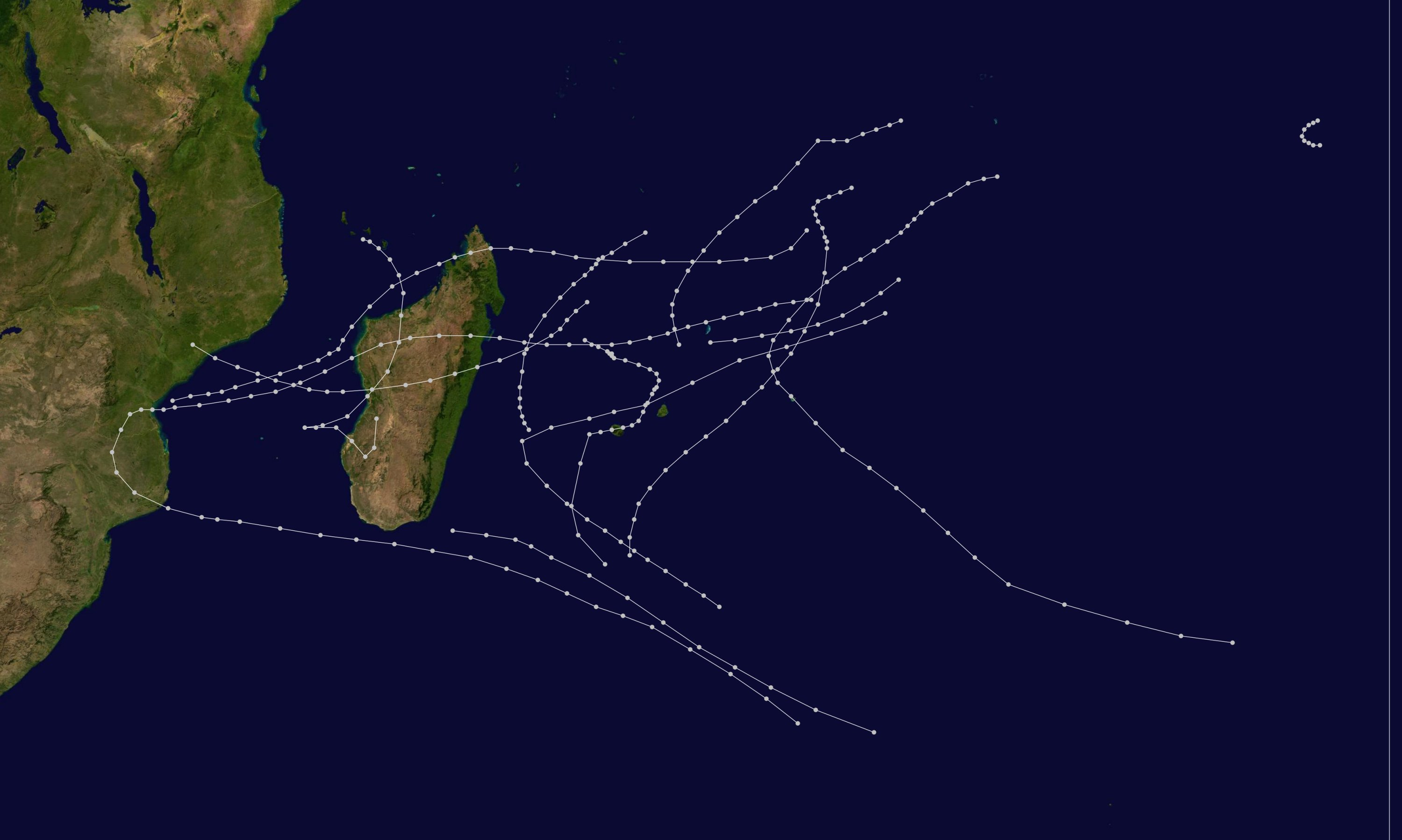
- Season summary map

Seasonal boundaries
- First system formed: December 19, 1961
- Last system dissipated: April 11, 1962

Strongest storm
- Name: Daisy & Maud
  - Maximum winds: 140 km/h (85 mph) (1-minute sustained)

Seasonal statistics
- Total depressions: 13
- Tropical cyclones: 5
- Total fatalities: 51
- Total damage: Unknown

Related articles
- 1961–62 Australian region cyclone season; 1961–62 South Pacific cyclone season

The 1961–62 South-West Indian Ocean cyclone season was a busy cyclone season, lasting from December to April.

== Systems ==
=== Tropical Storm Ada ===
- Tropical storm (SSHWS)
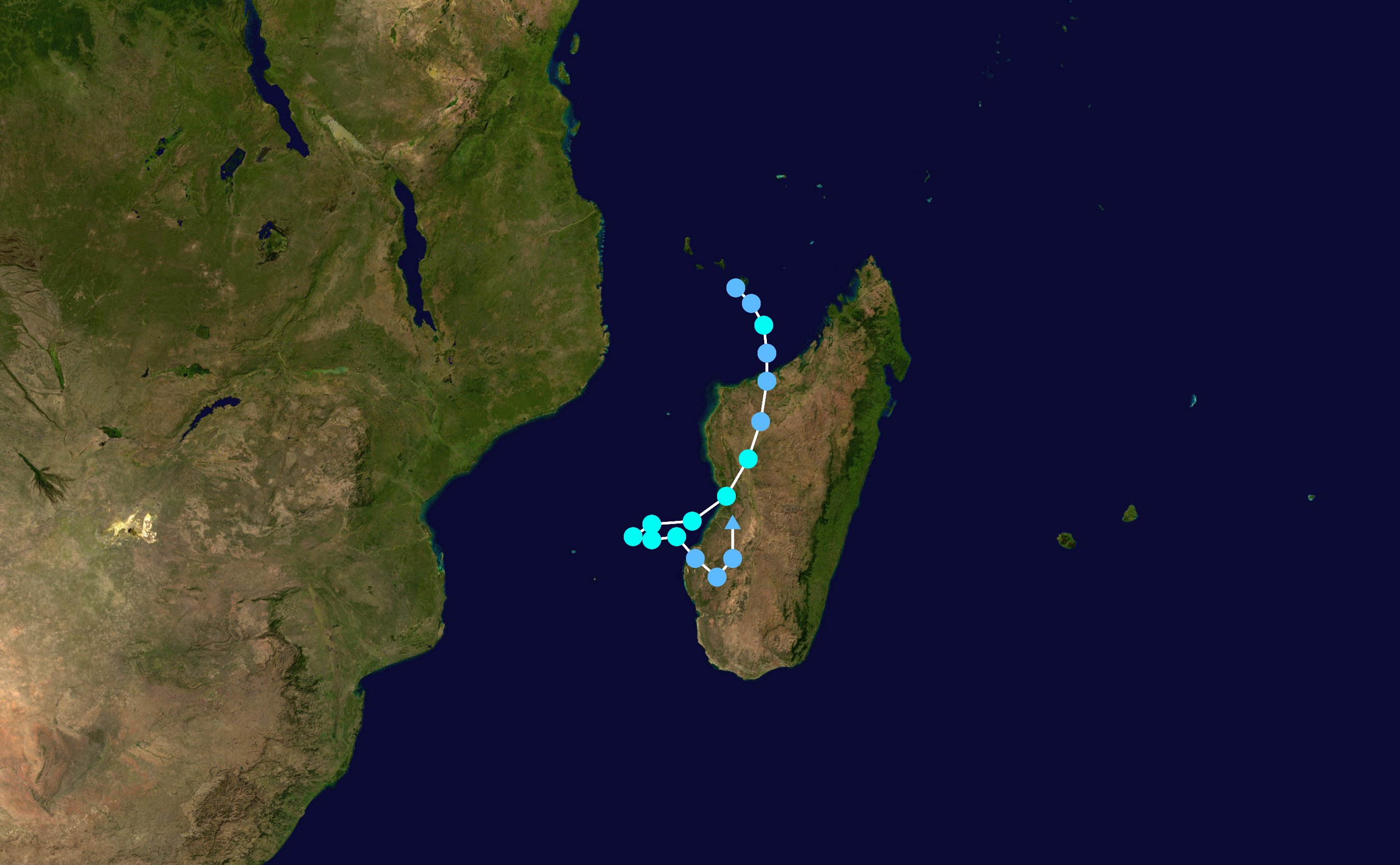
- Duration: December 19 – December 24
- Peak intensity: 65 km/h (40 mph) (1-min);

Ada lasted for 5 days and made landfall in Madagascar. Its peak intensity was 40 mph, or 65 km/h, in 1-minute maximum sustained winds.

=== Cyclone Beryl ===
- Category 1 tropical cyclone (SSHWS)
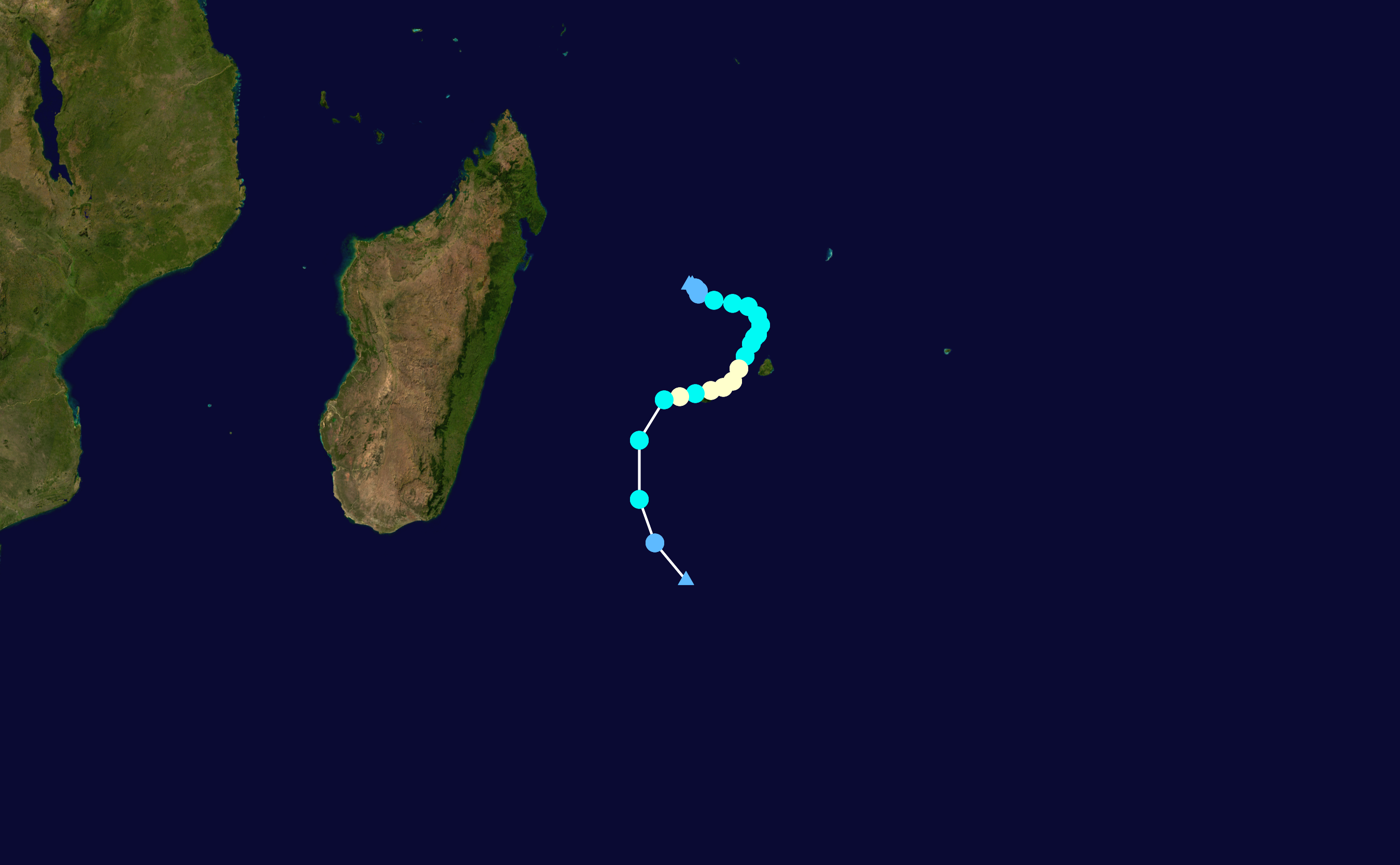
- Duration: December 20 – December 28
- Peak intensity: 130 km/h (80 mph) (1-min); 992 hPa (mbar)

=== Cyclone Chantal ===
- Category 1 tropical cyclone (SSHWS)
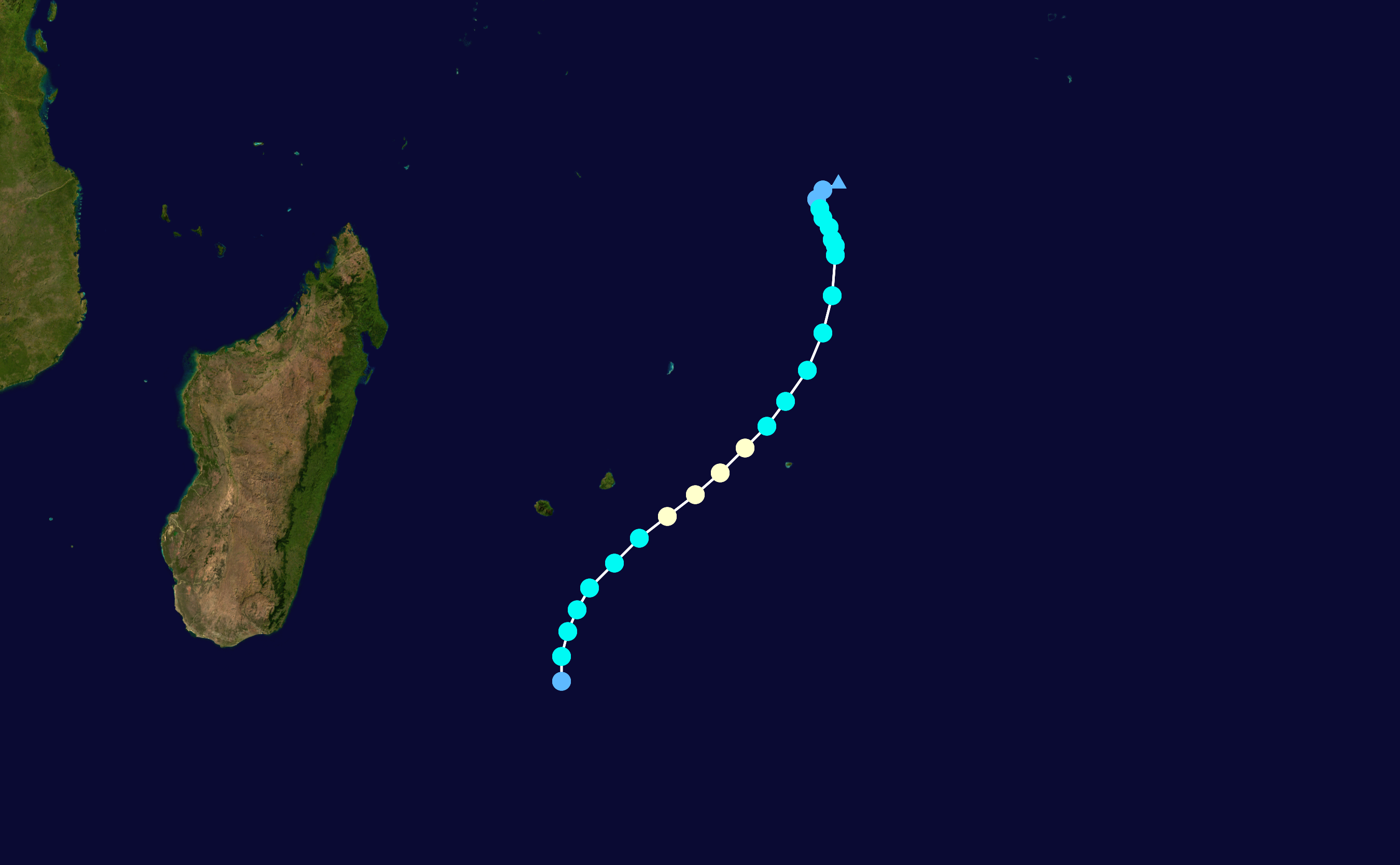
- Duration: December 30, 1961 – January 7, 1962
- Peak intensity: 130 km/h (80 mph) (1-min);

=== Cyclone Daisy ===
- Category 1 tropical cyclone (SSHWS)
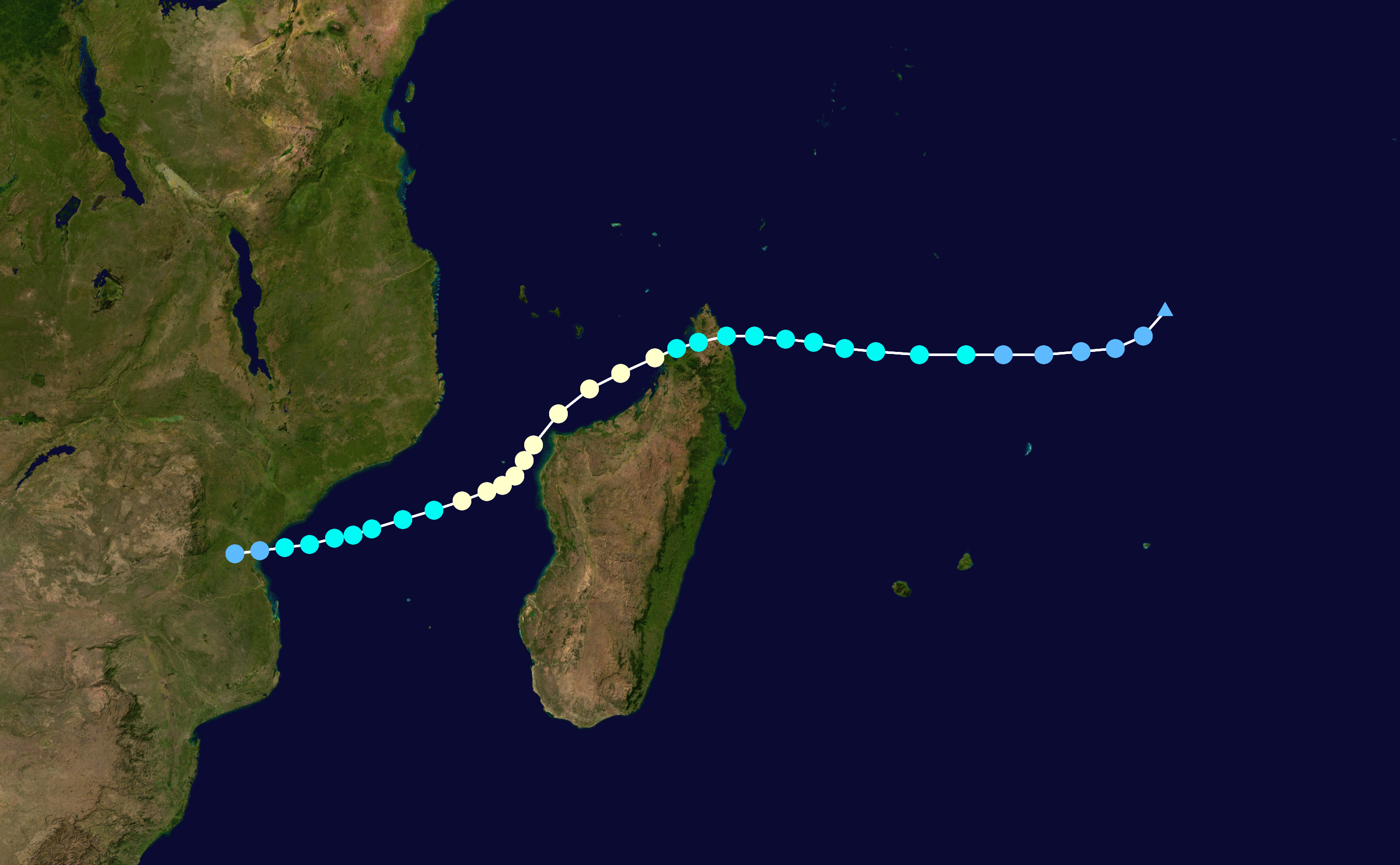
- Duration: January 15 – January 22
- Peak intensity: 140 km/h (85 mph) (1-min);

=== Tropical Storm Flora ===
- Tropical storm (SSHWS)
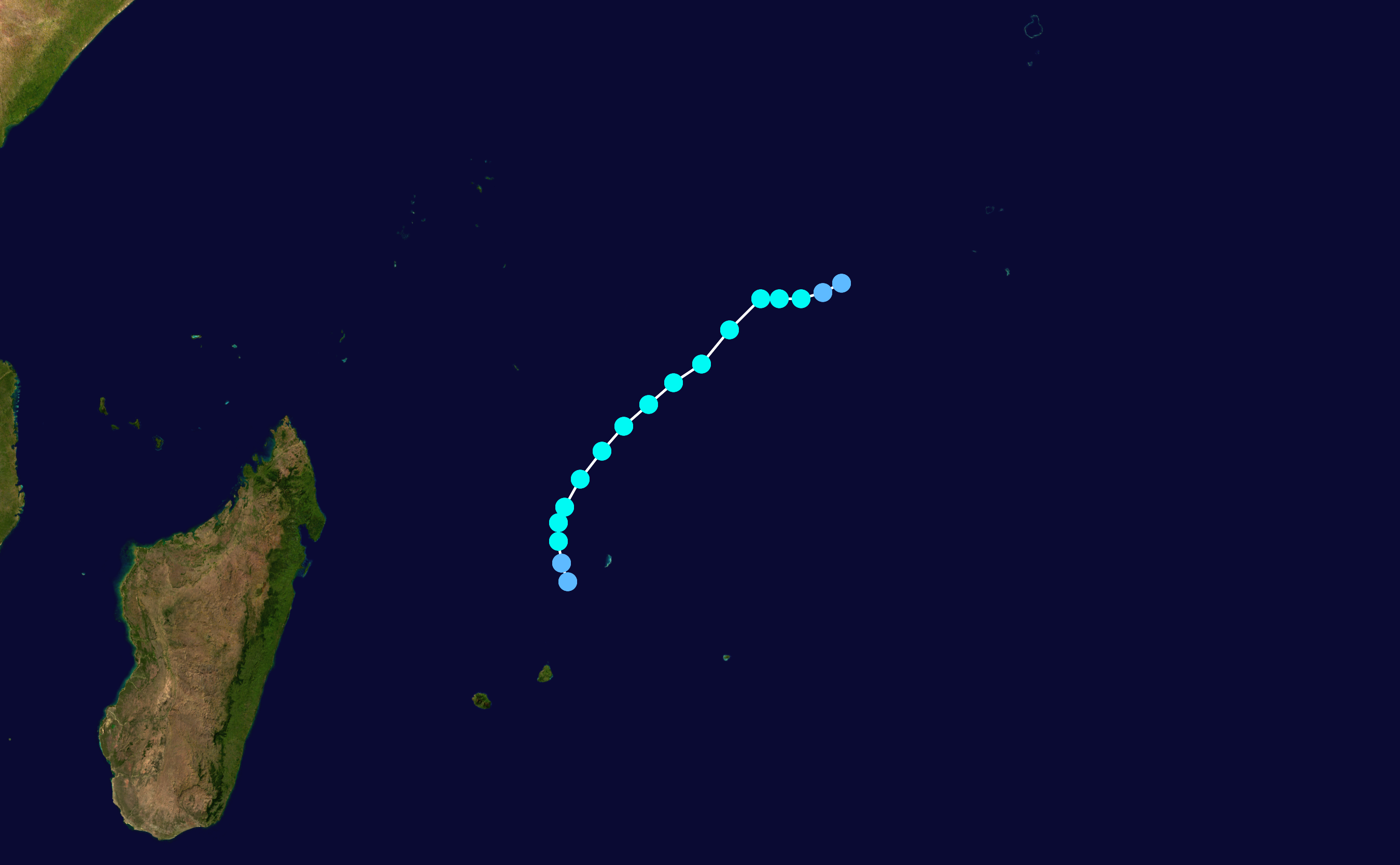
- Duration: January 21 – January 24
- Peak intensity: 65 km/h (40 mph) (1-min);

=== Tropical Storm Gina ===
- Tropical storm (SSHWS)
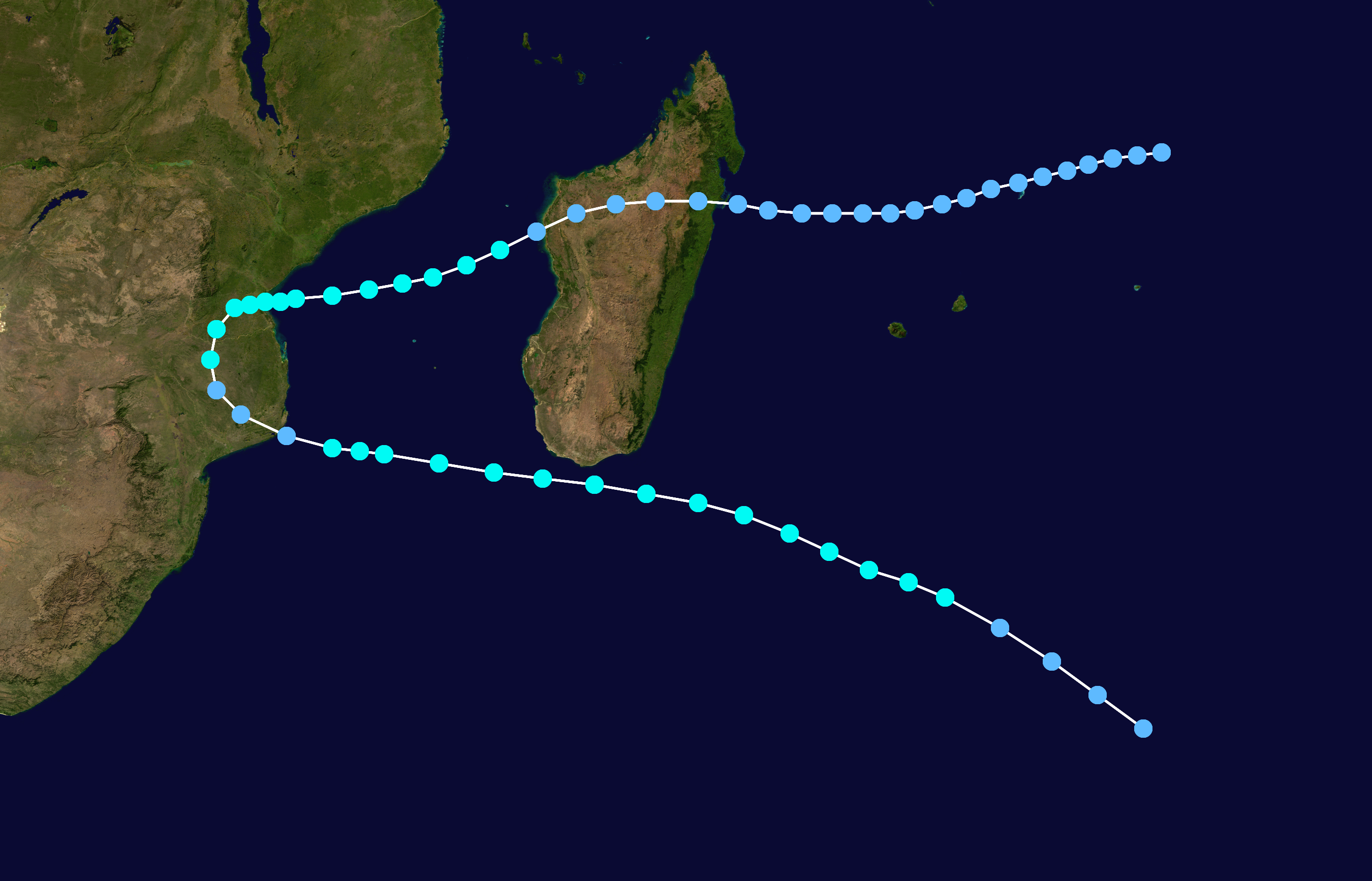
- Duration: February 8 – February 18
- Peak intensity: 65 km/h (40 mph) (1-min);

The storm struck Madagascar and moved across the island, later crossing the Mozambique Channel and striking eastern Mozambique. The storm recurved to the east, passing south of Madagascar.

=== Tropical Depression Helene ===
- Tropical depression (SSHWS)
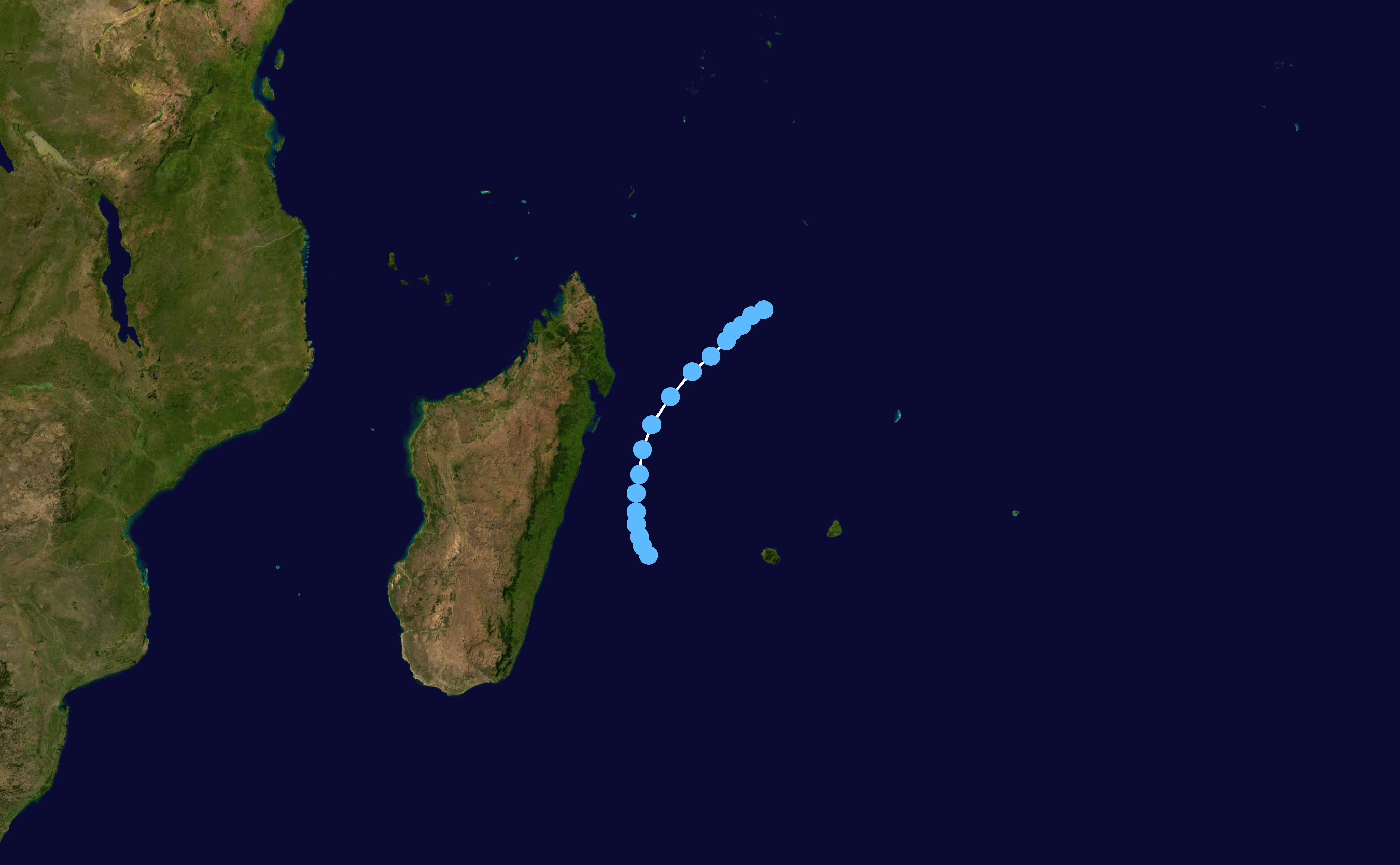
- Duration: February 16 – February 19
- Peak intensity: 55 km/h (35 mph) (1-min);

=== Tropical Storm Isabel ===
- Tropical storm (SSHWS)
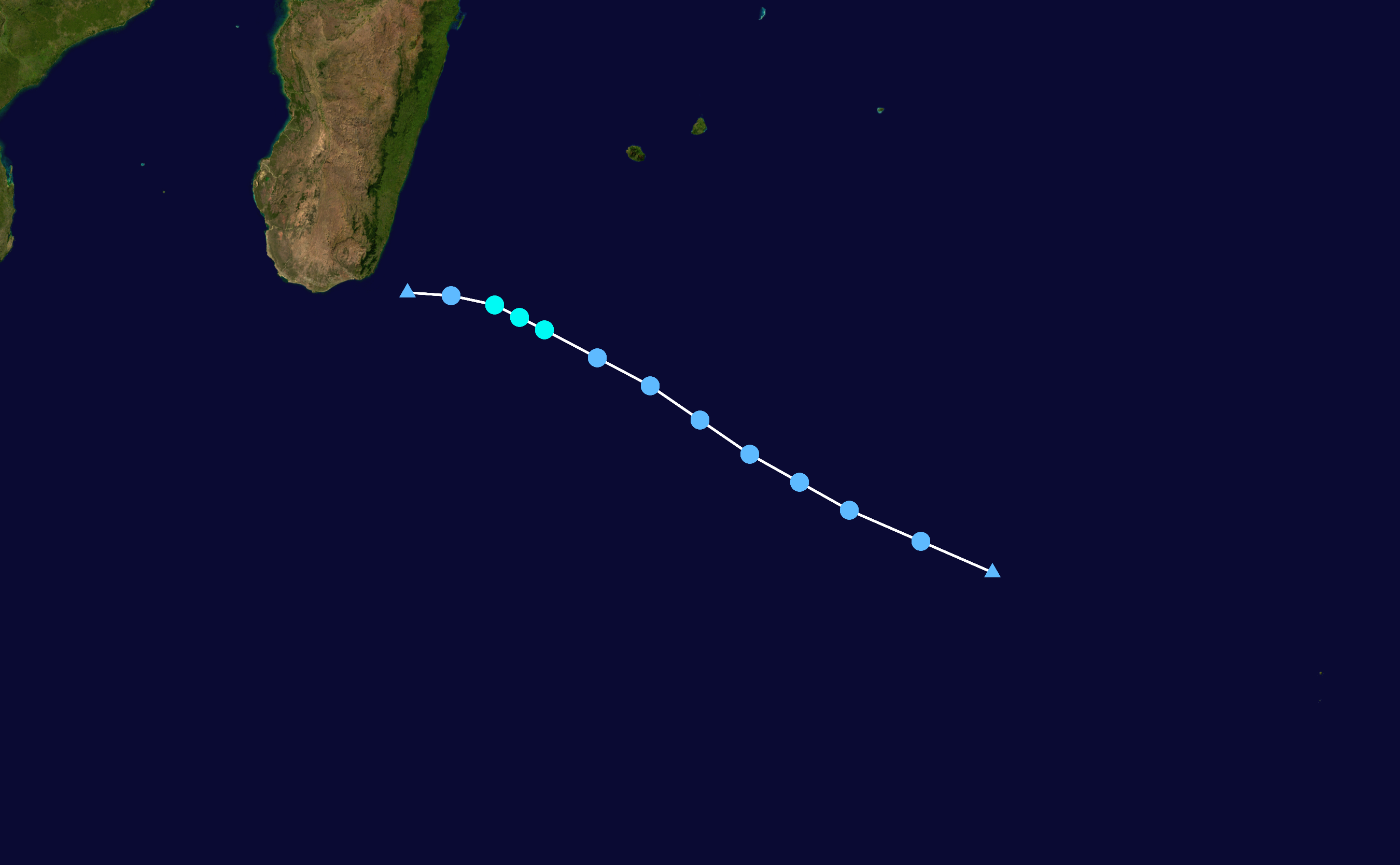
- Duration: February 21 – February 24
- Peak intensity: 65 km/h (40 mph) (1-min);

Existed southeast of Madagascar.

=== Cyclone Jenny ===
- Category 1 tropical cyclone (SSHWS)
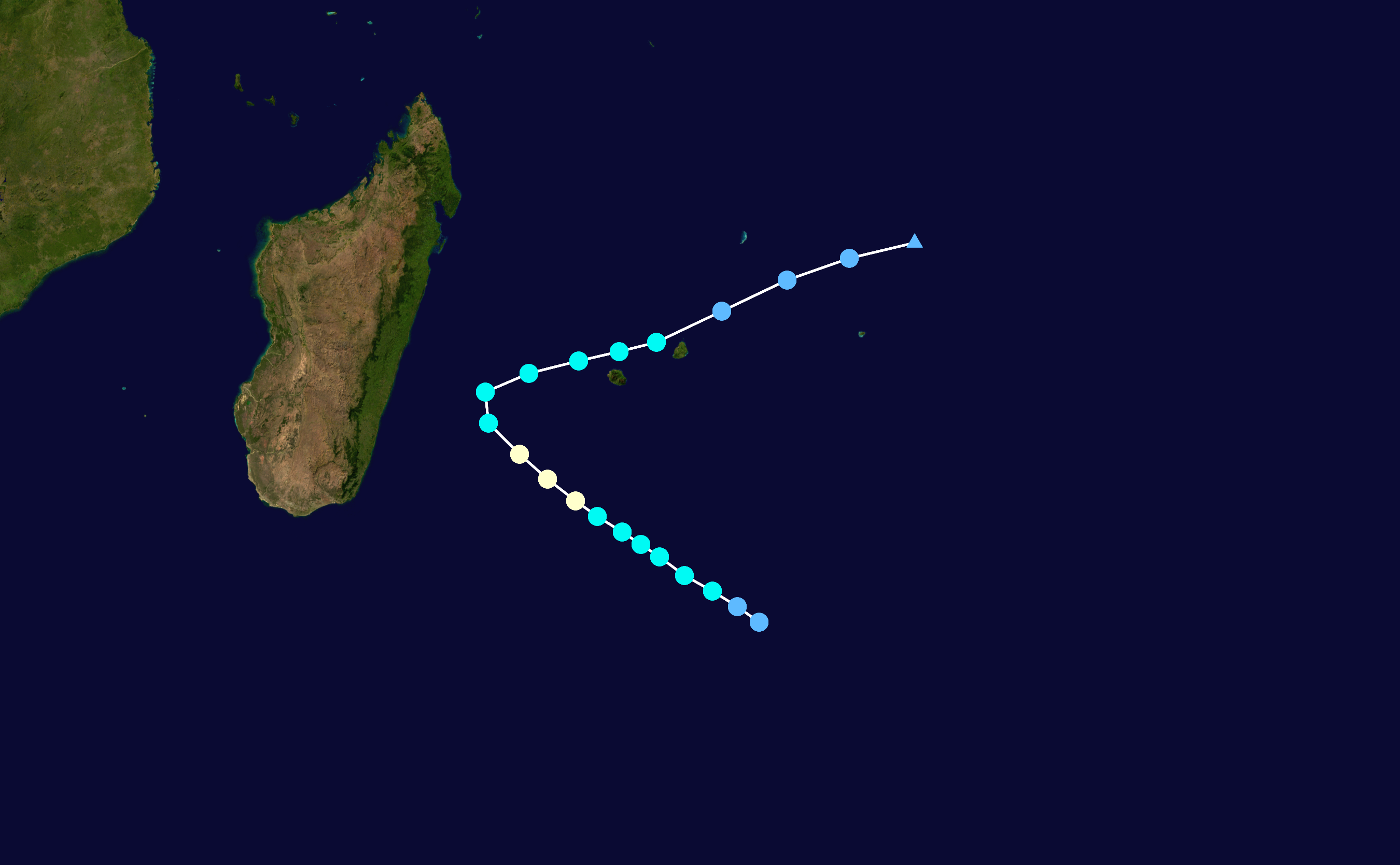
- Duration: February 26 – March 5
- Peak intensity: 130 km/h (80 mph) (1-min); 995 hPa (mbar)

On February 26, Cyclone Jenny was first observed to the northeast of Rodrigues. The storm moved west-southwestward between Rodrigues and St. Brandon. On February 28, Jenny passed about 30 km (20 mi) north of Mauritius, where the storm produced wind gusts of 235 km/h (146 mph). On the island, the storm killed 17 people and left thousands of people homeless. Later on February 28, the storm struck Réunion, killing 36 people; wind gusts at the Roland Garros Airport reached 250 km/h (160 mph). Jenny destroyed 3,851 homes on Réunion and severely damaged another 2,619, many of them wooden, leaving about 20,000 people homeless. The storm also destroyed crops, and wrecked about 80% of the island's telephone lines. After the close succession of Carol and Jenny, officials rebuilt most homes with concrete to withstand future storms.

=== Tropical Storm Kate ===
- Tropical storm (SSHWS)
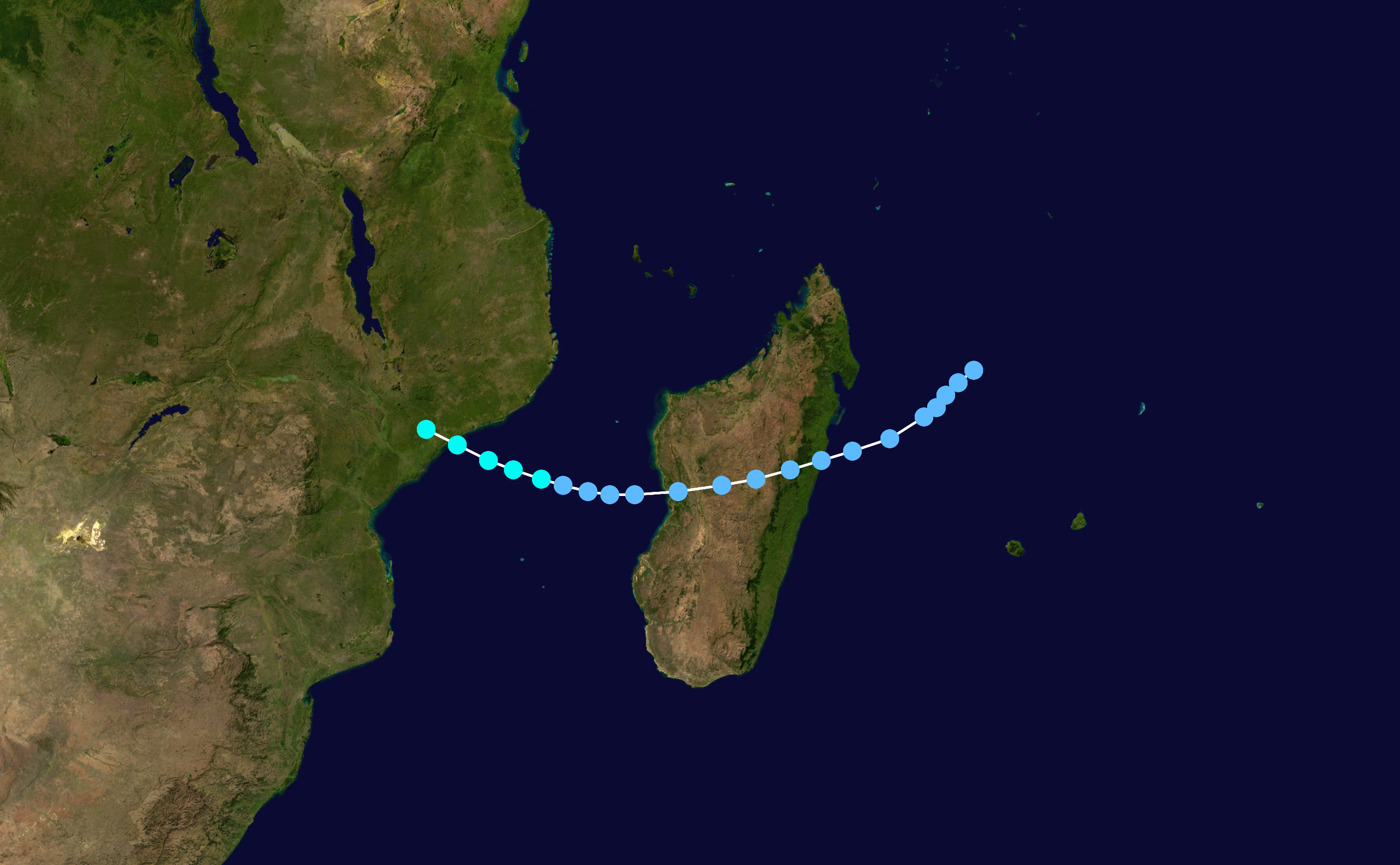
- Duration: March 9 – March 15
- Peak intensity: 65 km/h (40 mph) (1-min);

Struck eastern Madagascar.

=== Tropical Storm Lucy ===
- Tropical storm (SSHWS)
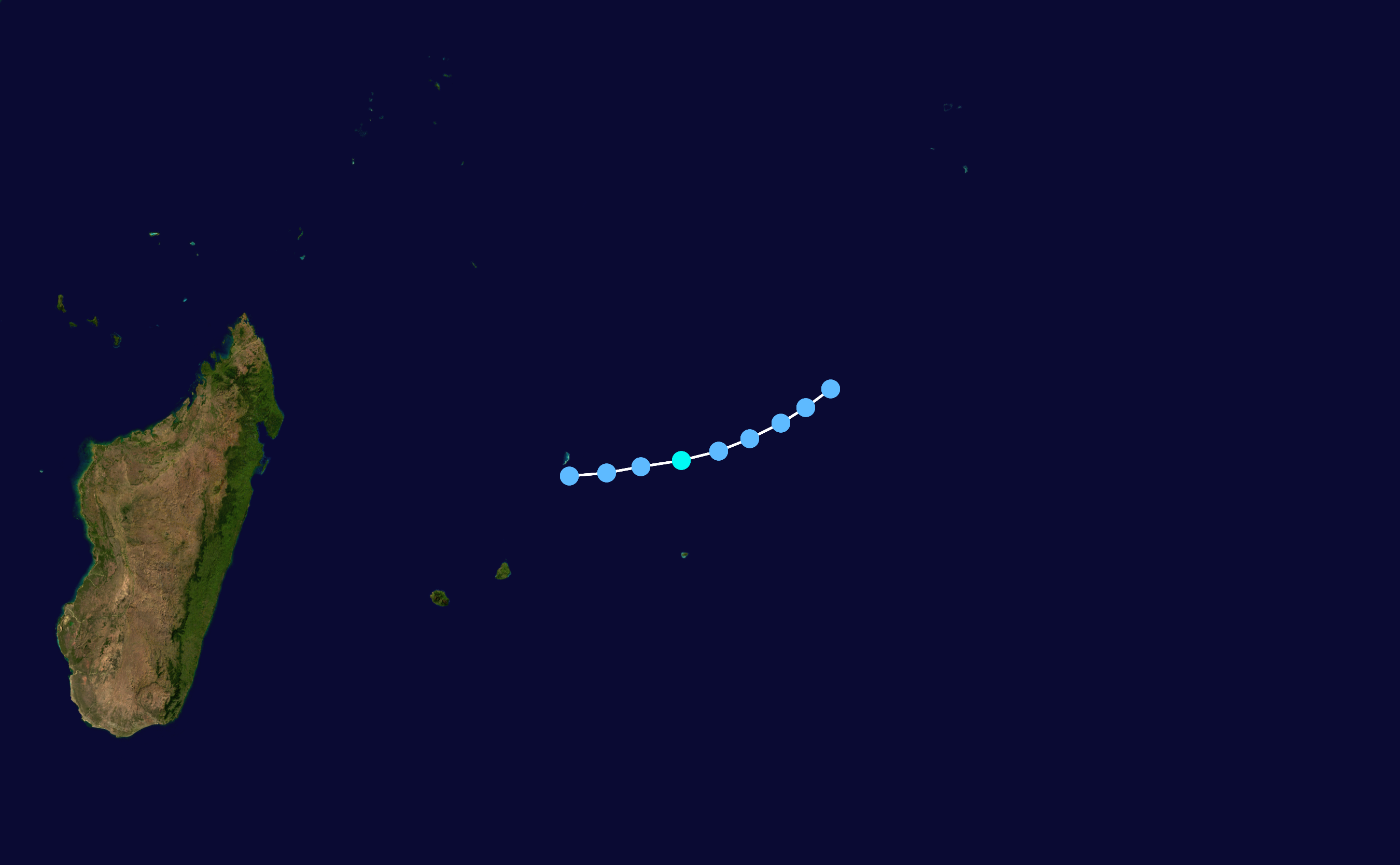
- Duration: March 17 – March 22
- Peak intensity: 65 km/h (40 mph) (1-min);

Passed near St. Brandon.

=== Cyclone Maud ===
- Category 1 tropical cyclone (SSHWS)
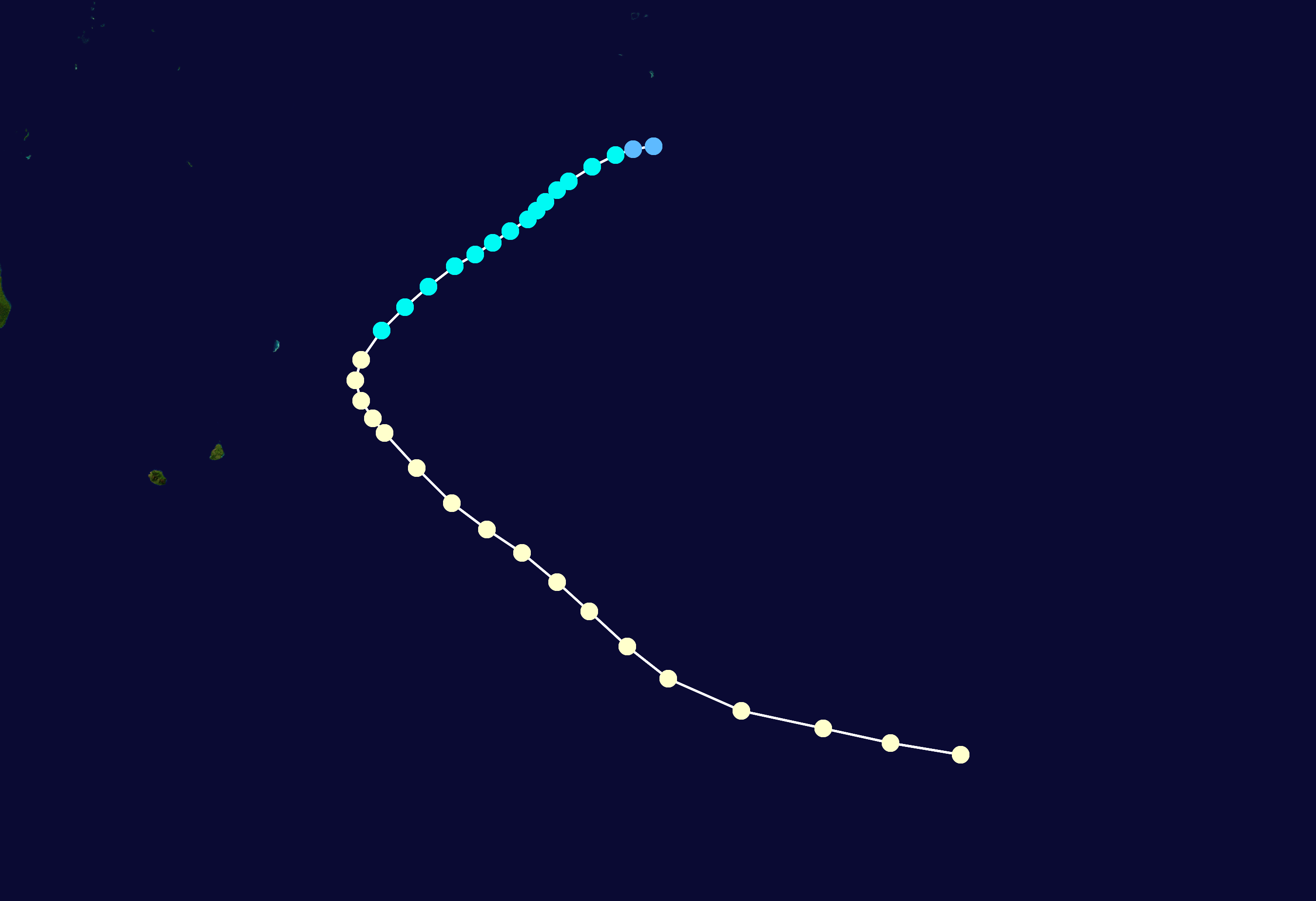
- Duration: March 30 – April 11
- Peak intensity: 140 km/h (85 mph) (1-min);

Existed south of Diego Garcia and executed a loop at the end of its track.

=== Other storms ===
A tropical depression briefly existed in the northeast portion of the basin from January 19–21. At the time, it was part of the neighboring Australian basin, east of 80°. On January 22, a system named Emily existed briefly west of that general region.

== See also ==
- Atlantic hurricane seasons: 1961, 1962
- Eastern Pacific hurricane seasons: 1961, 1962
- Western Pacific typhoon seasons: 1961, 1962
- North Indian Ocean cyclone seasons: 1961, 1962
