= Amy (disambiguation) =

Amy is a feminine given name.

Amy or AMY may also refer to:

== Comics ==
- Amy (comic strip), created by Harry Mace in 1962
- Amy (The Walking Dead), a fictional character in the comic book and television series The Walking Dead

== Computing and technology ==
- AMY (scientific instrument), a particle detector used at the TRISTAN collider
- Amy (video game), a 2012 survival horror video game
- Atari AMY, a single-chip synthesizer originally designed at Atari

== Film and television ==
- Amy (1981 film), an American film directed by Vincent McEveety
- Amy (1984 film), a British television film based on the life of aviator Amy Johnson
- Amy (1997 film), an Australian film directed by Nadia Tass
- Amy (2015 film), a British documentary based on the life of Amy Winehouse
- "Amy" (Doctors), a 2004 television episode
- "Amy" (Not Going Out), a 2009 television episode

== Music ==
- Amy Records, an American record label
- Amy (soundtrack), from the 2015 film, by Antônio Pinto and Amy Winehouse
- "Amy" (song), by Green Day from ¡Dos!, 2012
- "Amy", a song by Chase Atlantic from Lost in Heaven, 2024
- "Amy", a song by Elton John from Honky Château, 1972
- "Amy", a song by Timeflies from After Hours, 2014
- "Amy", a song by Yuna and Masego from Rouge, 2019
- "Amy", an alternative name for "If U Seek Amy", a song by Britney Spears from Circus, 2008

== Places ==
- Amy, Kansas, US
- Amy, Mississippi, US
- Amy, Missouri, US
- Amy, Oise, France, a commune

== Ships ==
- Amy (ship, 1872) - Australian brig, wrecked at Thirroul, NSW, Australia in February 1898

== Other uses ==
- Amy (demon), in demonology, a goetic demon
- AMY Awards, or the Australian Interactive Media Industry Association Awards
- Ambatomainty Airport (IATA airport code)
- Amberley railway station (National Rail code)
- List of storms named Amy

== See also ==
- Ami (disambiguation)
- Amie (disambiguation)
- Ammi (disambiguation)
