= Amie =

Amie may refer to:

- Amie, an alternate spelling of the female personal name Amy
- AMIE, the Associate Member of the Institution of Engineers, a professional certification given by India's Institution of Engineers
- "Amie" (song), song from the 1972 album Bustin' Out by Pure Prairie League
- "Amie", a song by artist Damien Rice
- Amie, daughter of Massasoit and wife to Tispaquin
- Amie Fern, a party member character from the video game Neverwinter Nights 2
- Anglican Mission in England, a UK religious charity
- AMIE (Articulate Medical Intelligence Explorer), an automated healthcare diagnostic chatbot

== See also ==
- Belle Amie (disambiguation)
- Ami (disambiguation)
- Ammi (disambiguation)
- Amy (disambiguation)
