= Amy Carlson (disambiguation) =

Amy Carlson may refer to:

- Amy Carlson (born 1968), American actress
- Amy Carlson (1975–2021), American cult leader

== See also ==
- Amy (disambiguation)
- Carlson (disambiguation)
