= Fat Amy =

Fat Amy may refer to:

- Lockheed Martin F-35 Lightning II, U.S. stealth jet fighter, nicknamed "Fat Amy"
- Patricia "Fat Amy" Hobart, a fictional character from the Pitch Perfect franchise portrayed by Rebel Wilson
- Fat Amy, former name of the Bob Guiney Band, the band of Bob Guiney

== See also ==
- "Fat Amy Challenge", 2022 season 9 episode of Man v. Food
- Fat (disambiguation)
- Amy (disambiguation)
