= Amy (ship, 1872) =

Sailing vessel used in New South Wales, Australia

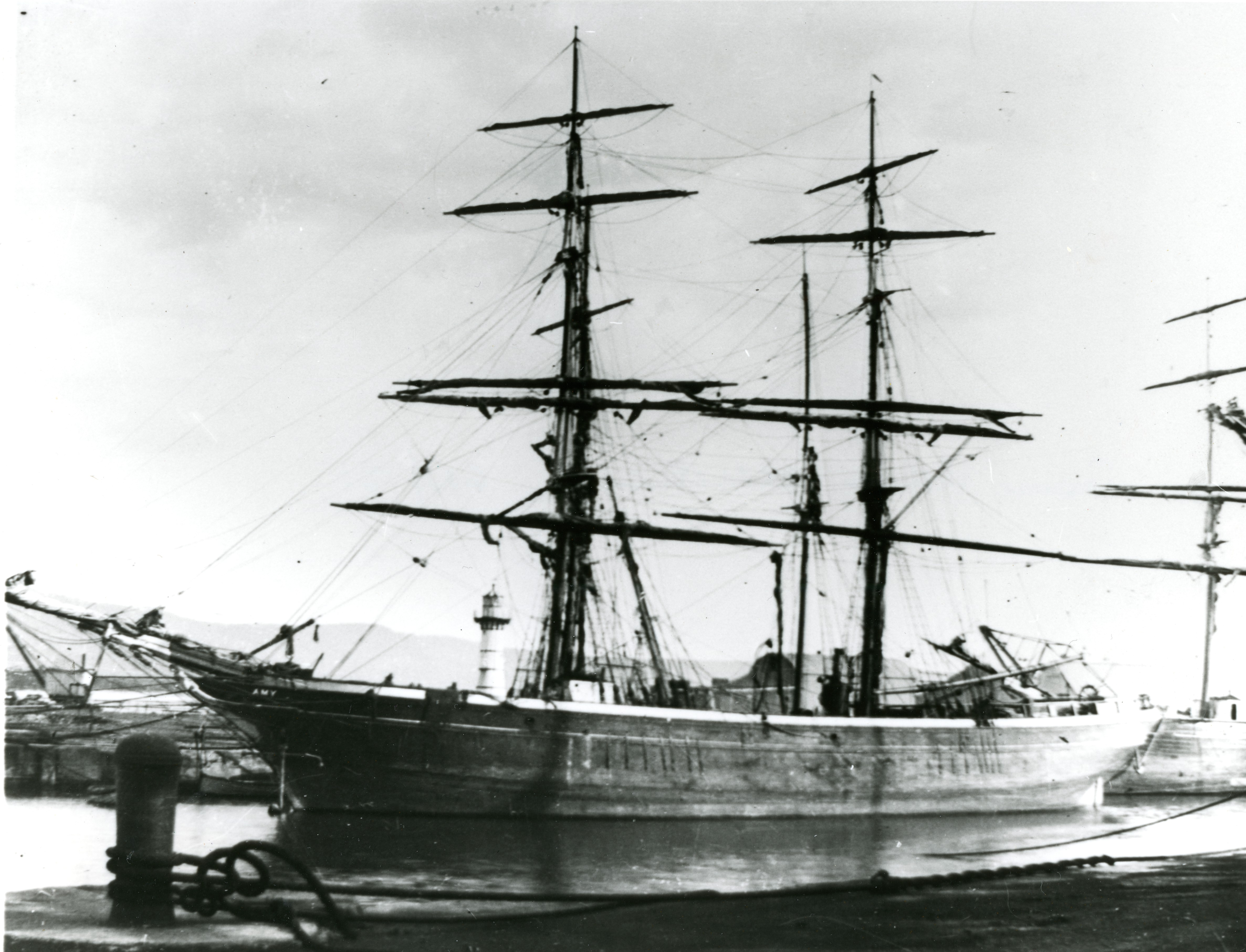
- Amy at Belmore Basin (Wollongong City Libraries)

History
- Name: Amy
- Owner: James Cox (1872–1880); Warburton & Sons (1880–1898)
- Port of registry: (Australia) Sydney
- Builder: Thomas Davis, Terrigal
- Launched: 1872
- Maiden voyage: January 1873
- Out of service: 13 February 1898
- Identification: Official ID #64403
- Fate: Wrecked, 13 February 1898

General characteristics
- Type: brig
- Tonnage: 220 GRT
- Length: 107 ft (33 m)
- Beam: 26 ft (7.9 m)
- Depth of hold: 11 ft (3.4 m)
- Sail plan: brig
- Boats & landing craft carried: 2
- Crew: 8

Amy was a brig used in the coastal shipping trade of New South Wales. On 13 February 1898, while working as a sixty-miler collier, she was wrecked on a sandbar off the beach at Thirroul, during a gale. All her crew died. There is a memorial at Thirroul Beach.

== Description ==
Amy was built by Thomas Davis at Terrigal in 1872. He was one of the Davis family of shipbuilders, who between them ran eight shipyards and built over 300 wooden vessels up to 1913.

She was 107 feet long, 26 feet across the beam, her hold 11 feet deep, and 220 tons gross capacity. She was constructed of hardwood timber, with kauri pine decking, and had a carved figurehead. She was rigged as a brig, with square-rigged sails on two masts. Like many sailing vessels of the time, she was fitted with a small steam donkey engine that powered her winch and pumps.

Her compliment was eight in total, consisting of a captain, a mate, a cook, a winchman / donkeyman, and four able seamen.

Her identification number was 64403. In 1898, she was insured for £1,000.

== Service history and incidents ==
=== Inter-colonial trade ===
A report from late January 1873 mentions that, "The fine new colonial brig Amy, belonging to Mr. Cox, will leave forthwith for Adelaide." In October 1874, she was carrying a load of potatoes from the Duck River, in Tasmania, to Sydney. In August and December 1876, carried cargoes of sawn timber from 'Wangaroa' (Whangaroa), in New Zealand. She carried a cargo of wheat from Port Pirie to Sydney, in 1877.

=== Coastal coal trade ===
In June 1880, Amy was purchased by Wartburton & Sons, of Pyrmont, Sydney, to replace their schooner, Lady Emma, which had been wrecked at North Head. and was thereafter a coastal collier, on the run between Newcastle and Sydney. She was carrying coal from Wollongong, in 1894. In 1896, she was carrying coal from the ports of Wollongong and Bellambi.

=== Collisions ===
==== City of Grafton (1886) ====
Just after 9 p.m. in the evening of 9 February 1886, Amy collided with the fore-and-aft schooner-rigged iron paddle steamer City of Grafton, near Miller's Point, in Sydney Harbour. Amy was inbound, with a cargo of coal from Newcastle. City of Grafton was outbound for Grafton.

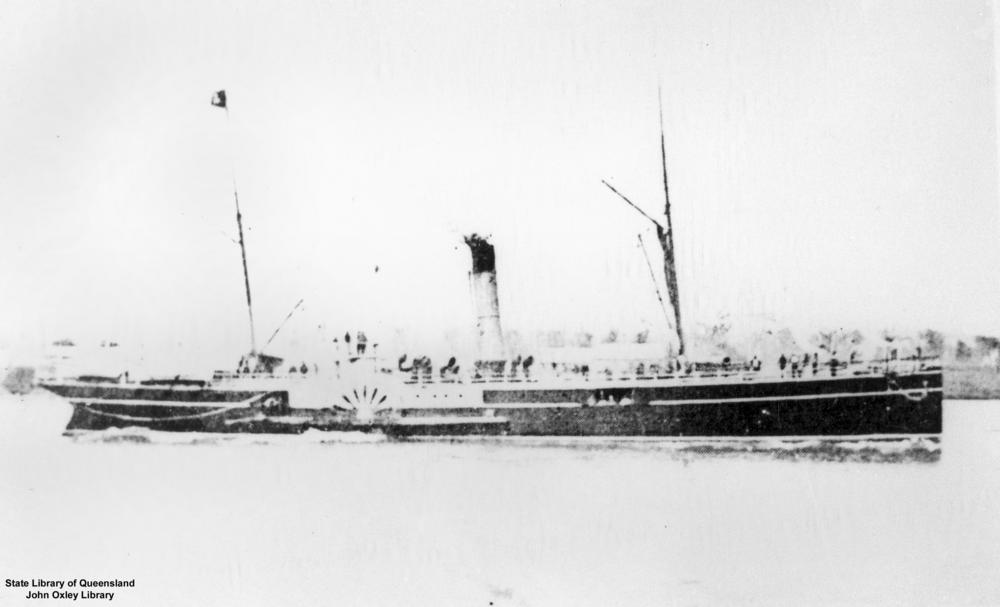
City of Grafton

Amy lost her jib boom, when she struck the much larger City of Grafton, between the paddle box and the stern, carrying away the rail and two of the paddle steamer's boats. The steamer lowered a boat to inspect the damage; both ships' hulls were undamaged. After her crew failed to find the missing boats, City of Grafton continued on her voyage. Amy declined assistance and then anchored in Johnson's Bay.

There was a Marine Board inquiry. The taking of evidence was completed on 1 March 1886. The board found no grounds to bring a charge of default—negligence, failure of duty regarding collisions, or misconduct—against any party.

==== Dingadee (1888) ====
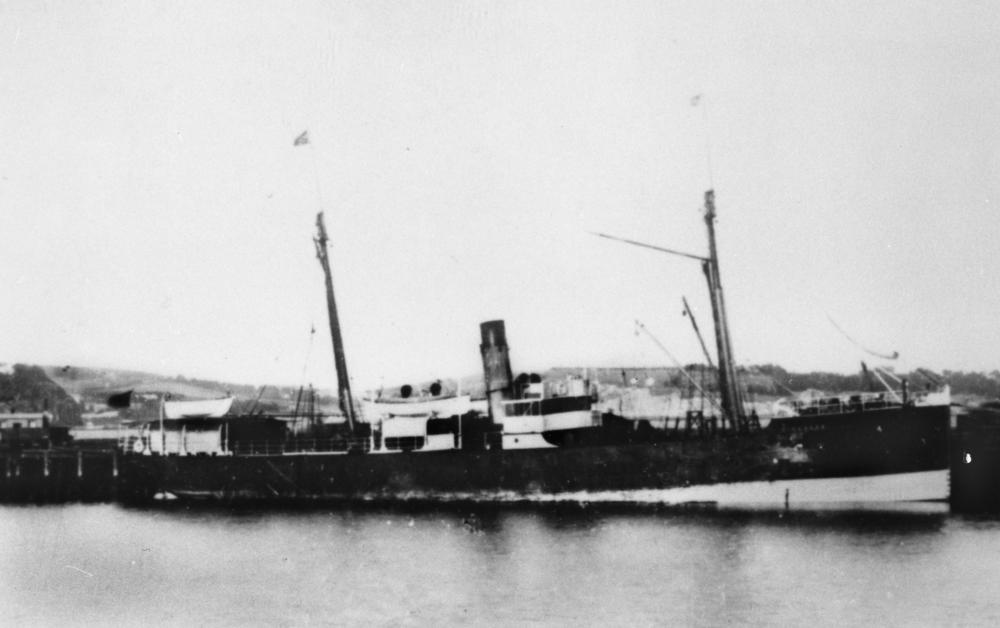
Dingadee

Amy was involved in another collision, this time with an A.U.S.N steamer, Dingadee, on 6 March 1888. Amy was in Darling Harbour, getting underway, and being towed by a tug, when Dingadee rounded Millers Point. The vessels tried to avoid collision, but Dingadee struck Amy just behind her foremast rigging. Damage to Amy was described as "pretty considerable", and the force of impact such that "it caused her to list, which nearly had the effect of throwing the crew off their legs", but nobody was injured. The Marine Board found that Captain James McKee of Amy had been at fault—Amy had been on the wrong side of the fairway, when Dingadee's masts first became visible—however, Captain McKee received only a reprimand.

==== 'A southern steam collier' (1895) ====
On 29 November 1895, in Wooloomooloo Bay, a southern steam collier fouled Amy's rigging and "carried away part of her foremast".

=== Accidents ===
==== Seaman's fall (1883) ====
On 22 December 1883, while Amy was off Nobby's, a seaman fell from the rigging, landing on his head. Amy returned to port immediately. The seaman "sustained concussion of the brain, and has remained insensible in the hospital ever since."

==== Captain injured (1888) ====
Amy's captain "James McGee" [sic] (McKee) survived a serious accident aboard the vessel, on 17 November 1888. Amy was in the river port of Hexham, and a cargo of iron rails was being unloaded. The Captain was guiding a load of rails out of the hold, when the fingers of one his hands became caught in a hoisting block. When he tried to use the other hand, to extricate his trapped hand, it too became caught in the block. He was then "hoisted about eight feet above the deck, from which height he fell upon his face and hands into the hold, striking the rails with great force in his descent." Partially-conscious, with many lacerations, and with badly crushed fingers, he was placed on a passing river steamer and taken to Raymond Terrace for medical treatment.

=== Near misses ===
==== Wollongong (1887) ====
Amy was approaching the harbour of Wollongong, at around 6 p.m. on 19 September 1887. The port authorities had raised the red ball signal, to indicate that it was unsafe to attempt to enter the port, due to the large seas that were running at the time. "Captain McGee" [sic] (McKee) raised a flag requesting that a tug tow Amy into port, but the pilot, Thompson, would not let a tug go out because of the conditions. Amy's captain brought her into the harbour under sail, at risk of going onto the rocks. Aware of the risk of being wrecked, the crew had stripped off their clothing to be ready to go into the water. The captain was reported to have said that he had not seen the red ball signal from outside the harbour, or otherwise he would not have entered the port. As one report stated, "All's well that ends well!", but it had been a risky, if skilful, piece of navigation.

==== North Head ====
It was reported that the pilot boat had assisted Amy at North Head, where she had been "plucked from the rocks ... just in time".

==== Newcastle (1895) ====
Amy was under tow by Energy, in September 1895, when the towline broke while she was off the Big Ben reef, near Nobbys, at the mouth of the Hunter River. She had a narrow escape, but was taken in tow by a tug and safely entered port.

=== Groundings ===
==== Near Lake Macquarie (1884) ====
In the morning of 27 June 1884, Amy was en route between Sydney and Newcastle, when she ran aground on a shoal near the entrance to Lake Macquarie. She was freed and continued to Newcastle.

==== Near Cronulla (1896) ====
During the night of Tuesday 9 June 1896, Amy was carrying a load of 320 tons of coal from Wollongong to Botany. There were what was described as "incessant rain squalls along the coast." By midnight, visibility was poor and the lighthouse at South Head had not been sighted. The Cape Baily Light did not exist at that time. North of Cronulla, the direction of the coast line changes gradually, from generally north-south to generally east-west, before once again becoming generally north-south. Amy was steered to the same heading as she had followed many times before, but unknowingly the ship was closer to the coast than prudent. The swell was from the east.

During the subsequent inquiry, Captain McKee stated that he had gone below, and upon returning to the deck had seen land, which he at first took to be Botany. A lead line was cast and the brig was found to be in 20 fathoms of water. Soon, it was in only nine fathoms, at which point both anchors were dropped, but it was too late to avoid grounding.

At around 3 a.m. on Wednesday, 10 June 1896, Amy ran aground. The location was described as being about "a mile from the hotel", corresponding in modern day naming to the northern part of Wanda Beach or the southern part of Greenhills Beach. Using the anchored lines an unsuccessful attempt was made to free the vessel. Waves were breaking over the vessel, and fearing for the lives of his crew, the Captain ordered the crew into two boats. The boats stood safely away from the shore, near where Amy had lodged, until daylight. As the sea was too rough to safely reboard Amy while she was grounded, they commenced to row to the shelter of Port Hacking, where they safely landed at around 9 a.m. At 11 a.m., a telegram arrived in Sydney reading, "Amy went ashore on Cronulla Beach at 3 a.m. in a thick fog. She can be got off if assistance sent promptly."

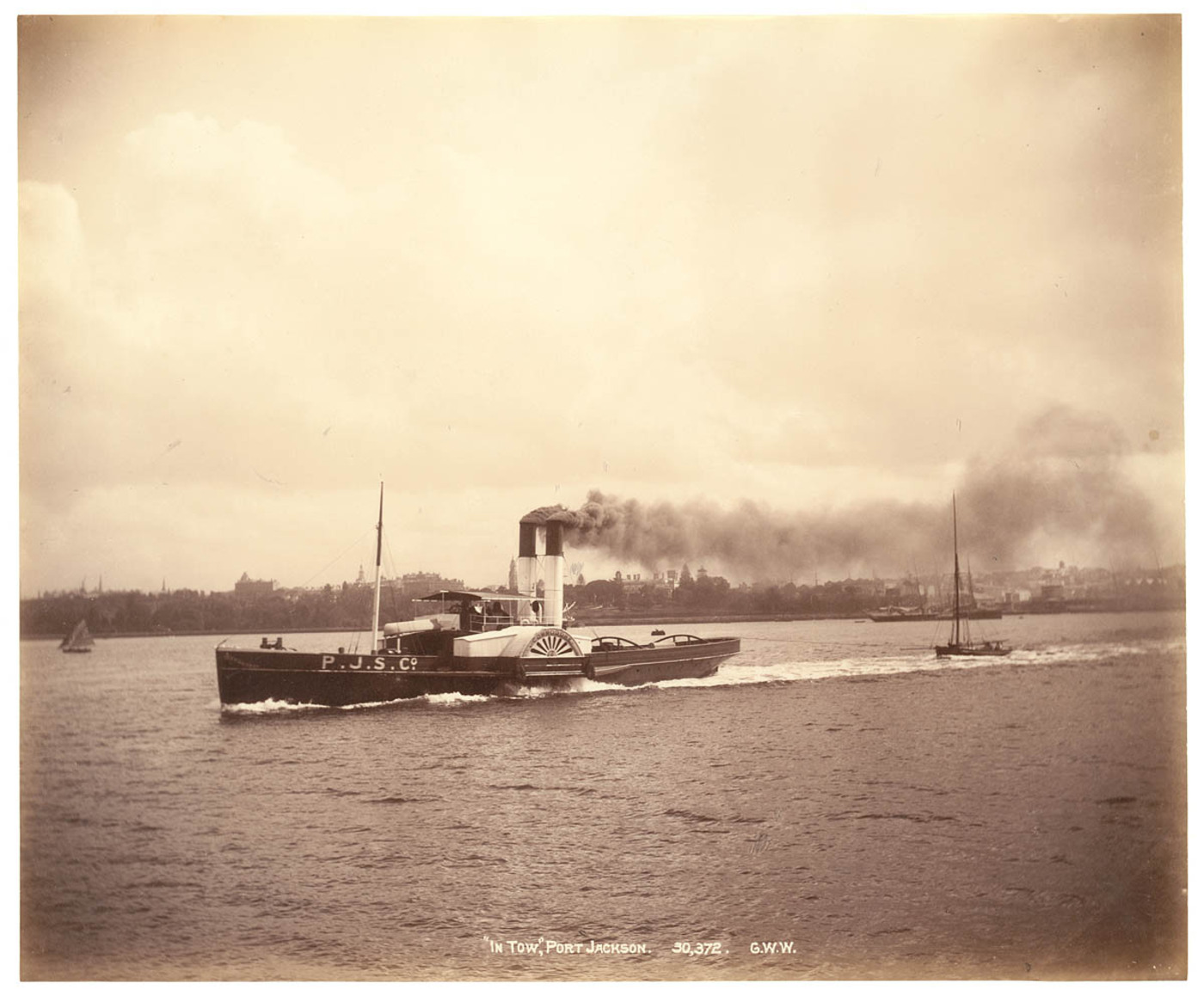
Commodore one of the vessels that recovered Amy, taken c.1892.

The tug, Commodore, and the pilot vessel, Captain Cook, left Sydney Heads, around midday, reaching Amy at around 1 p.m. The tug Swansea also headed south. They found the vessel abandoned, with all sails set, and bumping heavily in the surf. Four men boarded Amy, and found 3 foot of water in the hold, indicating that Amy was leaking. A tow line each was then attached from both Commodore and Captain Cook and after about half an hour, Amy came free. There ensued a delay of around one and a half hours, while steam was raised to power the steam winch to lift Amy's anchors. During that time—about half an hour after Amy was freed—Amy's crew arrived in two boats from Port Hacking. The crew started to work the pumps. In tow by the two tugs, Amy arrived at Pyrmont, at 7:30 p.m., with her pumps having been run continuously during the trip.

There was a subsequent Marine Board inquiry, but no further action was taken as the board "were satisfied that the captain and crew had done all in their power to save the brig."

Having survived the grounding, Amy went into the dock of David Drake at Balmain, and her copper was removed, she was re-caulked, re-treenailed, and new copper was fitted. After 1896, the brig had two other visits to the same dock, the last being in December 1897.

== Wreck (1898) ==
=== Wreck and rescue attempts ===
Amy left Wollongong bound for Sydney, with a cargo of 310 tons of coal, at around 7 a.m. on Sunday, 13 February 1898. She carried a crew of eight. Initially conditions were fine, but at around 11 a.m. a strong south-easterly gale sprang up unexpectedly.

Captain Bray, of the schooner Garron, lost sight of Amy, at 1 p.m., when the brig was about a mile off Bulli Point and on a course away from the coast, "in the teeth of a gale". Why Amy had taken so long to reach Bulli cannot be known, but one theory is that she had turned south for a time, to assist the crew of the schooner, Malcolm.

Thirroul Beach, at low tide, looking north, toward the site of the wreck.

Later that afternoon, Amy went aground off Thirroul Beach, close to the mouth of Flanagan's Creek. Sources vary, stating 4 p.m., 4:30 p.m., 5 p.m., or 6 p.m. as the time of the grounding. There was a strong E.S.E. wind blowing and it was raining heavily. If Bray's report is correct, Amy had made little progress north, but her crew had struggled to keep away from the coast, for at least three hours, before losing their battle with the gale.

Amy was lengthwise to the beach and tilted over, with waves washing over the entire length of her hull. It was reported that between waves, Amy partially righted herself, and then was bumped closer to the shore by each large wave, finally becoming firmly lodged about 100 yards off shore. Reportedly, witnesses stated that Amy came to rest on or against a sandbar, and did not wash over the bar; it was there, still some distance from the shore, that the vessel was "shattered". The seas were described as 'mountains high'. The current was to the south. It was an ebbing tide.

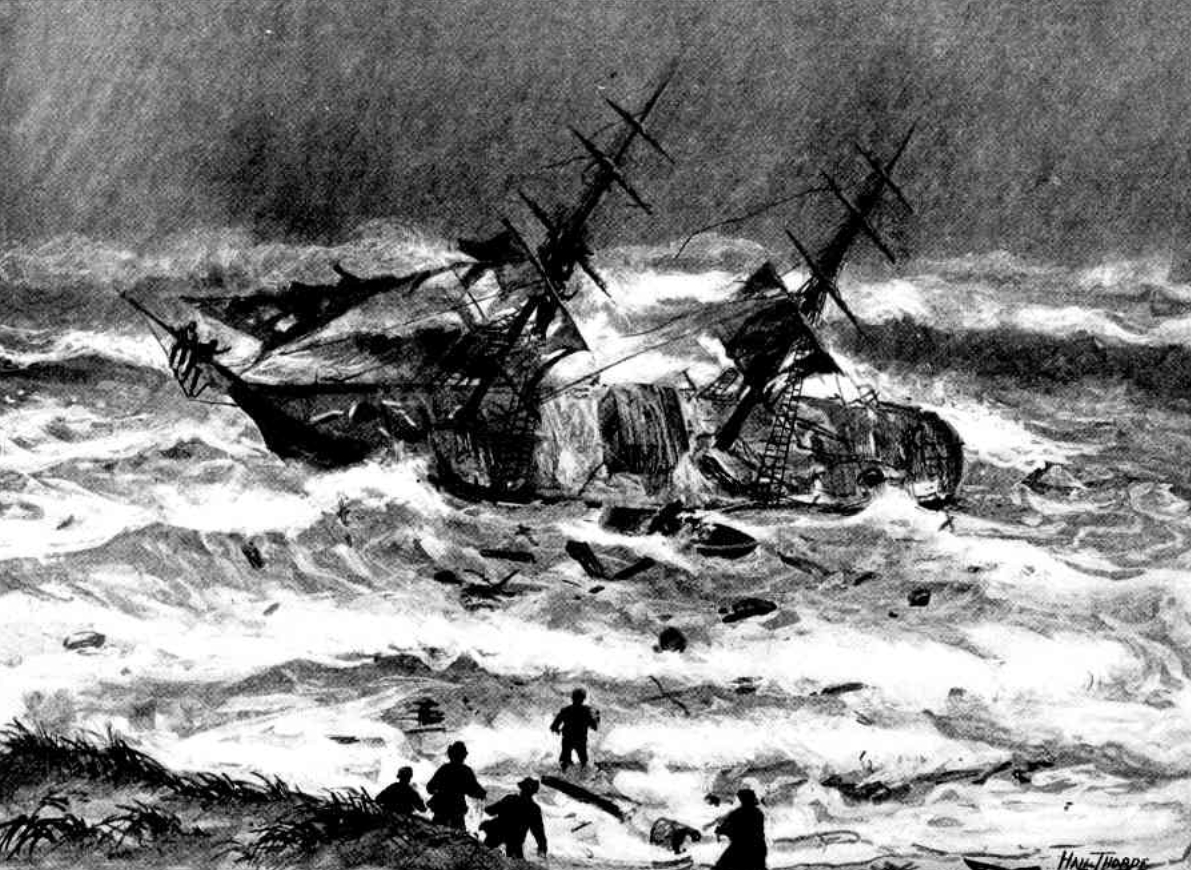
Amy aground off Thirroul Beach.

A local farmer, Mr McCauley, and his two sons, accompanied by Mr T. Kelly, ran to the beach to see if assistance could be given. Another person who rushed to the beach, was Charles Sefton, station master at Thirroul, who had noticed the masts of a ship in distress at, he later said, around 5:30 p.m.. He arrived after McCauley and Kelly. He saw a piece of timber bearing the name Amy and one of the brig's boats wash ashore.

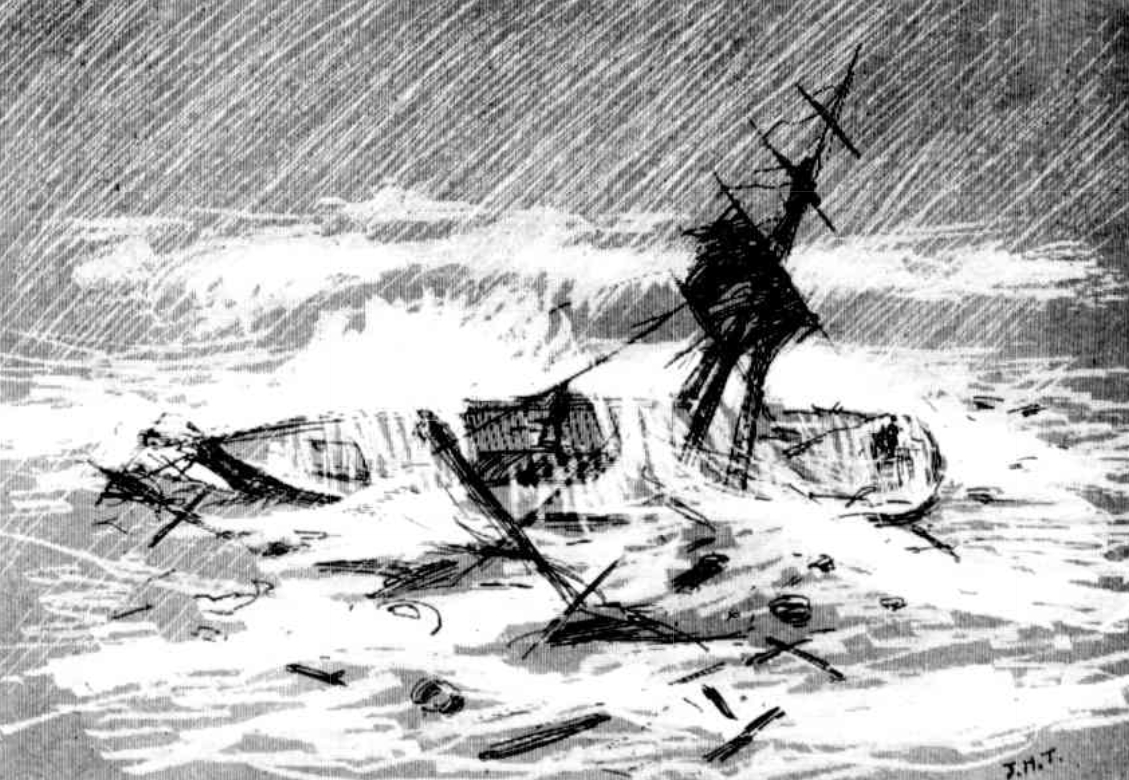
Amy breaking up.

Amy's mainsail and fore-lower topsail were set, but had been "ripped to shreds". Members of the crew were sighted on the stricken vessel. One sailor launched a boat, but it was soon swamped. He was able to support himself on a floating plank. A rescuer, Thomas Kelly, attached by a rope to the shore, could not reach him, due to the length of the rope, and the sailor was drawn back out. After being washed to and fro—various reports stated for half an hour or for three quarters of an hour—he disappeared. Kelly was injured, by being struck by floating wreckage, during the attempted rescue. Other men—Sefton states three men—were seen in parts of the brig's rigging, lashing themselves to it. When the rigging fell, the men were seen to fall with it, and were never sighted again.

The vessel broke up rapidly; reports say within half an hour of the grounding. Charles Sefton described the sequence as follows, "the bulwarks went first—starboard side; the deck burst out, and the vessel appeared to part amidships, the inside of the bottom being plainly visible; the masts went over and the men on them disappeared". He reported that two men on the bowsprit then tried to crawl along the bulwark, but were washed overboard by a huge wave; one swam strongly, but was overwhelmed by wreckage, when close to shore. Sefton said that, by that time, all that was visible of Amy was the funnel of her donkey engine.

The manager of the Bulli mine sent men with ropes to the beach, but too late to save lives. With little to be done to help the crew, some tried to pull loose wreckage out of the surf to reduce the hazards for any survivors trying to make for shore. Witnesses later opined that most, if not all, of the crew had died after being struck by wreckage in the surf.

A crowd of around one hundred people had gathered on the beach, but conditions were such that little could be done to assist. All the crew died, and one who came onto the beach to lend aid, Thomas Birch, an employee of the Bulli coke works, also died, after suffering a heart attack.

Within two hours, the vessel was a total wreck, with only the ribs of her hull emerging from the waves, as the tide became lower.

=== Wreckage, flotsam and bodies ===
The wind changed direction, to become nearly due easterly, at around midnight when it also moderated significantly. The beach was strewn with wreckage and a large portion of it was reported to have lodged near to the mouth of what was then known locally as 'the Second Creek'—as distinct from Flanagan's Creek, where Amy went aground and was wrecked—but the bottom of the hull stayed close to where Amy had run aground. ('Second Creek' had a lagoon, suggesting that it is an older name for Hewitts Creek.) On Monday, 14 February, one of her lifeboats washed up, in an undamaged condition, and her masts also came ashore. Police began patrolling the shoreline at daybreak that day.

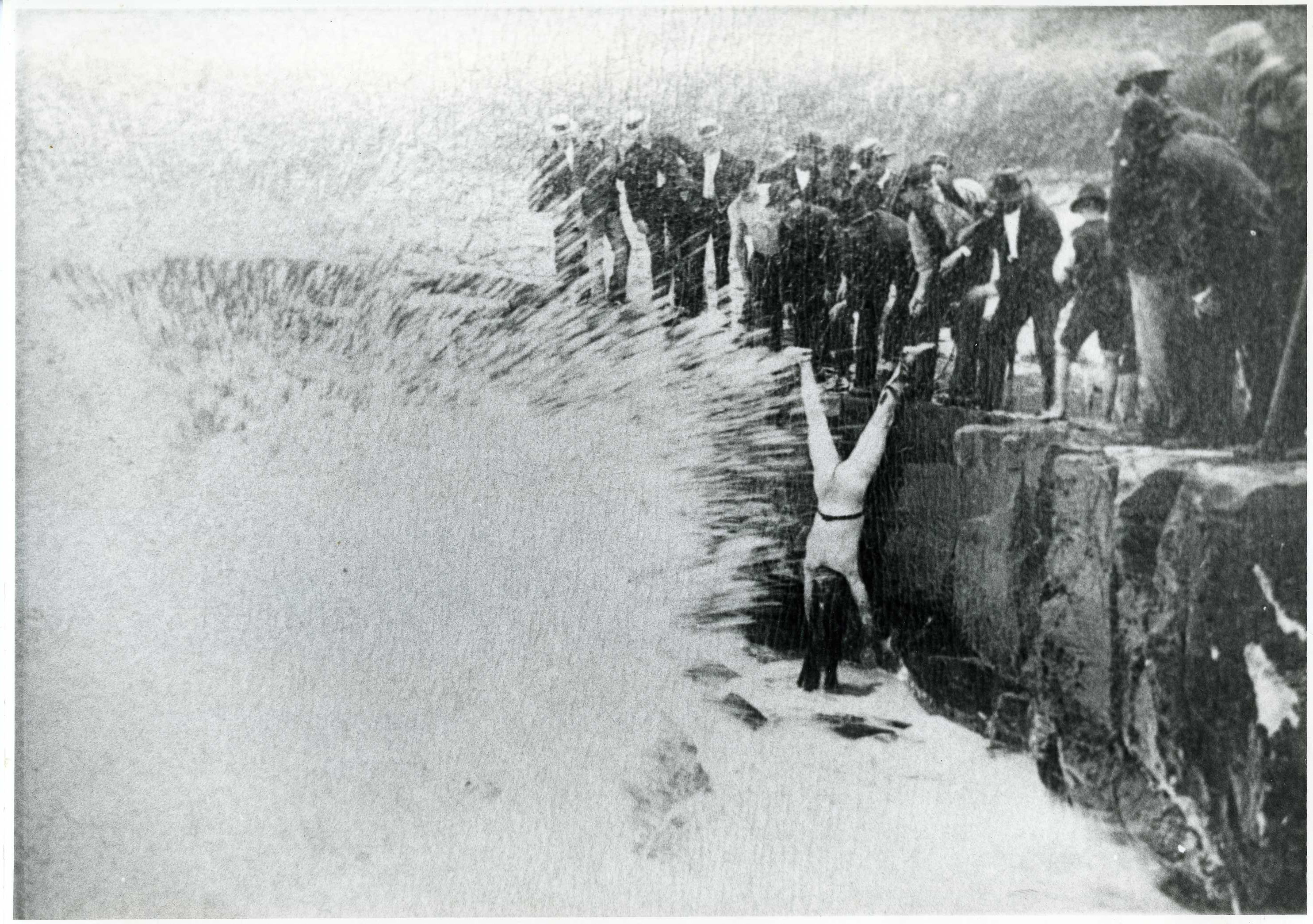
Recovery of the body of one of Amy's crew at 'Thirroul South' Photographer: Allen Charles Sefton (Wollongong City Libraries) The photograph was taken on either 14 or 15 February 1898. The power of the swell is apparent, even after the worst of the storm had subsided.

The first body recovered, at around 11 a.m. or 12 noon, on Monday, 14 February, was that of Captain McKee. It was found by Patrick Murphy, who was a wheeler at the Bulli coal mine, floating in the breakers—variously reported as a quarter of a mile or 150 yards south of the wreck—on McCauley's Beach. The body was devoid of any clothing, had head injuries, and was badly bruised. There is a photograph of the body of one of Amy's crew being recovered at 'Thirroul South', taken by Allen Charles Sefton, station master at Thirroul. The photograph shows a location with a rock platform.

During the morning of Tuesday, 15 February, "several portions of a human body were picked up on the beach," and a body was sighted floating in the surf. Later that day, at around 2 or 3 p.m, the body of the cook, Jacobson, washed up; it was naked. Two more bodies were seen floating in the sea, on 15 February, but were not close enough to the shore to be recovered. A number of letters washed ashore on that day.

Rocks at the southern end of Thirroul Beach, which separate it from McCauleys Beach, looking south toward Sandon Point.

A third body was recovered, during the afternoon of 15 February, on the beach near Austinmer. Although the body "was not disfigured in any way", it was not positively identified; it was supposed to be either that of Olsen, the winchman, or the mate. Also on the afternoon of 15 February, more human remains—part of a stomach—were reported as being found on rocks to the south of the wreck.

The tug, Carbine, cruised in the vicinity of the wreck, but did not find anything of significance. Rigging entangled on the mooring buoys of Bulli Jetty, at first thought to be from the missing schooner, Malcolm, was found to be from Amy. A 'spar' thought to be from Malcolm was identified as being a piece of Bellambi Jetty.

The search for bodies was hampered by the large amount of seaweed that had washed up on the beach during the storm, and masses of seaweed were also floating in the water.

On Thursday, 17 February, an inspection of the wreckage was made by Mr Warburton, of the owners, Warburton & Sons, accompanied by "experts in shipping and ship-building". It was to gather evidence for the inquest.

On Friday, 18 February, at around 11 a.m., human remains—consisting of a head and what was described as a skeleton, without the arms and legs—washed up, and were identified as "Number 4". The bones of an arm and some other small bones were found later that day. The body could not be recognised. It would be the fourth, and last, more or less complete, body found.

By Friday, much of the floating seaweed had gone out to sea, taking with it, it was feared, some of the bodies of the crew. Human remains and small bones were reported as being washed up as late as 21 February.

It was reported that the police intended to patrol the beach for another eight days, starting from Monday, 21 February, after which they would resume normal duties. People were still visiting the beach in significant numbers, to see what was left of Amy. Part of the reason for the patrols was to monitor for pilfering of items washed ashore from the wreck. A report stated that, "Thieving is being carried on to a considerable extent. Ropes, canvas, oilskin coats, etc., are disappearing very fast." The end of the police patrols roughly corresponded with the recommencement of the inquest proceedings. Later, in March 1898, two men were charged. One man with stealing a rope and a coal basket from the wreck, and the other, Thomas Kelly, with being in possession of a coal basket "reasonably supposed to be stolen". Both men were found guilty and received fines, with costs.

=== Those lost aboard Amy ===
==== The crew ====
Accounting for the crew of Amy proved not to be straightforward. There was doubt about whether the crew list, dated 24 January 1898, was completely accurate, a view even held by the ship's owners. The owners stated that, on 10 February, two of the crew had been discharged; since those two would have been replaced by 13 February, at least two names on the 24 January list were incorrect, by the time of the wrecking. A second crew list, which differs significantly from the earlier one, and includes eight names, was published in the NSW Police Gazette, in March 1898. The confused situation was complicated further, by most of the crew being of Scandinavian or German origin—with various spellings, misspellings, or Anglicisations, of their first names and surnames, and potentially their aliases— and by the absence, in some cases, of any locally-resident family.

Four bodies were recovered, but only three were identified at the time of their burials; Captain James McKee, John Jacobsen, the cook, and William Johnstone, the mate, who was initially misidentified as Olsen/Olssen, the winchman. Apart from McKee, in fact, it seems that none of the recovered bodies had been correctly identified, at the time of their burial.

==== The 'woman and child' ====
It was reported that the captain's wife and child had been on board Amy, when the brig left Wollongong, and there were multiple reports of a woman and child being sighted during the wrecking. One report stated that a sailor tried to swim with the woman to the shore but they were struck by wreckage and disappeared. A child's boot—fitting a 7 or 8 year old—was reported as washed up with flotsam from the wreck.

Captain James McKee was married, and his wife's name was Jane. They had three children—James (Junior), May, and Rose—with the family residing in the Sydney suburb of Leichhardt. Captain McKee's widow, their two daughters, and their son, all attended his funeral, and Mrs McKee lived until June 1917. If there were a woman and child aboard, they were not from the Captain McKee's family.

Some reports treated the presence of a woman and child on board as being a false rumour. Charles Sefton, who provided a quite detailed, sequential, contemporaneous description of the brig's breaking up, to the Illawarra Mercury, mentions seeing only five men aboard. The earlier report of the sailor who tried to launch a boat, brings the number to, at most, six survivors sighted after Amy grounded, all being men. No bodies of a woman and child were ever found, but neither were all the bodies of Amy's crew. With some uncertainty existing about who actually was aboard the vessel, the reported sightings of the woman and child remain unexplained.

=== Other losses and damage ===
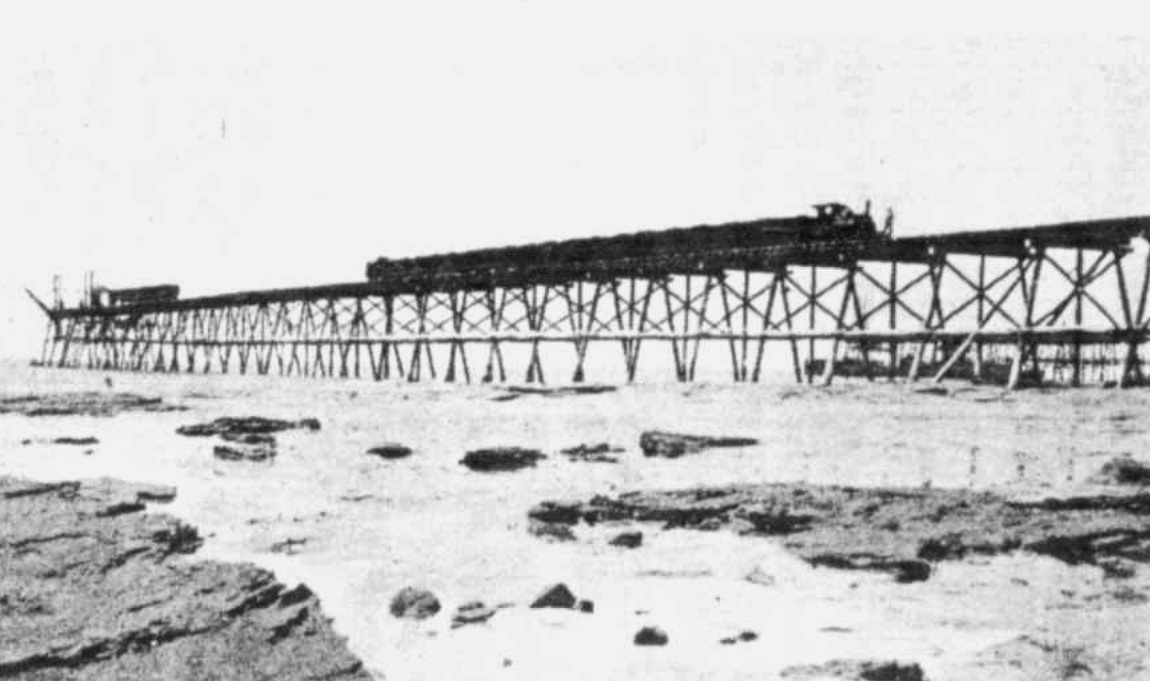
Bellambi Jetty, before the storm damage.

The gale that claimed Amy also destroyed the Bellambi Coal Co.'s jetty at Port Bellambi. 500 feet of the jetty, 27 seven-ton coal wagons, the coal chutes, and the winch and its donkey engine were washed into the sea. The jetty was so badly damaged that it was never repaired nor ever used again.

Another small vessel carrying coal from Wollongong to Sydney, the brigantine, Malcolm, (sometimes erroneously called a schooner) went down with all hands. All that was found of her were two lifebuoys bearing her name and a plank, found at the end of February, washed up on Garie Beach. A human foot and a shirt, found on 'Lilyvale Beach', on Sunday 20 February, were thought to be from Malcolm's crew. but it was impossible to know for certain. Initially believed to have sunk near Bulli Jetty, a view formed that Malcolm had foundered in deep water. Her wreck has never been found.

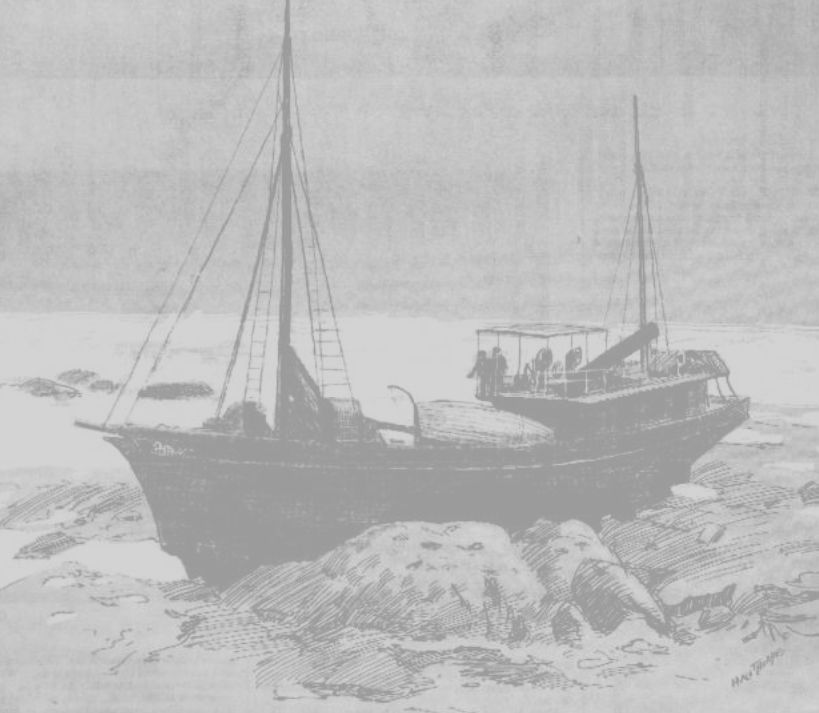
Marion Fenwick, on the rocks after the gale.

The schooner, Garron, the last vessel to sight Amy at sea, was damaged and had an extremely narrow escape, only due to the assistance of the pilot steamer, Captain Cook.

A small wooden coastal auxiliary steamer, Marion Fenwick, went ashore on a rock shelf near Marley Beach—while her Captain was attempting to beach her—without loss of life. Damaged beyond repair, Marion Fenwick was dissassembed on site. Her cargo of cheese, from Bodalla, survived, and was later put up for sale.

Other ships, bound for Sydney or Newcastle, met great difficulties due to the storm. The extreme weather led to severe flooding on the Hunter, Nepean, and Hawkesbury Rivers, and on Araluen Creek. Cataract Dam overflowed and was damaged.

== Aftermath ==
=== Burials ===
Two separate and very different funerals were held on the same day, Wednesday, 16 February 1898.

Captain James McKee's body was buried at Rookwood Cemetery (also known then as Necropolis), after a funeral procession from his home to the cemetery, via Petersham station. His funeral was well-attended. The coffin was draped in the Union Jack, and there were many floral tributes. Among the attendees were various officials of Warburton & Sons, owners of Amy and Garron, who had employed McKee for over 25 years, and numerous masters of other vessels. His six pallbearers were all masters of vessels. There are two death certificates for James McKee; the first from the Woonona district—it would have allowed his burial—and a later second one from the Marine district.

On the same day, a much smaller funeral procession—a wagonette carrying the undertaker and bearing two coffins, and a buggy carrying a new widow and two others—made its way from Thirroul to the Presbyterian section of Bulli Cemetery. There the bodies of two of the crew were interred.

One of the bodies buried at Bulli was that of Jacobson, the ship's cook, and it was his widow, Mrs Jacobson, and their son and daughter, from Sydney, who attended that day. A death certificate was issued for John Jacobson (Wonoona district). A newspaper report, quoting the crew names on the ship's articles, named the cook as H. Polson, a native of Norway and a married man, with wife and family. The crew list, published in the Police Gazette, in March 1898, also lists the cook as being named H.Polson, and there is a death certificate under that name (Marine district). Many years later, a marble plaque on the Amy memorial would be inscribed with both names, "John Jacobson (H. Polson) Cook Norway".

The other body buried on that day at Bulli, was at the time presumed to be that of the winchman, Olsen, but a man, who knew Olsen well, had immediately stated that the body was not that of Olsen, but instead that of the mate. Yet another man did identify the body as Olsen. The body was subsequently re-identified, at the beginning of March 1898, from a life photograph, as being William Johnstone, an American. However, an absolutely positive identification was not possible, because the body had not been photographed by the coroner before being buried. Letters addressed to W. N. Johnson—most from relatives in America, but some from friends in Sydney—had been washed ashore. Later, the mate was named as Albert Theodore Johnson (a Swede) in the March 1898 crew list. There is a death certificate issued for O. A. Olsson, a 32 year old male (Marine district). Yet, in an item in the NSW Police Gazette, in March 1898, it is stated that the third body was supposed to be that of Carl Olsson, an able seaman (one of two men aboard with the surname Olson / Olsson).

A day earlier on Tuesday, 15 February 1898, Thomas Birch, the local resident who had died on the beach, was given a military funeral and was buried in the Anglican Cemetery at Bulli. His coffin draped in the Union Jack, was drawn from Thirroul to the grave site on an undercarriage that was drawn by some of his comrades from the local company of Artillery. A firing party fired three volleys over his grave.

Another of Amy's crew, identified only as "Number 4", who was found on Friday, 18 February, and was interred on the same day. Apart from Captain McKee, it seems that none of the other three recovered bodies of the crew were buried under their correct names, or if their names were even known with absolute certainty.

The owners of Amy, Warburton & Sons, met the costs of burials for the crew.

=== Inquest (Captain McKee) ===
The inquest into the death of Captain James McKee took place before Mr C.C. Russell, District Coroner, and a jury; both the Crown and the owners of Amy had legal representation. The inquest commenced its proceedings at the Bulli Pass Hotel—its building then occupied the site of Ryan's Hotel, Thirroul—on 14 February 1898, the same day that McKee's body was recovered. The Crown was represented because evidence had been tendered questioning the seaworthiness of Amy. There being little doubt that McKee had drowned, attention became focussed on Amy's condition, at the time she was wrecked.

The jury was taken to view the wreckage on the beach. Evidence was given by George McCauley, Thomas Kelly, and a labourer, Thomas Connor, that some of the timbers of Amy were rotten.

Proceedings were adjourned for a fortnight, then resumed at Bulli Court House, on 1 March 1898, with expert witnesses being brought from Sydney. The evidence that they gave attested to the sound condition of Amy's timber and the strength of her construction.

A timber expert, Mr Alexander Kethel, gave an opinion that, "the very strong hardwood masts strained the ship, eventually bursting up the sides, and thus contributing to the speedy breaking up of the vessel". He noted that the timber of a mast, at the point where it had snapped, was not rotten. He identified a piece of the ship's forecastle rail as the only piece of hardwood from the wreckage showing some significant rotting, but stated that this would not affect the stability of the vessel.

Thomas Kelly was then recalled for cross examination and admitted that he was not an expert on timber; by his earlier assertion that Amy had "too much paint and putty", he had meant that Amy was not seaworthy, because she broke up so rapidly. George McCauley was also recalled and he admitted that, "My opinion as to the rottenness was originally based on the rapidity with which the Amy broke up, not on an inspection of the timber."

The pilot at Wollongong, Andrew Thompson, testified that Amy was seaworthy, and that her Plimsoll line was one and half inches above the waterline when she left Wollongong for the last time. A former mate on Amy, Peter Miller, gave evidence that, after the 1896 grounding incident, Amy had been towed to Sydney without being pumped. Apparently, no one at the hearing realised that Miller's evidence concerning the pumping contradicted contemporaneous reports of the 1896 grounding.

The finding of the inquest was, "We find that James McKee met his death by drowning on the evening of Sunday, the 13th day of February, 1898 at Thirroul Beach, in the Colony of New South Wales, by the wreck of the brig 'Amy'." The jury added a rider, "In the opinion of the jury, rocket apparatus ought to be placed at closer intervals along the coast." It was an admission that, had suitable rescue equipment been available, perhaps some lives may have been saved.

No inquests were held in relation to the deaths of other members of the crew of Amy.

Board of Trade report No.5733 citing NSW Marine Board report and decision on Amy's wreck.

=== Marine Board inquiry ===
An inquiry, into the loss of Amy, opened on 21 March 1898. Evidence was given by Marine Board Shipping Inspector Newton, Marine Surveyor Banks, Pilot Thompson (of Wollongong), and David Drake, a shipwright. All said that Amy was sound, and this was supported by Amy's owner Charles George Warburton, who was also a coal merchant and alderman on Manly Council. After hearing the evidence, noting that no evidence on navigation was possible—all hands having been lost—the Marine Board reserved its decision.

The Marine Board of New South Wales, presided over by Captain Hixson, met on 28 March 1898, and announced its decision concerning the loss of Amy; "The wreck was caused by the vessel becoming embayed, and being cast ashore on the coast near Bulli during exceptionally heavy gales from seaward." The report and decision stated that the number of crew aboard Amy was eight.

The New South Wales records of the evidence given to the Marine Board inquiry into Amy's loss appear to have been lost or, otherwise, to no longer exist, but its finding survives in Board of Trade report No. 5733.

=== Replacement ===
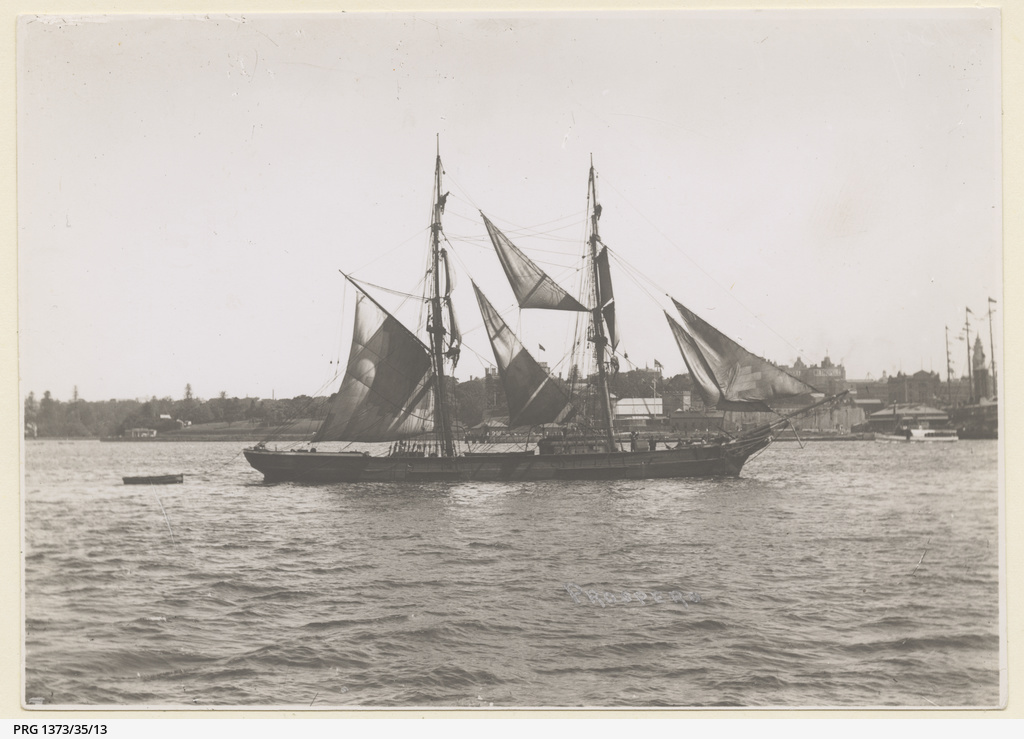
Prospero off Fort Macquarie, in Sydney Harbour. (A. D. Edwardes Collection, State Library of South Australia)

Four days after Amy was wrecked, her owner announced that the schooner, Prospero, would take Amy's place on the run between Wollongong and Sydney. Later shipping reports state that Prospero was, like Amy, a brig and so not a schooner. However, a photograph of the vessel shows a sail pattern, that is more typical of a brigantine. Prospero was already an old vessel, having been built in St Helier, Jersey in 1862. She was bought by her first Australian owners in 1869.

Prospero left Newcastle for Sydney, on 29 January 1901, for what was probably her last sea voyage. She subsequently was condemned as unseaworthy and had been converted to a coal hulk, by the end of February 1901. Prospero was still being used as a coal hulk, and was under tow by Almee, on 18 January 1906. She had just passed Pyrmont Bridge, bound for the Railways Wharf at Pyrmont, when she rapidly sank at around 9 a.m.—laden with 120 tons of coal, and without apparent explanation—in the fairway of Darling Harbour. Her crew and the coal lumpers on board were rescued. She was later raised, unloaded at the Gas Company wharf, and sent to a dock. Prospero may have survived as a hulk for some years later, as she continued to be registered.

=== Amy memorial ===
A meeting was held in the Oddfellows Hall at Bulli, on 11 March 1898, with its purpose being to arrange fundraising to erect a memorial. A decision was made that the memorial should be located near where Amy was wrecked and the body of her captain was recovered.

On 23 November 1898, a monument in memory of the crew of Amy was unveiled by Mrs. George Adams. Subscriptions had raised the money to erect it, and a further collection was taken up at the unveiling ceremony towards the cost of erecting a railing around the memorial. The original site of the memorial was on Thirroul Beach, near Flanagan's Creek. That location was on the part of the beach, then known as McCauley's Point, close to where Amy was wrecked.

The original inscription on the memorial—still present today—reads, "This monument was erected by residents of the district" "To the memory of Capt. McKee Officers & crew of the brig Amy, which was totally wrecked on Thirroul Beach Sunday 13th February 1898." "Unveiled by Mrs. George Adams on Wednesday 23rd November 1898" "O hear us when we cry to thee, for those in peril on the sea." "T. Ball, T. Farrell Trustees"

On Christmas Eve 1908, the monument was toppled and part of it rolled into the lagoon at the mouth of the creek. In August 1910, a charge against the man who damaged the monument, Alfred Ramsden, aged 63, was dismissed on the grounds that there was insufficient evidence that the damage was malicious; it was reported that "the defendant put his hat on top of the monument, and afterwards climbed up to take it off, and in doing so knocked the monument over".

By April 1923, erosion had resulted in the memorial being at some risk of collapsing. The lagoon was filled in, between around 1928 and 1943—apparently without relocating the monument—and the original location's surroundings are much altered, compared to their appearance in photographs from before the 1920s.

The original column stood taller than the one on the currently existing memorial. A photograph from 1934 shows the original column and the memorial surrounded by iron railings. In 1944, it was reported that the railings were in a state of disrepair. The base of the monument was overgrown with weeds and most of the iron railings had gone, by early 1950. The column was gone by the end of 1951.

The memorial was re-erected, in September 1952, on the beachfront in front of Thirroul Surf Life Saving Club. reusing portions of the original memorial. A colour photograph exists of the memorial, standing near the Surf Club, without any column, but another photograph shows it there, with a column that is similar to, but slightly taller than, its existing form.

The monument, with a shorter column, now stands in the centre of a roundabout near the pavilion at Thirroul Beach. The monument was reinstated on a larger sandstone plinth, at its current location, and was rededicated on 1 May 1994.

In 1996, an additional inscription that includes the names of the crew was added. However, the names on the memorial generally reflect the crew list of 24 January 1898, and are therefore not completely accurate. There are only seven names on the memorial, but it is known that there were, in total, eight crew members, including the captain and the mate. The addition of the crew's names did at least attempt to recognise, not only Captain McKee, but the remainder of the crew, by name.

Local residents expressed concern that the monument remained vulnerable to damage by passing vehicles, in 2017, and subsequently four sandstone blocks were installed as crash barriers .

Amy memorial

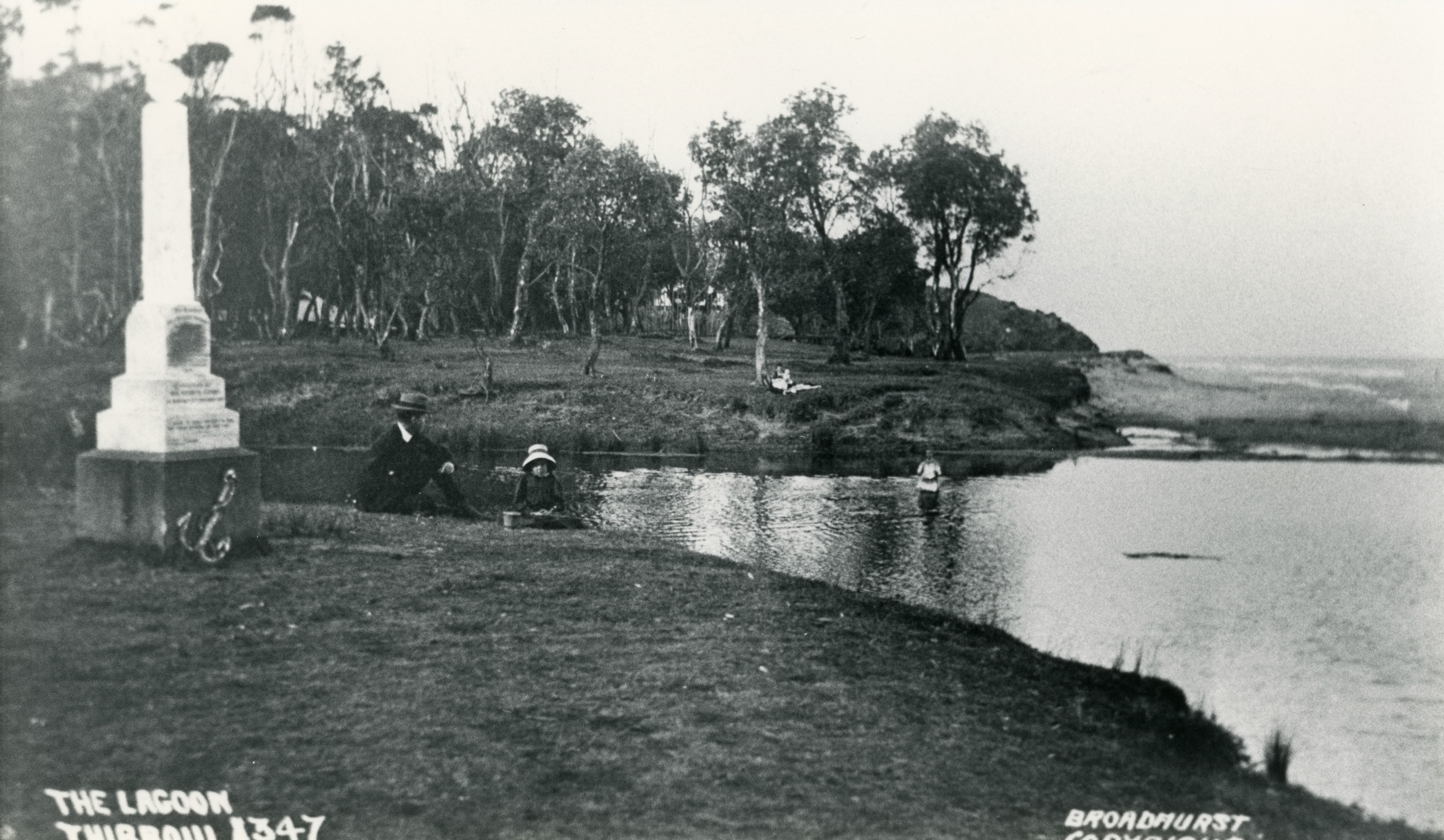
Amy memorial in its original location. (Wollongong City Libraries) The site is now different. The lagoon was filled in between c.1928 and 1943.

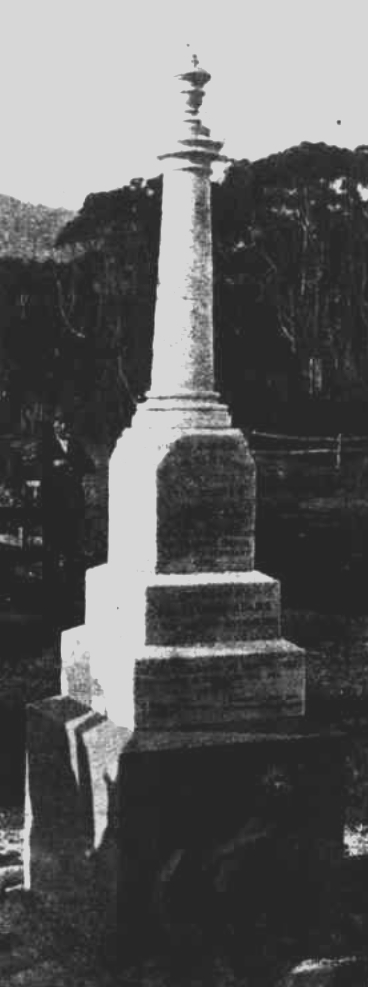
The memorial in 1898.

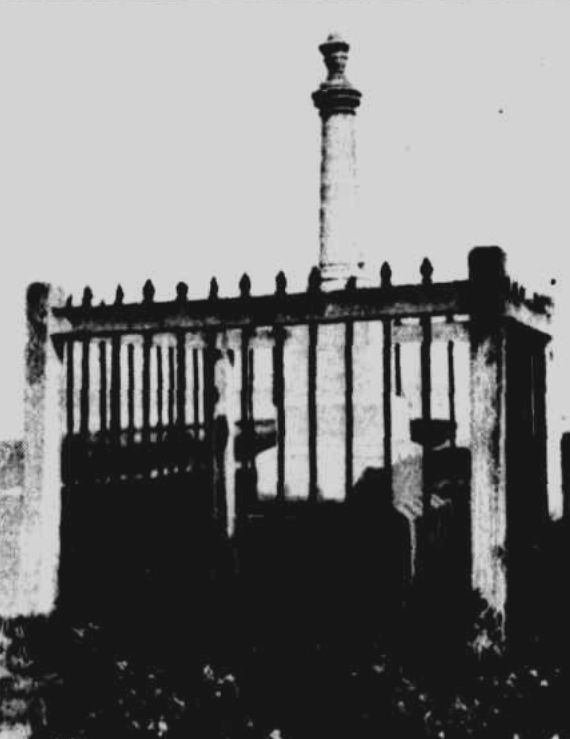
Memorial with iron railing, c.1934.

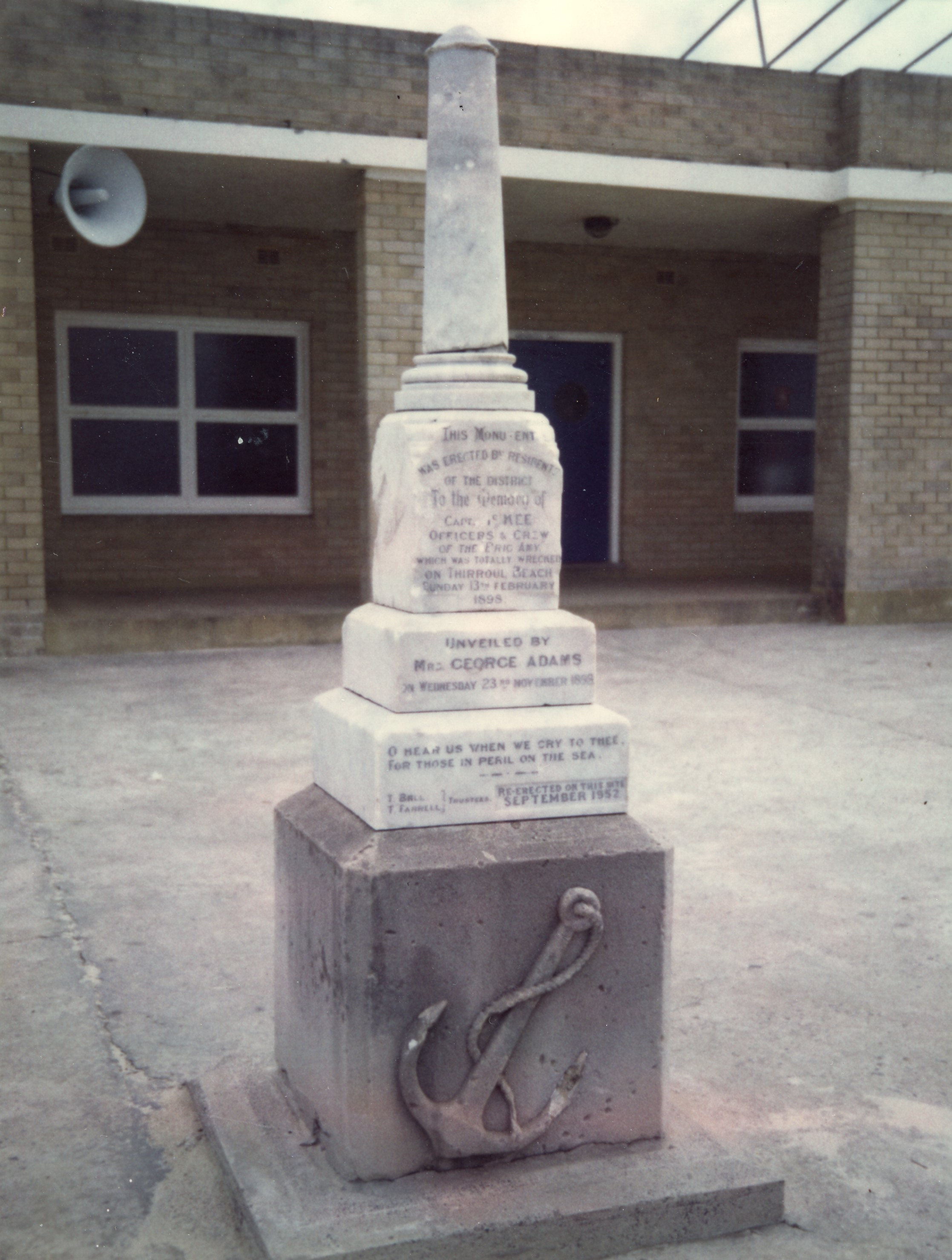
Amy memorial outside Thirroul Surf Club. (Wollongong City Libraries) It stood there from September 1952 to early 1994, when it was moved to its current location.

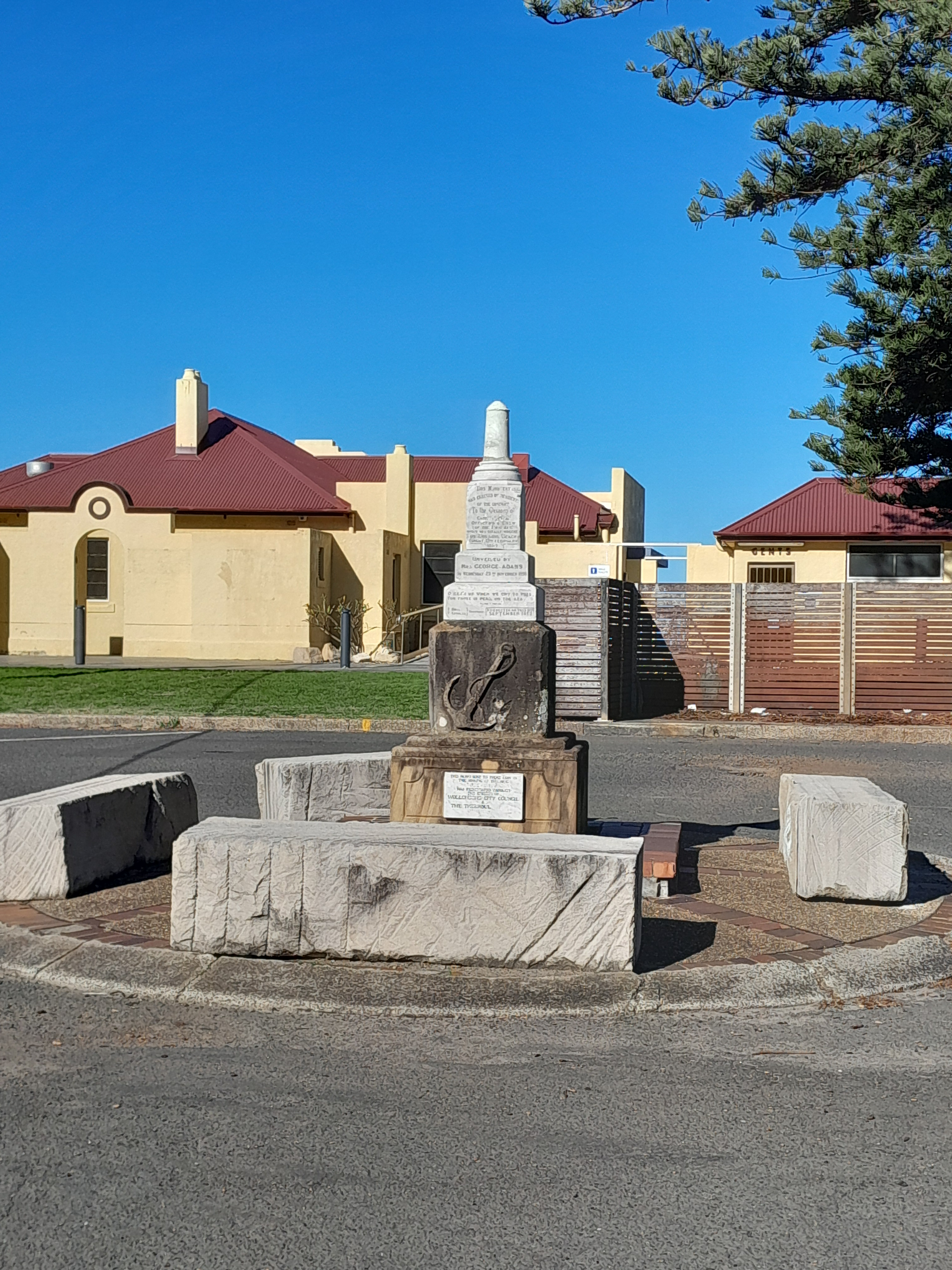
Amy memorial at its current location, where it has stood since 1994, with the sandstone block barriers installed c.2017 (August 2026)

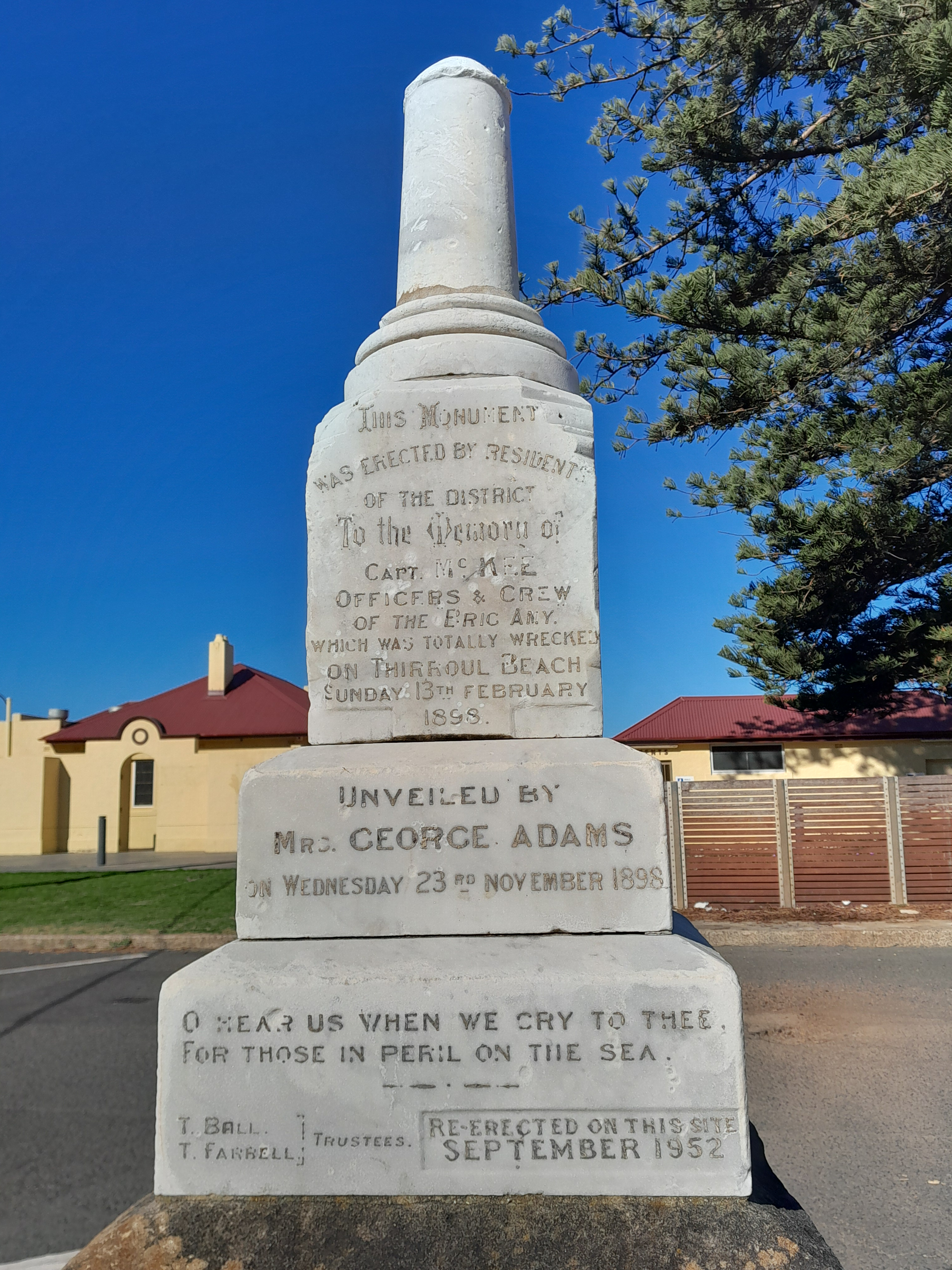
Amy memorial, original inscriptions with 1952 addition (August 2026)

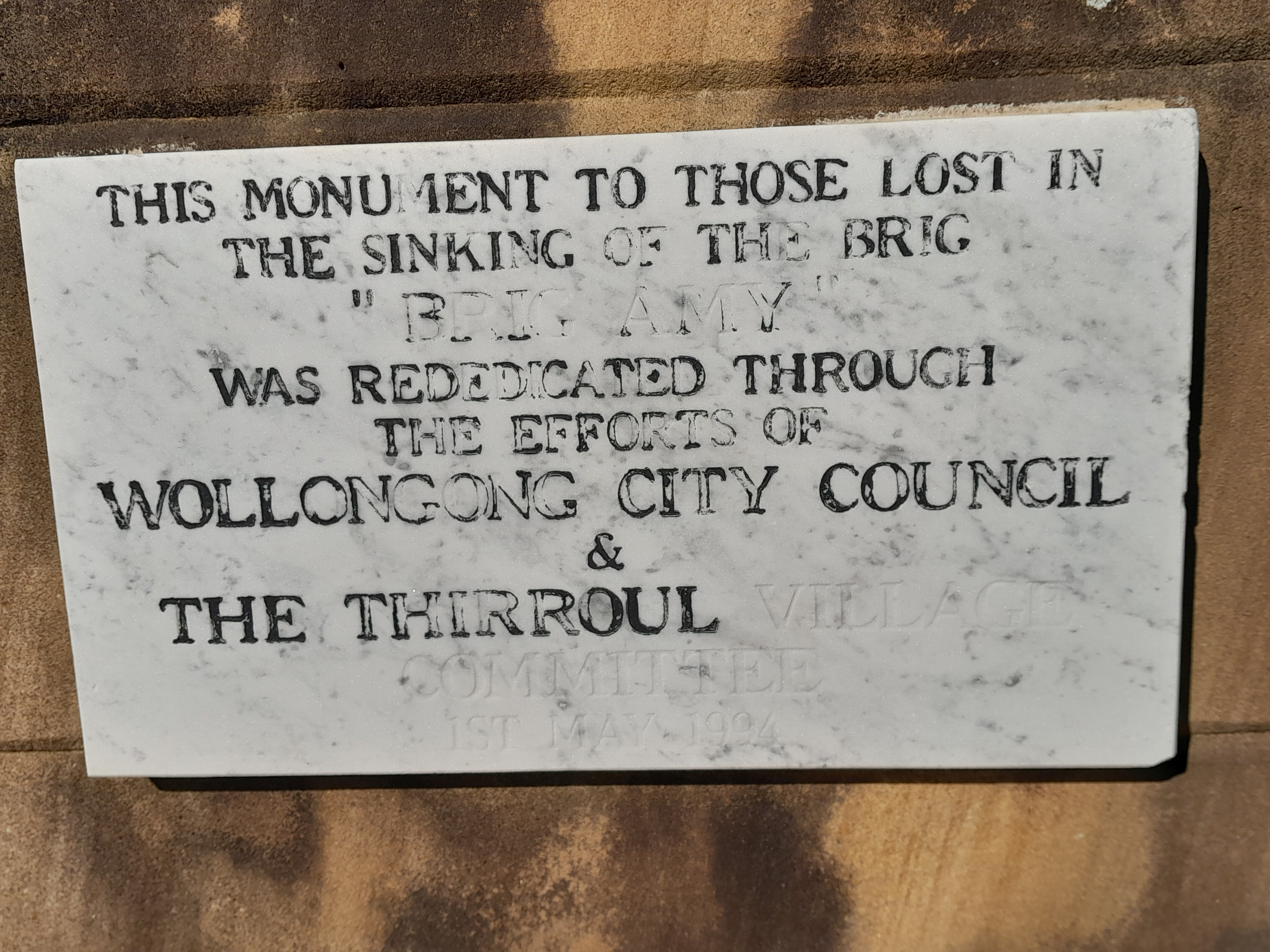
Amy memorial, 1994 rededication inscription (August 2026)

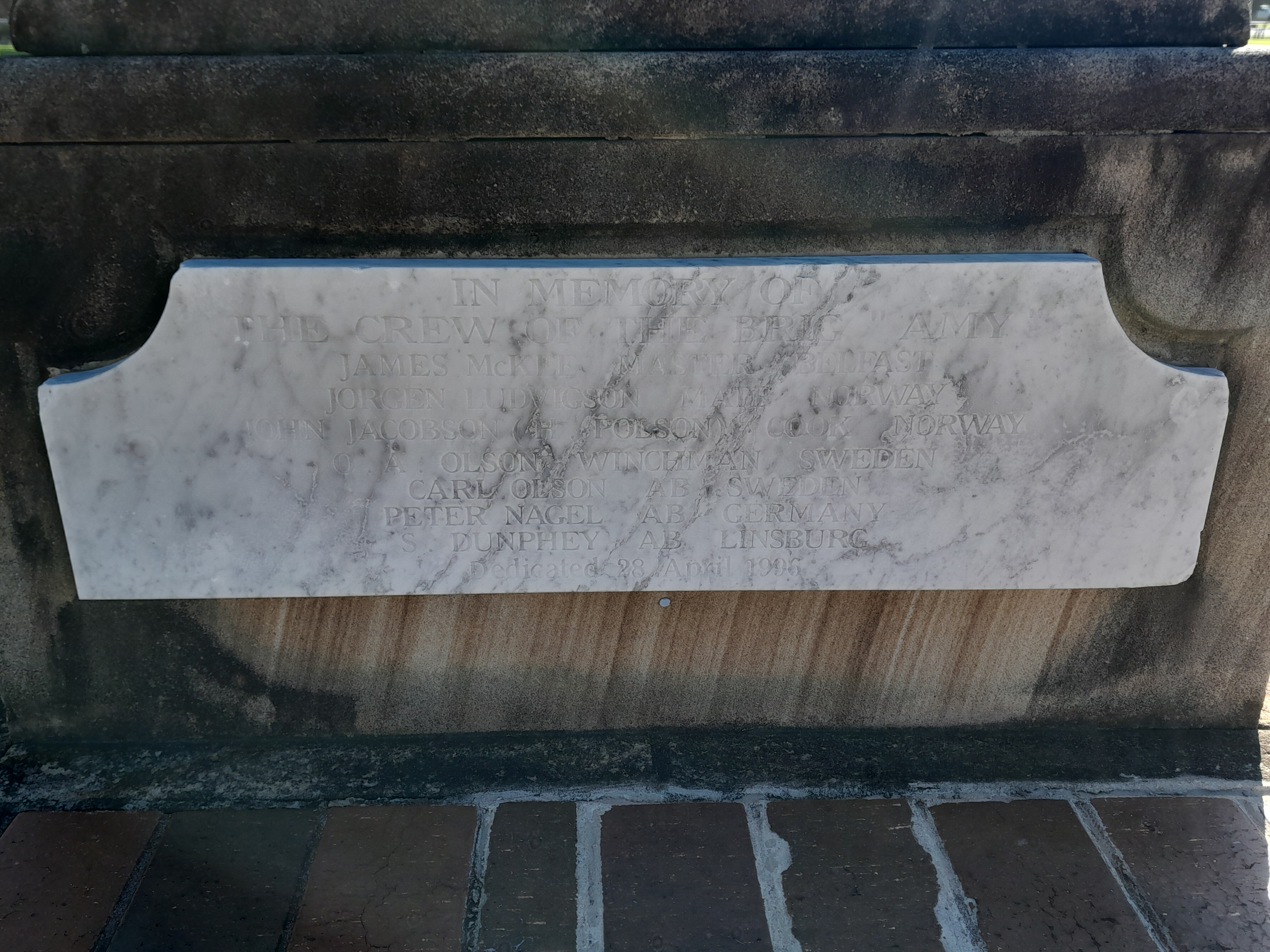
Amy memorial, crew list inscription added, in 1996, to the rear side of the memorial (August 2026)

== Remnants ==
The figurehead of Amy was for a time used as an ornament, in a large rockery in the garden of the mine manager's house at Bulli. It is now presumed to be lost. The wheel of Amy is held in the collection of the Illawarra Museum Wollongong.

What is reported to be remnants of the wreck of Amy lie only 180m off the beach at Thirroul, in around 5 m of water. Usually covered by sand, parts of a wreck are sometimes sighted by divers, when conditions are suitable.

In the early 1950s, the wreck of Amy apparently was regarded as lost, but further south, near Hewitt's Creek, lay what was then stated to be remnants of the wreck of a barque, Matador, which was wrecked in a storm in 1867, after having anchored near the old Bulli Jetty. Contemporaneous reports from February 1898 state that what remained of the hull of Amy came to rest about 200 yards off shore, but a large portion of her wreck lodged near the mouth of what was then known locally as 'the Second Creek'—probably modern day Hewitt's Creek—as distinct from Flanagan's Creek, where she went aground and was wrecked. Another contemporary reports states that a large portion of the wrecked vessel actually came ashore, in early March 1898, comprising "the whole of the port bow from keel to gunwhale".

== Legacy ==
The memorial to Amy's crew stands at Thirroul.

Although Amy's loss resulted in agitation for rescue stations to be established along the coast, that did not happen, at least in the form envisaged then. Thomas Kelly had made an unsuccessful effort to reach one of Amy's crew in the surf, while attached to the shore by a rope. While injured by wreckage in the waves, Kelly himself survived. Some regard it as the first attempt at such a rescue, at least in Australia. Following Amy's wrecking, guesthouses, at nearby Austinmer, paid to provide ropes that would allow locals to rescue people encountering difficulties, while swimming in the surf there. By 1903, volunteer surf life savers at Bronte were using a coiled rope and float as a rescue device. It was a precursor to the life saving reel—a reel mounted on a portable stand, with a rope fitted with a harness for the rescuer—invented in 1906, which was essential to the growth and success of the Surf Lifesaving movement.
