= Typhoon Amy (1962) =

Pacific typhoon in 1962

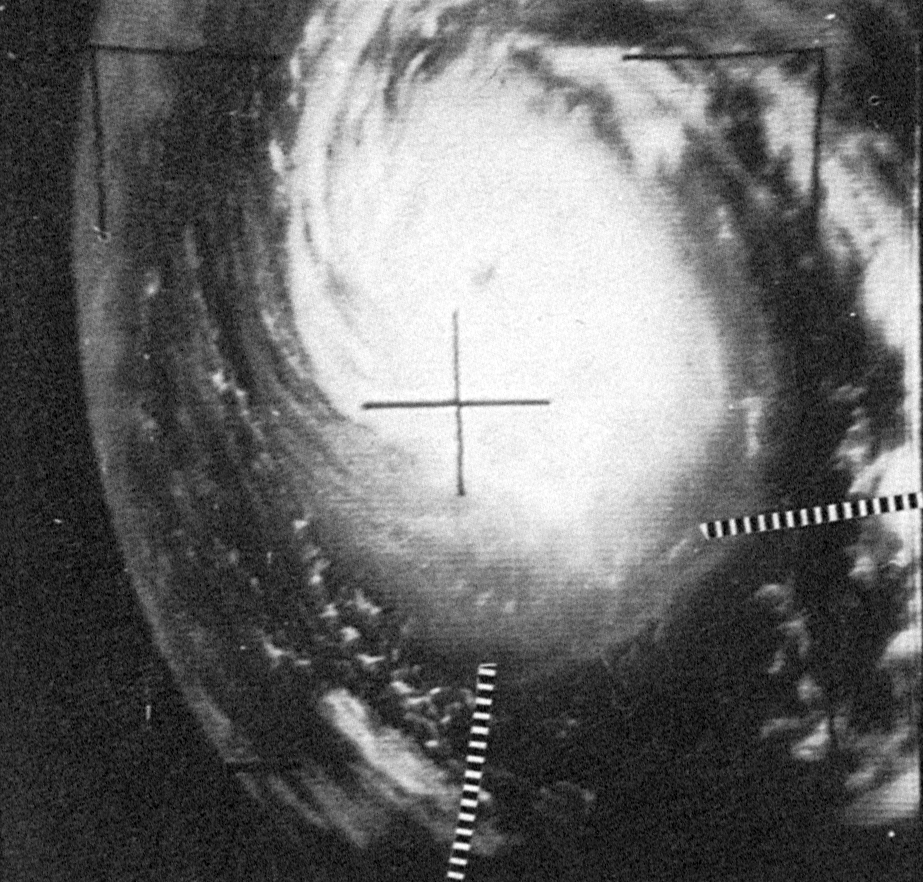
- Image of Typhoon Amy on August 31, 1962

Meteorological history
- Formed: August 28, 1962
- Dissipated: September 7, 1962

Unknown-strength storm
- 10-minute sustained (JMA)
- Lowest pressure: 935 hPa (mbar); 27.61 inHg

Category 5-equivalent super typhoon
- 1-minute sustained (SSHWS/JTWC)
- Highest winds: 260 km/h (160 mph)
- Lowest pressure: 935 hPa (mbar); 27.61 inHg

Overall effects
- Fatalities: 24
- Damage: Unknown
- Areas affected: Taiwan, China, North Korea, South Korea
- IBTrACS
- Part of the 1962 Pacific typhoon season

Typhoon Amy was a large and powerful tropical cyclone that impacted parts of Taiwan, China, and the Korean Peninsula in September 1962. Amy made a total of three landfalls throughout its lifespan, initially in Taiwan as a Category-4 super typhoon, with winds of approximately 240 km/h, then in China as a Category-1 typhoon, and in North Korea as an extratropical cyclone. Amy dissipated near the Russian coast a few days later.

== Meteorological history ==
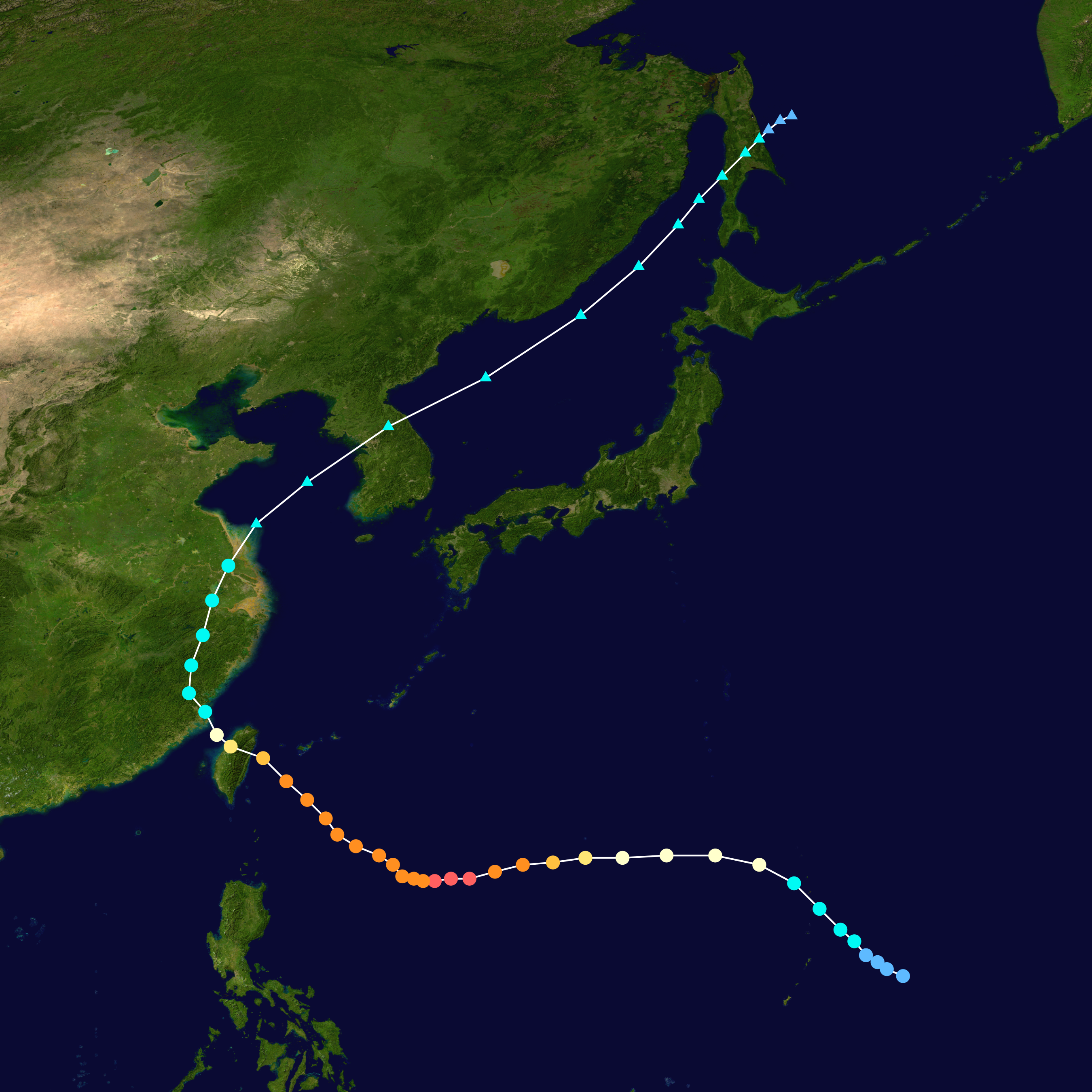
Map plotting the track and the intensity of the storm, according to the Saffir–Simpson scale.

The precursor to Typhoon Amy formed on August 27 northwest of Truk as a surge from the westerlies. The system rapidly gained strength in the open waters of the Pacific Ocean, gaining enough winds to be declared a tropical depression on the morning of August 29. The depression rapidly intensified, becoming a tropical storm within six hours. Now named Amy, the cyclone bent northeast around Saipan with winds of 70 mph (110 km/h). After passing Saipan, Amy strengthened into a typhoon during the afternoon of August 30. Continuing to rapidly strengthen over water, Amy reached its peak wind speed of 160 mph (260 km/h) on the evening of September 1, far to the northeast of the Philippines. After peaking with a pressure of 935 hPa, the typhoon weakened back to 155 mph (249 km/h) and soon 150 mph (240 km/h), which it sustained for several days. Crossing to the northeast of Luzon, Amy maintained strength, rapidly approaching the island of Taiwan on September 4. The storm slowly weakened to a 115 mph (185 km/h) typhoon off the coast of Taiwan, making landfall on September 5 near Yilan City. Amy weakened over land slightly before making landfall near Fuzhou later that day. Amy crossed over mainland China for several days, slowly weakening into a minimal tropical storm before crossing back into the waters of the East China Sea near Yancheng. Amy strengthened back to winds of 45 mph (72 km/h) before weakening into a tropical depression off the coast of South Korea. The depression made landfall near Incheon on September 7, weakening over land. After crossing out into open waters, the remains of Amy became extratropical on September 8, affected by the cold air. The extratropical remains of Amy continued northeast along the North Korean mainland, crossing the island of Sakhalin on September 9. The remains of Amy were lost off the eastern coast of Sakhalin on September 10.

== Impact ==
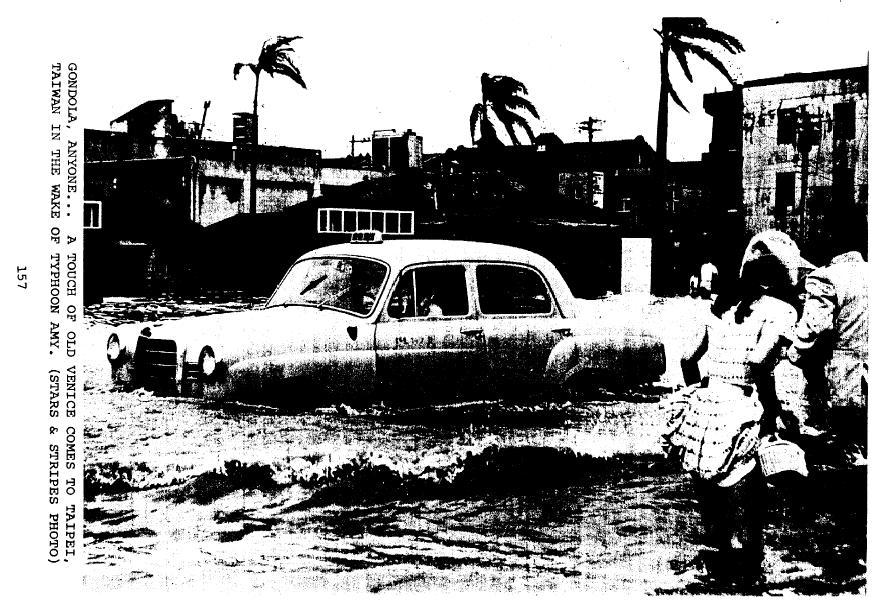
Damage from Amy in Taiwan.

Amy's flooding killed 24 people, with millions of dollars in damage, power, communication lines and buildings.

== See also ==
- Other storms of the same name
- Typhoon Opal (1962) - took a similar track a month earlier
