= Typhoon Amy (1951) =

Pacific typhoon in 1951

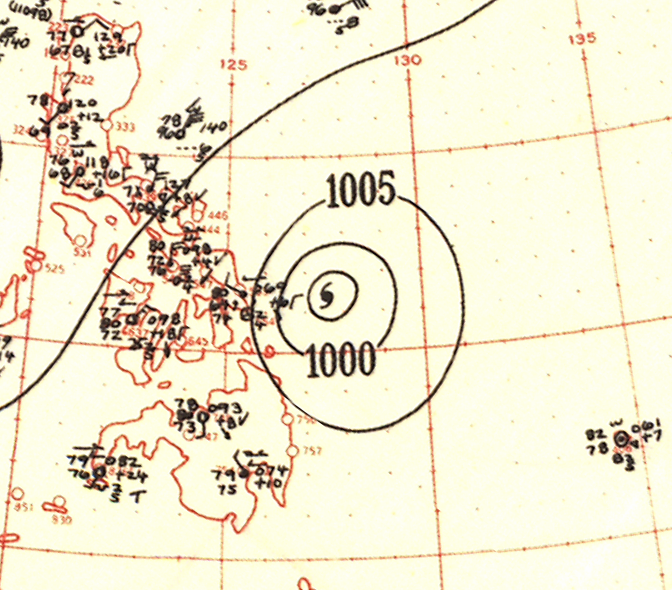
- Surface weather analysis of Typhoon Amy near peak intensity on December 8

Meteorological history
- Formed: December 3, 1951
- Dissipated: December 17, 1951

Category 4-equivalent typhoon
- 1-minute sustained (SSHWS/JTWC)
- Highest winds: 220 km/h (140 mph)
- Lowest pressure: 950 hPa (mbar); 28.05 inHg

Overall effects
- Fatalities: 556-991
- Damage: $30 million (1951 USD)
- Areas affected: Yap, Palau, Philippines
- IBTrACS
- Part of the 1951 Pacific typhoon season

Typhoon Amy was an intense and deadly tropical cyclone that struck areas of the central Philippines in December 1951. Impacting the archipelago during the 1951 eruption of Mount Hibok-Hibok, Amy exacerbated the effects of the volcano, greatly increasing the number of resulting deaths. The fifteenth named storm and fourteenth typhoon within the western Pacific Ocean that year, Amy developed from an area of low pressure near the Kwajalein Atoll on December 3. Tracking in a general westward direction, the storm quickly intensified to reach typhoon intensity the next day. However, the typhoon's asymmetricity resulted in a fluctuation of intensity over the following few days. Afterwards, Amy intensified to reach its peak intensity with maximum sustained winds of 220 km/h (140 mph) and a minimum barometric pressure of 950 mbar (hPa; 28.05 inHg) on December 8. (Note: All wind measurements are sustained for one minute, unless otherwise noted.) Over the ensuing two days, Amy moved over several islands in the central Philippines before emerging in the South China Sea on December 11 as the equivalent of a minimal typhoon. Shortly after, the tropical cyclone executed a tight anticyclonic loop while oscillating in strength several times before eventually weakening and dissipating on December 17, just east of Vietnam.

Amy was considered one of the worst typhoons to strike the Philippines on record. Making its initial landfall along with the concurrent eruption of Mount Hibok-Hibok on Camiguin, the typhoon disrupted volcanic relief operations and forced the displacement of victims already displaced by the volcano. Cebu City suffered the worst impacts of Amy – most of the city's buildings were heavily damaged, and 29 people died in the city. Strong winds and rainfall in the city associated with Amy also set records which still remain unbroken today. Damage there was estimated at 560 million Philippine pesos. Along the east coast of Leyte, where Amy initially struck, ninety percent of homes were destroyed, and a large swath of coconut plantations were wiped out. In Panay, located on the western side of the Philippines, at least a thousand homes were destroyed in 41 towns. Overall, Amy caused $30 million in damage, (Note: All damage totals are in 1951 United States dollars unless otherwise noted.) and at least 556 fatalities, though the final death toll may have been as high as 991, making the typhoon one of the deadliest in modern Philippine history. An additional 50,000 people were displaced.

== Meteorological history ==
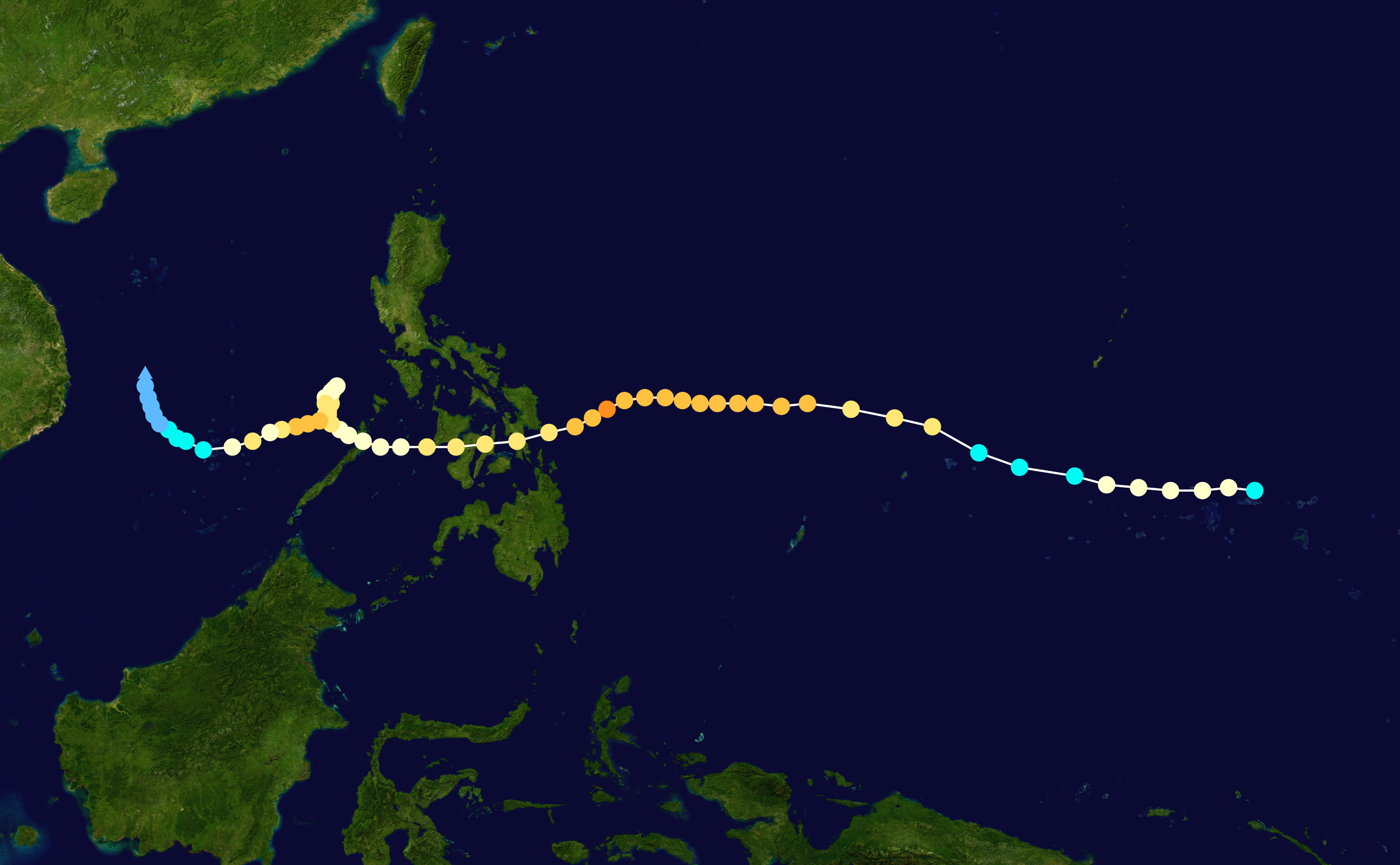
Map plotting the storm's track and intensity, according to the Saffir–Simpson scale Map key Saffir–Simpson scale Tropical depression (≤38 mph, ≤62 km/h) Tropical storm (39–73 mph, 63–118 km/h) Category 1 (74–95 mph, 119–153 km/h) Category 2 (96–110 mph, 154–177 km/h) Category 3 (111–129 mph, 178–208 km/h) Category 4 (130–156 mph, 209–251 km/h) Category 5 (≥157 mph, ≥252 km/h) Unknown Storm type Tropical cyclone Subtropical cyclone Extratropical cyclone, remnant low, tropical disturbance, or monsoon depression

The origins of Typhoon Amy can be traced back to a low-pressure area first detected over Kwajalein at 0500 UTC on November 29. Tracking westward, the Fleet Weather Center in Guam began to monitor vorticity for potential development, (Note: Prior to 1959 the Joint Typhoon Warning Center stationed in Guam was known as the Fleet Weather Center.) assigning the numeric designation 11122 to the tropical system. Late on December 2, a routine weather reconnaissance flight unexpectedly intercepted the disturbance and detected unusually strong westerly winds, a characteristic typically indicative of a tropical cyclone. As such, the flight, named Vulture George, was rerouted to investigate the area. After finding conclusive evidence of a closed low-pressure area, the Fleet Weather Center in Guam classified the disturbance as a tropical storm with winds of 100 km/h (60 mph). At the time, Amy had two separate centers of circulation, resulting in an asymmetrical wind field.

Following tropical cyclogenesis, the fast-moving tropical cyclone quickly intensified, reaching the equivalent of a Category 1 on the modern-day Saffir–Simpson hurricane wind scale. Between December 4 and 5, however, Amy briefly weakened back to tropical storm intensity before restrengthening. Steady intensification followed afterwards, with the typhoon reaching the equivalent of a Category 3 hurricane by 0000 UTC on December 6. By this time, the storm had slowed in forward speed. Later that day, the two, formerly separate circulation centers merged, resulting in an eye spanning 26 km (16 mi) in diameter. At 1200 UTC on December 8, Amy reached its peak intensity with winds of 220 km/h (140 mph) and a minimum barometric pressure of 950 mbar (hPa; 28.05 inHg), which would classify it as a modern-day Category 4 typhoon. At the same time, the tropical cyclone began to track slightly southwestward. At 0600 UTC the following day, Amy made its first landfall on southern Samar with an intensity equivalent of a Category 2 typhoon. Over the next two days, the typhoon weakened and moved over several islands in the Philippines including Leyte, Cebu, and Panay before emerging into the South China Sea on December 11.

In the South of China Sea on December 11, Amy quickly slowed in forward motion and began to execute a cyclonic loop. Late that day, the typhoon strengthened back to Category 2 intensity, and as such concurrently attained a tertiary peak intensity with winds of 160 km/h (100 mph) and a minimum barometric pressure of 968 mbar (hPa; 28.59 inHg). Late on December 13, Amy weakened back to a Category 1 typhoon for a transient period of time before restrengthening and reaching a quaternary peak intensity as a Category 3 typhoon with maximum sustained winds of 115 mph (185 km/h). Afterwards, the typhoon began to weaken, and at 0900 UTC on December 17, the Fleet Weather Center in Guam issued their last bulletin on the tropical cyclone. Upon the issuance of the last advisory, Amy set records for most typhoon bulletins issued at 58, and most reconnaissance fixes at 25. However, Amy continued to persist through the next day before degenerating into a remnant low-pressure area late on December 18. The following day, the associated remnants of Amy dissipated east of Vietnam.

== Impact and aftermath ==
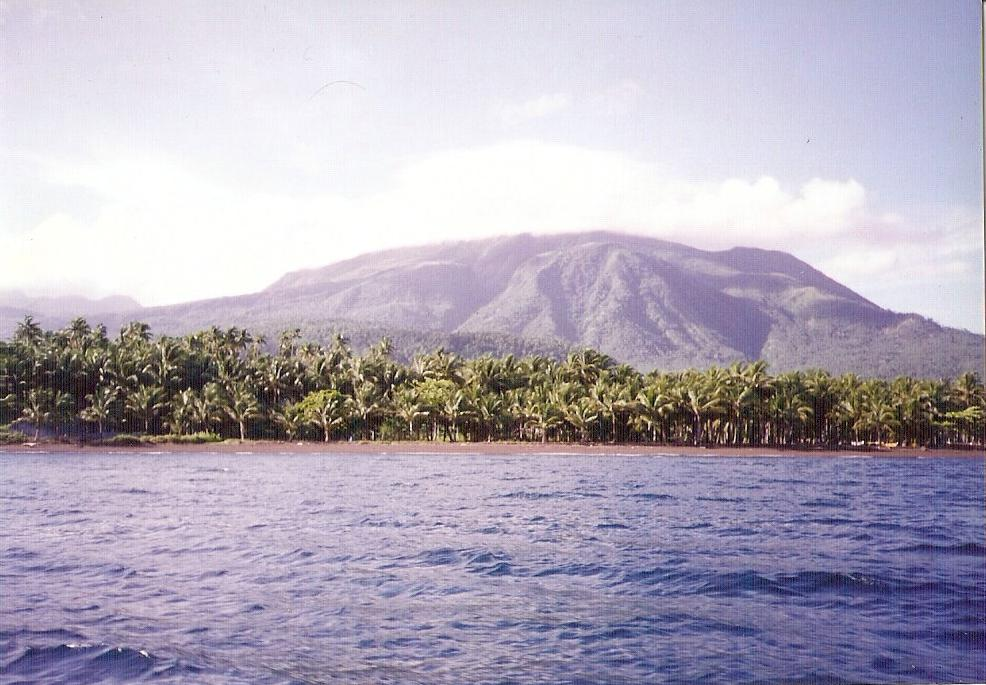
Mount Hibok-Hibok in 2007

Beginning on September 1, 1948, the then-active volcano Mount Hibok-Hibok on Camiguin Island in the Philippines began to release lava in a series of eruption events which continued for the ensuing three years. On December 4, 1951, a large, Peléan eruption event later rated between a 2 and 3 on the Volcanic Explosivity Index, sending pyroclastic flows and lahars down the northeast flank of the volcano. The resultant ash flows alone killed an estimated 500 people on the island, making it one of the deadliest volcanic eruption events in recorded history. As the typhoon approached the archipelago, relief agencies were forced to divert aid operations to victims of the recent eruption, slowing the recovery process.

Upon making landfall on south Samar on December 10, Hibok-Hibok erupted six times in rapid succession, worsening the effects of both the typhoon and the volcano. Amy had also made landfall on an area impacted by a second typhoon three weeks prior. Strong winds displaced and destroyed residences and uprooted trees, while torrential rainfall caused rivers to overflow, resulting in the flooding of sugarcane fields and the washing away of bridges. Radio communications to and between most of the central Philippine islands were disrupted.

Cebu was one of the worst impacted cities. At the local airport, an anemometer recorded sustained winds of 160 km/h (100 mph) early on December 10, which remains a record for the city. Rainfall peaked at 195.3 mm (7.69 in); at the time this made the typhoon the wettest tropical cyclone in Cebu history. All buildings made of light construction materials were at least partially damaged, with many large structures sustaining roof or other damage. At least 29 people were killed in the city, including the drownings of three due to the resultant flooding. The typhoon's effects caused the cessation of the city's power supply. Damage in Cebu totaled 560 million Philippine pesos. At least a hundred other people in Cebu City were displaced. Offshore, 28 ships capsized due to winds caused by Amy, including 7 inter-island vessels. This set a new record for vessels sunk by a typhoon in Cebu, which Amy held until Typhoon Mike sunk 88 ships in 1990.

On Samar, where Amy first struck, reports indicated that 27 people died, despite initial reports that stated that there were no fatalities. In Iloilo City on Visayas, two people were killed and seventeen others were injured. Property damage in Bacolod, Negros was estimated at $250,000, and 52 people died, with an additional 2,250 persons rendered homeless. Elsewhere on Negros, 30 percent of the island's vital sugar crop was destroyed. On the east coast of Leyte, the typhoon was considered the worst in living memory, and ninety percent of homes there were destroyed. In Negros Oriental, schoolhouses in Canlaon, Vallehermoso, Negros Oriental, and Guihulngan were blown down. An aerial survey mission estimated that at least30 sq mi (78 km^{2}) of coconut plantations were devastated; other coconut plantations throughout the Philippines also suffered considerable damage. Copra crops also suffered sizeable losses, though production was expected to remain at forecast levels. Tacloban's San Jose Airfield was severely damaged by the strong storm surge from Amy. In the Tacloban and Surigao Strait area, an estimated 146 people were killed. In the Leytenian town of Abuyog, the mayor had announced that 176 people were killed in the town alone. Another 135 fatalities were confirmed in Sogod. More than 100 persons were injured by falling coconuts and other airborne debris. On Leyte alone, damage was estimated at $8 million. The Red Cross estimated over a thousand homes in 41 towns on Panay were destroyed by the storm. More than 20 percent of crops and infrastructure were destroyed. Four people were killed on the island. Upon looping in the South China Sea, Amy brought torrential rainfall to areas of Manila, though no damage was reported.

Overall, Amy caused at least an estimated $30 million in damage throughout the central Philippines. However, the total number of fatalities directly associated with the effects of the typhoon remain disputed, and may range anywhere from 569 to 991, making Amy one of the deadliest typhoons to strike the island nation in recorded history. An additional 50,000 people were rendered homeless by the storm. The typhoon was characterized by the Philippine weather bureau to be the worst typhoon to strike the Philippines in at least 70 years. In the aftermath of Amy, then-president of the Philippines Elpidio Quirino declared a state of public calamity for eleven central Philippine provinces including the island of Camiguin, which was heavily affected by both the typhoon and Mount Hibok-Hibok. On December 24, the American Red Cross granted $25,000 to the Philippine Red Cross.

== See also ==
- Other storms named Amy
- Typhoon Durian – Intense tropical cyclone that caused widespread damage in the central Philippines and Vietnam
- Typhoon Angela (1995) – Super typhoon that brought flooding and strong storm surge to the Bicol Region of the Philippines
- Typhoon Yunya (1991) – Struck the Philippines during the 1991 eruption of Mount Pinatubo
