= Ammi =

Ammi may refer to:

- Ammi (plant), a plant genus in the family Apiaceae
- Ahmed Ammi (born 1981), Moroccan footballer
- Ammi Hondo (born 1997), Japanese para-alpine skier
- R. Ammi Cutter (1902–1993), justice of the Massachusetts Supreme Judicial Court
- Rabbi Ammi, a sage mentioned in the Mishnah and Talmud
- 1-Aminomethyl-5-methoxyindane, a drug
- Association of Medical Microbiology and Infectious Disease Canada, known as AMMI Canada

== See also ==
- includes persons with the forename
- Ami (disambiguation)
- Amy (disambiguation)
- Amie (disambiguation)
