= AAMI (disambiguation) =

AAMI is an Australian insurance provider.

AAMI or Aami may also refer to:

- Ann Arbor, Michigan, US
- Aami, a 2018 Indian film
- Association for the Advancement of Medical Instrumentation
- AAMI Classic, an international tennis tournament held in Kooyong, Melbourne, Australia
- AAMI Stadium, an Australian rules football stadium located in West Lakes, Adelaide
- AAMI Park, a rectangular football stadium located in the Melbourne Sports and Entertainment Precinct
- AAMI Vase, a Group 2 Australian thoroughbred horse race

== See also ==
- AMI (disambiguation)
