= Typhoon Amy (1991) =

Pacific typhoon in 1991

Typhoon Amy (Gening)
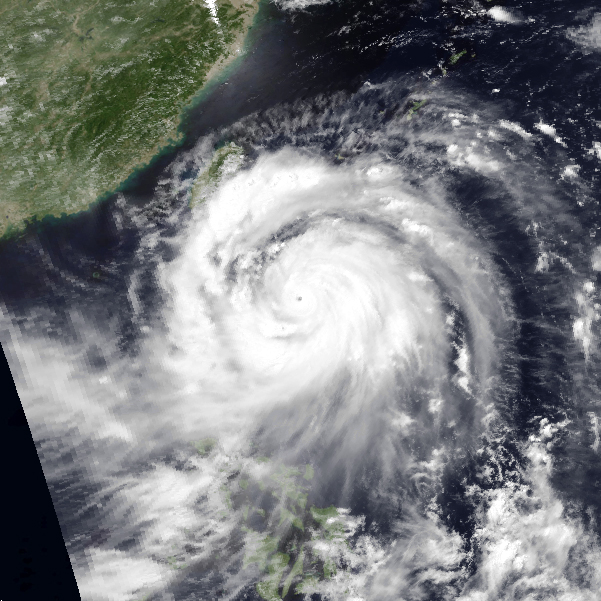
- Typhoon Amy just before peak intensity on July 18

Meteorological history
- Formed: July 14, 1991
- Dissipated: July 20, 1991

Very strong typhoon
- 10-minute sustained (JMA)
- Highest winds: 175 km/h (110 mph)
- Lowest pressure: 930 hPa (mbar); 27.46 inHg

Category 4-equivalent typhoon
- 1-minute sustained (SSHWS/JTWC)
- Highest winds: 230 km/h (145 mph)
- Lowest pressure: 916 hPa (mbar); 27.05 inHg

Overall effects
- Fatalities: 136
- Missing: 2
- Damage: $4.87 billion (1991 USD)
- Areas affected: Philippines, Taiwan, Hong Kong, China
- IBTrACS
- Part of the 1991 Pacific typhoon season

Typhoon Amy, known in the Philippines as Typhoon Gening, was a very destructive typhoon which was the second typhoon to strike China in a week during mid-July 1991. An area of convection was first observed on July 13 within the vicinity of Yap. A tropical depression developed the next day. While initially tracking westward, the system slowly deepened, becoming Tropical Storm Amy on July 16. After briefly turning northwestward, Amy intensified into a typhoon on July 17. Continuing to intensify as it tracked through the Luzon Strait, Amy reached its peak intensity of 175 km/h (110 mph) on July 18. (Note: All winds are in ten-minute sustained standards unless otherwise implied by stating the agency the winds were from.) That evening, the typhoon began to show signs of weakening, although it was still believed to have been a typhoon when it made landfall in the province of Guangdong on July 19, becoming the strongest tropical cyclone to hit the province in 22 years. Once inland, the storm rapidly weakened, and by late on July 20, had dissipated completely.

The storm's large size resulted in flooding, and high winds blew ash from erupting Mount Pinatubo across the Philippines. Around 7,000 people were forced to evacuate from their homes due to the threat of mudflows and approximately 500 homes were destroyed. One person in the country was killed. Thirty-three people were killed and two others went missing after two ships capsized offshore. In Taiwan, three fatalities were reported and roughly 460,000 customers lost power. In the Guandong province, 99 people were killed and 5,239 others were hurt. Roughly 400,000 homes were damaged or destroyed and more than 200,000 ha (494,210 acres) of farmland was flooded. Monetary damage in the province was estimated at ¥23.6 billion (US$4.42 billion). Across southern Fujian, at least 30 people were injured and 1,300 homes were demolished. Damage in Zhangzhou, the region of Fujian worst affected by Amy, was estimated at ¥2.4 billion (US$450 million). (Note: Currencies can be converted to United States Dollars using (New People's Currency) Yuan Measuring worth with an exchange rate of the year 1991.) Throughout its six-day path, the typhoon was responsible for 136 lives and US$4.87 billion in damage.

== Meteorological history ==
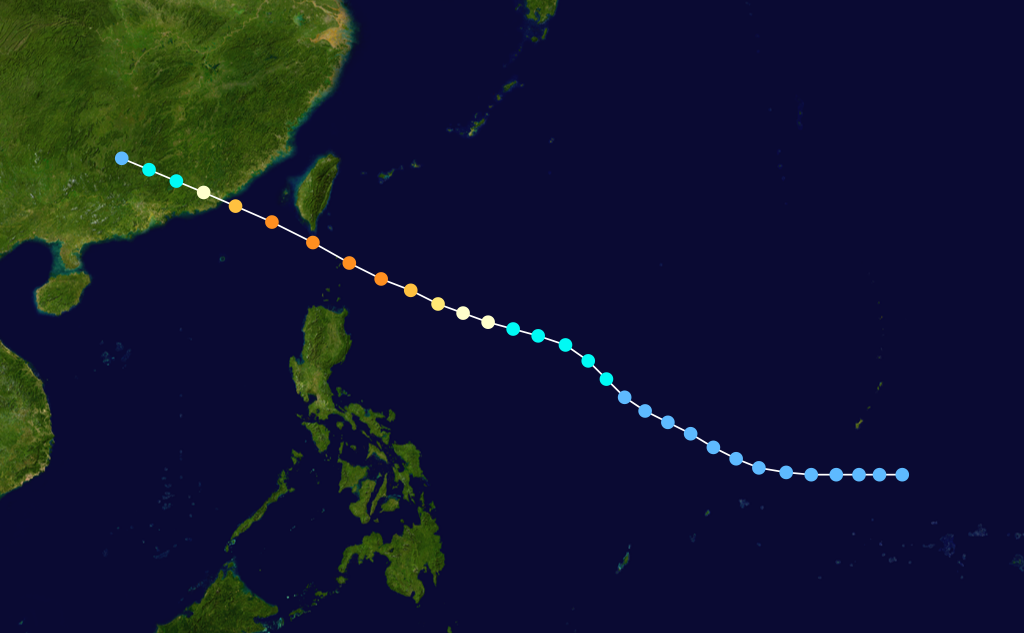
Map plotting the storm's track and intensity, according to the Saffir–Simpson scale Map key Saffir–Simpson scale Tropical depression (≤38 mph, ≤62 km/h) Tropical storm (39–73 mph, 63–118 km/h) Category 1 (74–95 mph, 119–153 km/h) Category 2 (96–110 mph, 154–177 km/h) Category 3 (111–129 mph, 178–208 km/h) Category 4 (130–156 mph, 209–251 km/h) Category 5 (≥157 mph, ≥252 km/h) Unknown Storm type Tropical cyclone Subtropical cyclone Extratropical cyclone, remnant low, tropical disturbance, or monsoon depression

Typhoon Amy originated from an area of persistent convection that was first noted by the Joint Typhoon Warning Center (JTWC) on the morning of July 13, 1991. Increased convection, slight pressure falls within a 24-hour period at Yap, and the lack of vertical wind shear led to the issuance of a Tropical Cyclone Formation Alert during the late morning hours of July 14 by the JTWC. Two hours later, the Japan Meteorological Agency (JMA) upgraded the system into a tropical depression. (Note: The Japan Meteorological Agency is the official Regional Specialized Meteorological Center for the western Pacific Ocean.) Although the overall cloud organization remained poor, deep convection persisted and a second alert was issued at 10:00 UTC on July 15. The JTWC classified the system as a tropical depression eight hours later. At the time of the upgrade, the depression was located about 670 km (415 mi) north-northwest of Yap.

Despite the JTWC suggesting that significant deepening was unlikely, the depression steadily intensified as it tracked westward. The JTWC upgraded the depression into Tropical Storm Amy at 00:00 UTC on July 16, with the JMA following suit six hours later. (Note: Wind estimates from the JMA and most other basins throughout the world are sustained over 10 minutes, while estimates from the United States-based Joint Typhoon Warning Center are sustained over 1 minute. 10-minute wind speeds are about 1.14 times the amount of 1-minute wind speeds.) That evening, the JMA reported that Amy had strengthened into a severe tropical storm. Meanwhile, Amy turned northwestward for about 18 hours on July 16 as a mid-tropsheric shortwave trough passed to its north that temporarily eroded a subtropical ridge to its north. Following the passing of the trough, strong subsidence allowed for the ridge to re-strengthen, resulting in a more westerly track by July 17. The JTWC upgraded Amy into a typhoon at 06:00 UTC on July 17; the JMA did the same at noon. At the time, the typhoon was located roughly 1,000 km (620 mi) east-southeast of Kaohsiung.

Amy began to intensify at a faster rate on July 17 as it traversed the Luzon Strait. At 00:00 UTC on July 18, the JTWC increased the intensity of Amy to 195 km/h (120 mph), equivalent to a Category 3 hurricane on the United States–based Saffir-Simpson Hurricane Wind Scale (SSHWS). Later that day, both the JTWC and JMA agreed that Amy attained its peak intensity, with the JTWC estimating winds of 235 km/h (145 mph), equal to Category 4 status on the SSHWS, and the JMA estimating winds of 175 km/h (110 mph). The typhoon also began to unexpectedly accelerate as it crossed the Bashi Channel. By the evening of July 18, upper-level outflow became more restricted, signifying a weakening trend. On July 19, Amy made landfall near Shantou; the JTWC and JMA estimated winds of 195 km/h (120 mph) and 145 km/h (90 mph) respectively at the time of landfall. Upon making landfall, the system dissipated rapidly over the mountains in southeastern China. The JTWC ceased tracking the system at 00:00 UTC on July 20, with the JMA following suit 18 hours later.

== Impact ==
Due to the large size of the circulation of Amy, volcanic ash from erupting Mount Pinatubo in the Philippines was blown towards Manila, prompting the closure of Manila International Airport. Volcanic debris from Mount Pinatubo's slopes loosened by heavy rain destroyed approximately 500 houses throughout the country, including 300 in Floridablanca, 50 in Santa Rita, and 130 in Concepcion. About 7,000 people were forced to flee their homes in eight towns across the Pampanga and Tarlac provinces due to the threat of mudflows, including at least 1,200 in Tarlac. Seven people there were rescued from floodwaters near a river. Floodwaters from the Abacan River resulted in the destruction of three bridges. A 43-year-old man died when his jeep fell into an embankment on Mindoro Island. Offshore, a 460 tonnes (505 short tons) ship Emerald capsized, resulting in the rescue of 83 passengers and 21 crewmen in addition to two deaths and two others missing. In the Taiwan Strait, a Cypriot ship Blue River with 31 crew members on board vanished on high seas. None of the crew survived.

The outer fringes of the typhoon lashed Taiwan, resulting in high winds and triggering landslides that blocked roads. The Kaohsiung International Airport was closed due to the storm. Strong winds snapped power lines, leaving 460,000 households without electricity. A man was killed when his car rammed a truck in heavy rain while two fisherman caught in high waves were presumed to have drowned.

Typhoon Amy became the strongest typhoon to hit Guandong in 22 years. Heavy rains spread across eastern Guangdong, peaking at 228 mm (9.0 in) in Fengshun County, while also providing drought relief to the area. The typhoon also inflicted heavy damage across the province, with the hardest hit areas located near Shantou, where the storm made landfall. According to media reports, 99 people were killed and 5,239 others were injured. About 400,000 homes were damaged or destroyed, and over 200,000 ha (494,210 acres) of farmland was flooded. A total of 214 bridges, 408 boats, 792 km (492 mi) of roads, and many irrigation facilities were damaged by the storm. Monetary damage was estimated at ¥23.6 billion (US$4.42 billion). The airports of Shantou and Xiamen were forced to close. Following the storm, insurance companies provided ¥100 million (US$18.7 million) in compensation. Across southern Fujian, at least 30 people were injured and 1,300 homes were demolished. More than 6.9 million trees, including 6.2 million banana trees, were damaged, while over 10,000 ha (25,000 acres) of paddy fields and 13,000 ha (32,000 acres) of sugar-cane were flooded. A 20 tonnes (22 short tons) fishing vessel sank. Losses in Zhangzhou, the region of Fujian worst affected by Amy, were estimated at ¥2.4 billion (US$450 million). Nationwide, the typhoon destroyed 38,000 homes. Typhoon Amy was the second typhoon to strike the country in a week, following Typhoon Zeke; later that month, Tropical Storm Brenda would also hit the country, resulting in further destruction across southeastern China.

In Hong Kong, a Hurricane No. 1 signal was issued on the afternoon of July 18 when Typhoon Amy was about 780 km (485 mi) to the east. Early the next day, it was raised to a No. 3 signal. The lowest sea-level pressure of 994 mbar (29.4 inHg) was recorded at the Hong Kong Royal Observatory shortly before landfall in mainland China. Sha Tin recorded a peak rainfall storm total of 103.5 mm (4.07 in), of which 60.5 mm (2.38 in) fell within a 24-hour period. Tai Mo Shan recorded a peak wind gust of 104 km/h (65 mph). Scaffoldings at North Point collapsed due to strong winds, and a man in Sai Kung was injured after he was blown off a ladder. Two small crafts were damaged at Chai Wan and Stanley. Ferry service from Hong Kong to Shantou was cancelled.

== See also ==
- Other storms of the same name
- Typhoon Hal (1985)
