= Typhoon Opal (1962) =

Pacific typhoon in 1962

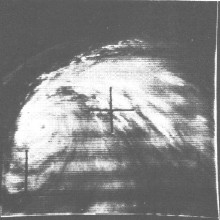
- Typhoon Opal on August 4

Meteorological history
- Formed: July 30, 1962
- Dissipated: August 9, 1962

Unknown-strength storm
- 10-minute sustained (JMA)
- Lowest pressure: 900 hPa (mbar); 26.58 inHg

Category 5-equivalent super typhoon
- 1-minute sustained (SSHWS/JTWC)
- Highest winds: 270 km/h (165 mph)
- Lowest pressure: 910 hPa (mbar); 26.87 inHg

Overall effects
- Fatalities: 21 confirmed
- Missing: 90
- Damage: $25 million (1962 USD)
- Areas affected: Taiwan, China, Korea, and Japan
- IBTrACS
- Part of the 1962 Pacific typhoon season

Typhoon Opal was a super typhoon that struck Taiwan, China, Korea and Japan in 1962.

== Meteorological history ==
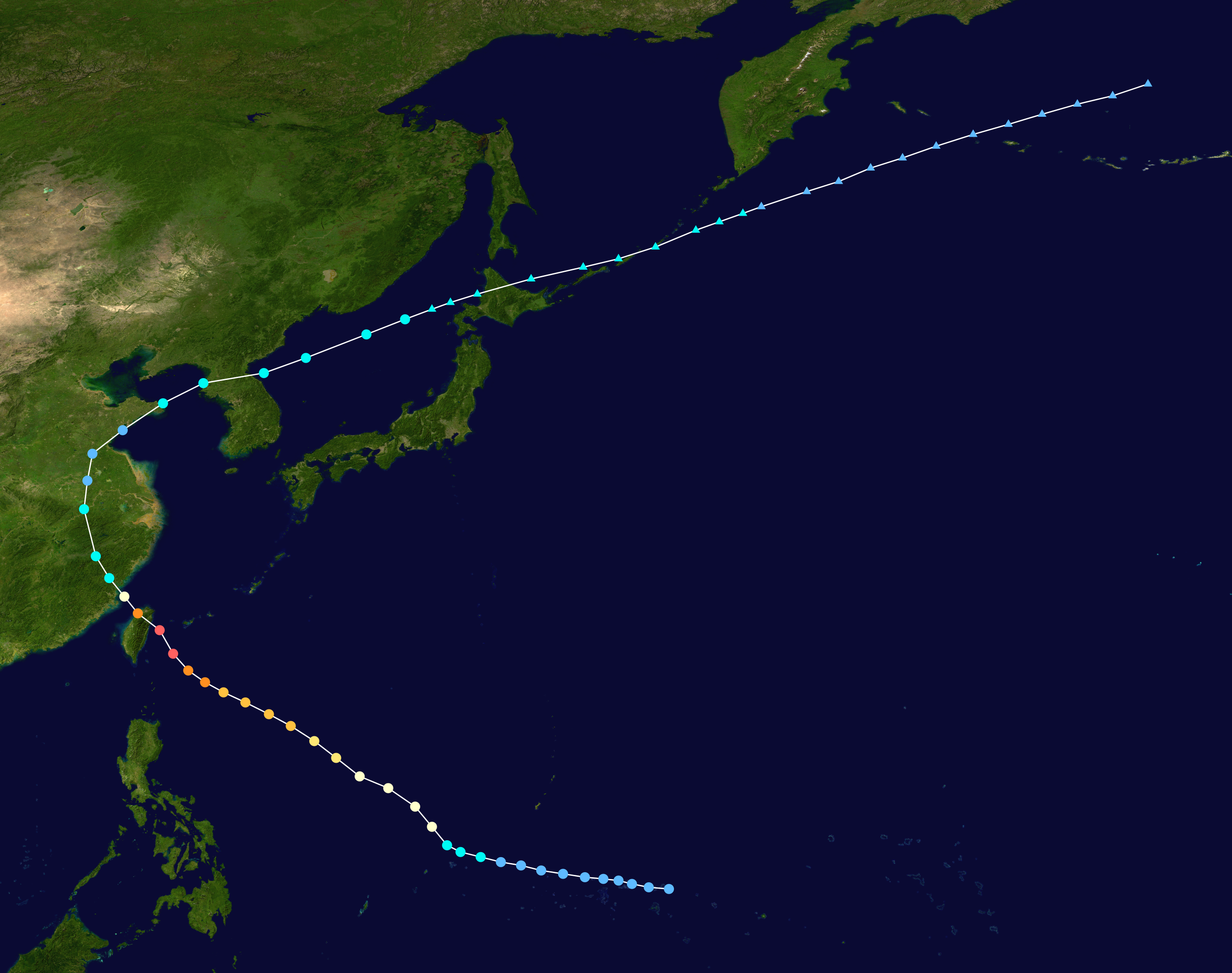
Map plotting the storm's track and intensity, according to the Saffir–Simpson scale Map key Saffir–Simpson scale Tropical depression (≤38 mph, ≤62 km/h) Tropical storm (39–73 mph, 63–118 km/h) Category 1 (74–95 mph, 119–153 km/h) Category 2 (96–110 mph, 154–177 km/h) Category 3 (111–129 mph, 178–208 km/h) Category 4 (130–156 mph, 209–251 km/h) Category 5 (≥157 mph, ≥252 km/h) Unknown Storm type Tropical cyclone Subtropical cyclone Extratropical cyclone, remnant low, tropical disturbance, or monsoon depression

An easterly wave met with a polar trough just northwest of the island of Ponape. on the afternoon of July 28. The Joint Typhoon Warning Center (JTWC) began following the wave for the next day, as it headed westward, north of Truk. Slowly curving northeast from the island, the wave soon was upgraded to a tropical depression with winds of 30 mph (48 km/h) with no eye structure on July 30. The depression strengthened on the morning of July 31 to 35 mph (56 km/h) winds and persisted throughout the day at that strength. The depression continued its northwestern curve, speeding up and weakening once again to 30 mph (48 km/h) on the morning of August 1. After passing Woleai, the depression strengthened once again and became Tropical Storm Opal the same afternoon. The storm continued intensifying during the afternoon, with winds reaching 50 mph (80 km/h) by nightfall. By the next morning, Opal was upgraded into a typhoon, the eighth of the 1962 season. The typhoon, now northwest of the island of Ulithi, continued turning to the northwest, beginning to slow as the system continued strengthening. By nightfall, the system had an eye forming, wide as 5 miles (8.0 km). By nightfall, the system was up to winds of 90 mph (140 km/h) and passing far east of the Philippines. Opal continued the northwest progression, strengthening throughout the day of August 3 and forming a wider eye. By the end of the day, the storm was now a Category 3 typhoon with winds of 115 mph (185 km/h). Strengthening continued overnight as the typhoon passed to the east of Luzon, strengthening close to super typhoon status by nightfall on August 4 with a shrinking eye. The next morning, Typhoon Opal strengthened into the second super typhoon of the season, boasting sustained winds of 160 mph (260 km/h). During the day on August 5, Opal continued strengthening, peaking with winds of 165 mph (266 km/h) just east of Taiwan. (Operationally, Opal was classified as a 170 mph (270 km/h) typhoon, but this was downgraded to a 165 mph (266 km/h) in post-analysis.) Minimum recorded central pressures for Opal were registered at 900 millibars. Soon after peaking, the storm struck the island of Taiwan with winds of 165 mph (266 km/h). The storm weakened over land to 135 mph (217 km/h) after crossing the island and continued weakening into a 90 mph (140 km/h) typhoon as it made landfall in mainland China. The typhoon continued to weaken over land, weakening into a tropical storm on the morning of August 6. Opal persisted as a tropical storm on August 6, weakening into a tropical depression the next morning. During the afternoon of August 7, with influences from land, the storm became extratropical. The extratropical remains of Opal crossed eastern mainland China, entering the East China Sea in the late evening. Early in the morning of August 8, the storm struck North Korea near the capital city of Pyongyang. After crossing the country, the system reappeared in the sea before crossing. On the morning of August 9, the system made landfall on the Hokkaido region of Japan, near the town of Rumoi. After crossing the island, the storm entered the Sea of Okhotsk on August 10. During the afternoon, the system crossed the Kuril Islands and began a parallel with the Kamchatka Peninsula the next day. On the morning of August 13, the system entered the Aleutian Islands, passing west of Semisopochnoi Island and the Rat Islands before entering the Bering Sea. The extratropical remains disappeared on August 14 in the middle of the sea, just south of the Arctic Circle.

== Impact ==
The impact of Typhoon Opal was most devastating in Taiwan, where originally 87 deaths were reported on the island, with 20 people missing and over 1400 injured. Some 5,000 people were homeless in Yilan City. Nearly 1,500 homes were destroyed as a result of Opal, along with 4,700 others damaged due to the high winds. Huge waves kicked up by Opel also sent a storm surge into the city, sweeping away homes. However, by August 8, this number was demoted to only 12 deaths on the island, 966 injured and five people missing. The 170 mph (270 km/h) strong winds took a freighter off its anchors and swamping it, along with a number of fishing boats. Although winds of 110 mph (180 km/h) were felt in Taipei, no fatalities were reported because of ample warning, causing residents to evacuate. In Taipei, Opal caused streets to flood, uprooted trees and tore down telephone lines. 38 injuries were also reported, with 35 houses destroyed. 180 were also damaged in Taipei. Elsewhere, Opal caused two deaths in the islands of Japan, centered on the island of Southern Hokkaido. Nine people there were also injured and one person was reported missing. After Typhoon Opal passed through South Korea, seven fishermen were killed along the coast of the Yellow Sea. 72 more people were missing. Five ships were also sunk in the Yellow Sea, twelve more were reported missing. The estimated damage total came out to about $25 million (1962 USD; $184 million (2011 USD)). These totals came in the form of crop, transportation, and structural damage.

== See also ==
- Typhoon Amy (1962) - Took a similar track just a month later
