= List of storms named Amy =

The name Amy or Ami has been used for sixteen tropical cyclones worldwide: one in the Atlantic Ocean, two in the Australian region of the Indian Ocean, one in the South-West Indian Ocean, one in the South Pacific Ocean, and eleven in the Western Pacific Ocean. It has also been used for one European windstorm.

In the Atlantic:

- Hurricane Amy (1975), neared the coast of North Carolina before turning out to sea

In the Australian region:

- Cyclone Amy (1967)
- Cyclone Amy (1980), struck Western Australia as a Category 5 cyclone

In the South-West Indian Ocean:

- Tropical Storm Amy (1962), passed near Rodrigues and brushed St. Brandon

In the South Pacific:

- Cyclone Ami (2003) (10P, 5F), made landfall on Vanua Levu before subsequently crossing the western tip of Taveuni and then traversing the Lau Group

In the Western Pacific:

- Typhoon Amy (1951), struck the Central Philippines as a Category 4 typhoon
- Typhoon Amy (1956)
- Typhoon Amy (1959) (40W), struck Japan
- Typhoon Amy (1962), first made landfall in Taiwan as a Category 4 super typhoon, then in China as a typhoon; moved out into the South China Sea, and finally made landfall in South Korea as a tropical storm
- Typhoon Amy (1965) (07W, Elang), brushed Japan
- Typhoon Amy (1967) (27W), remained over the open ocean
- Typhoon Amy (1971) (05W, Etang), traversed the Caroline Islands as a Category 5-equivalent super typhoon
- Tropical Storm Amy (1974)
- Tropical Storm Amy (1977) (09W, Ibiang), hit Taiwan
- Typhoon Amy (1991) (07W, Gening), Category 4 typhoon that brushed southern Taiwan and then made landfall in southern China
- Tropical Storm Amy (1994) (15W), made landfall in Vietnam

In Europe:

- Storm Amy (2025), affected northern Europe
