= Ami =

AMI or Ami may refer to:

== Arts, entertainment and media ==
- AMI (Romanian singer), a Romanian singer and songwriter
- AMI-tv, a Canadian TV channel
  - AMI-télé, the French-language version
- AMI-audio, a Canadian audio broadcast TV service
- Ami Magazine, an Orthodox Jewish news magazine

== Businesses and organizations ==
- AMI Paris, a French luxury brand
- AMI Insurance, in New Zealand
- AMI Semiconductor, acquired by Onsemi
- AMI, a Lattice Company, a computer firmware company which was formerly known as American Megatrends, Inc.
- Accessible Media Inc., a Canadian media company for the visually impaired
- Advanced Machine Intelligence Labs, a French artificial intelligence company
- African Minerals Limited (AMI.L)
- Alternative Miss Ireland, a Dublin beauty pageant
- Amazon Malaria Initiative
- American Meat Institute, a trade association
- American Media, Inc., now A360media, a publisher
- American Microsystems, Inc., a semiconductor company
- American Monetary Institute, a non-profit
- American Mustache Institute, an advocacy organization
- Anugerah Musik Indonesia, an annual Indonesian music award ceremony
- Armes-Militaria-Informations, a Belgian magazine, later Fire
- Association of Municipalities for Independence (Associació de Municipis per la Independència), in Catalonia
- Association Montessori Internationale, a non-governmental organization
- Association of Medical Illustrators, an international organization for certification in medical illustration
- Australian Marketing Institute, a professional body
- Australian Motor Industries, a former automobile assembly firm

== People, ethnic groups and language ==
- Ami (given name), including a list of people and fictional characters with that name
- Ami people, an indigenous people of Taiwan
  - Ami or Amis language
- Ami language (Australia), a Marranj language

== Places ==
- Ami, Ibaraki, Japan
- Selaparang Airport, a defunct airport in Lombok, Indonesia, IATA code AMI
- AMI Stadium (disambiguation), several uses

== Science, technology and mathematics ==
- Amí, a word processing program
- Ami (camera), a Polish viewfinder camera
- Ami (spider), a synonym of Neischnocolus
- Acute myocardial infarction, a heart attack
- Adjusted mutual information, in information theory
- Advanced metering infrastructure, for energy smart metering
- Arcminute Microkelvin Imager, a pair of radio telescopes
- Amazon Machine Image, a special type of virtual appliance used to create a virtual machine
- Alternate-mark inversion, an encoding scheme for digital signals in telecommunications
- Ambient intelligence (AmI)

== Transportation ==
- Citroën Ami, a 1960s family car
- Citroën Ami (electric), a 2020s electric vehicle

== Other uses ==
- Cyclone Ami, in Fiji 2002–03

== See also ==
- Ammi (disambiguation)
- AAMI (disambiguation)
