= New South Wales Police Gazette and Weekly Record of Crime =

Former weekly police gazette, New South Wales, Australia

The New South Wales Police Gazette and Weekly Record of Crime was initially published on 2 January 1854 as the New South Wales Reports of Crime and published several times each week by the Office of the Inspector General of Police for distribution to all police stations. The NSW State Archives and Records described it as containing "details of crimes committed, persons to be apprehended, descriptions of stolen property and rewards offered, lists of regimental and ships deserters, and other police notices concerning recovery of property, apprehension of suspects previously sought, and dismissals of police officers for unsatisfactory conduct".

From 5 March 1862 the publication's title was changed to the New South Wales Police Gazette and Weekly Record of Crime. It was published weekly and said to contain the substance of information received in cases of felony and misdemeanors with description of offenders, &c. and every particular which may lead to their apprehension".

The Gazette continued to be published until 14 July 1982.

== Digitisation ==
The Gazette has been digitised and made available on Trove, the online repository of digital collections of the National Library of Australia, from 4 June 1862, to 31 December 1930.

Issues of the Gazette after 1930 are currently not publicly available, although access to issues up to and including 1938 can be achieved by means of paid subscription to the online Ancestry genealogy service .
