= AMI Stadium =

AMI Stadium may refer to:

- Lancaster Park or Jade Stadium, a sports stadium damaged in the 2011 Christchurch earthquake, demolished in 2018
- Rugby League Park or Christchurch Stadium, a rugby football stadium also in Christchurch, New Zealand
