= 1933 Atlantic hurricane season =

- Season summary map

Seasonal boundaries
- First system formed: May 14, 1933
- Last system dissipated: November 17, 1933

Strongest storm
- Name: Fourteen
  - Maximum winds: 160 mph (260 km/h) (1-minute sustained)
  - Lowest pressure: 929 mbar (hPa; 27.43 inHg)

Seasonal statistics
- Total storms: 20
- Hurricanes: 11
- Major hurricanes (Cat. 3+): 6
- ACE: 258.57 (record high)
- Total fatalities: 651
- Total damage: $86.1 million (1933 USD)

Related articles
- 1933 Pacific hurricane season; 1920-1937 Pacific typhoon seasons; 1930s North Indian Ocean cyclone seasons

The 1933 Atlantic hurricane season was the most active Atlantic hurricane season on record in terms of accumulated cyclone energy (ACE), with a total of 258.57. It also set a record for nameable tropical storms in a single season, 20, which stood for the time being until 2005, when there were 28 storms. (Note: In addition to 2005, the only Atlantic seasons with an equal number or more named storms than 1933 were 2020, 2021 and 2023.) The season ran for six months of 1933, with tropical cyclone development occurring as early as May and as late as November. A system was active for all but 13 days from June 28 to October 7.

Because technologies such as Earth observation satellites were not available until the 1960s, historical data on tropical cyclones from the early 20th century is often incomplete. Tropical cyclones that did not approach populated areas or shipping lanes, especially if they were relatively weak and of short duration, may have remained undetected. Compensating for the lack of comprehensive observation and the limited technological ability to monitor all tropical cyclone activity in the Atlantic Basin during this era, research meteorologist Christopher Landsea estimates that the 1933 season may have produced an additional 2–3 missed tropical cyclones. A 2013 reanalysis of the 1933 Atlantic Hurricane Database did indeed identify two new tropical storms; however, it was also determined that two existing cyclones did not reach tropical storm intensity and so were removed from the database. Additionally, researchers found two existing storms to be one continuous system. As a result, the season storm total dropped from 21 to 20.

Of the season's 20 documented tropical storms, 11 attained hurricane status. Six of those were major hurricanes, with sustained winds of over 111 mph (179 km/h). Two of the hurricanes reached winds of 160 mph (260 km/h), which is a Category 5 on the modern Saffir–Simpson scale. (Note: The Saffir-Simpson hurricane wind scale was developed in 1971, and has been retroactively applied to the entirety of the Atlantic hurricane database.) The season produced several deadly storms, with eight storms killing more than 20 people. All but 3 of the 20 known storms affected land at some point during their durations.

== Season summary ==
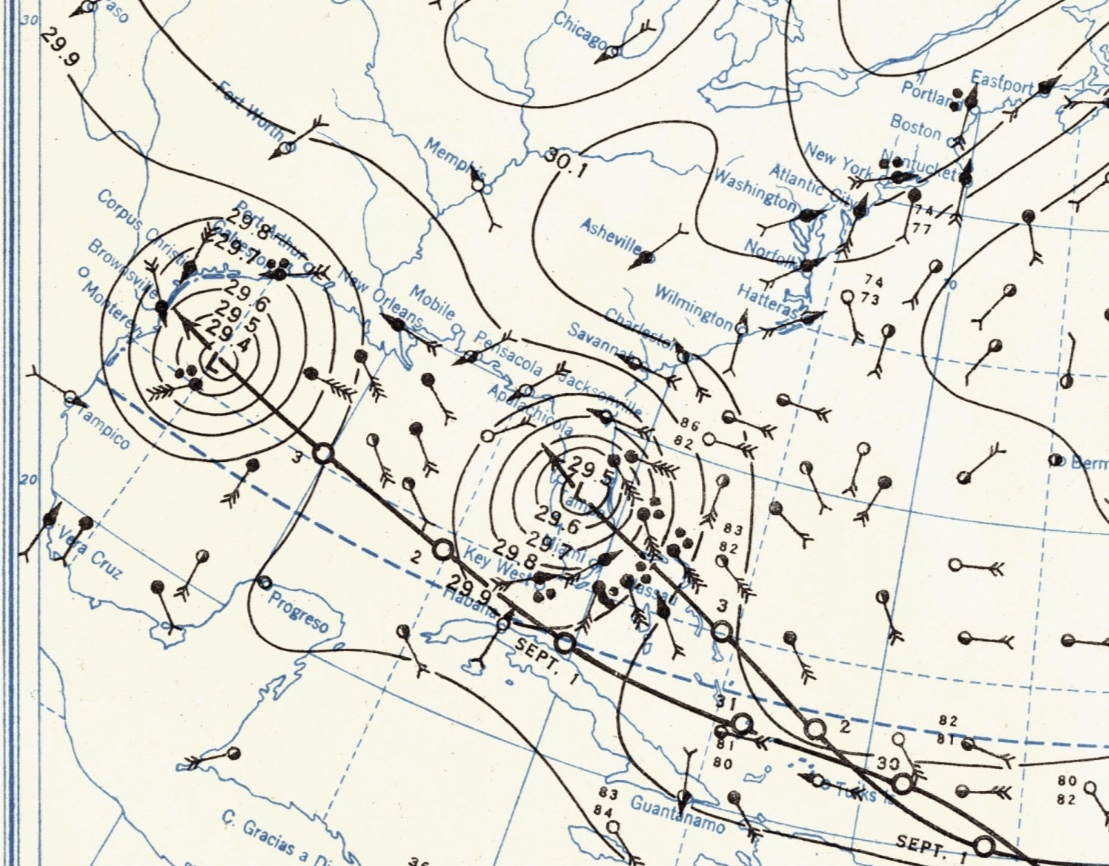
Weather map on September 4, showing two hurricanes hitting the U.S., one approaching Southern Texas and the other over Florida

The 1933 season was the most active of its time, surpassing the previous record-holder of 19 storms in 1887. Fifteen of the season's storms made landfall as tropical cyclones, and another struck land as extratropical storms. Eight tropical storms, including six hurricanes, hit the United States during the season, including the Chesapeake–Potomac hurricane, which the U.S. Weather Bureau described as one of the most severe in history to impact the Mid-Atlantic States. Seven tropical storms, including four hurricanes, hit Mexico, two of which caused severe damage in the Tampico area.

The season was continuously active, with six storms forming during the month of August alone. At the time, many storms received the distinction of being the earliest nth storm to form, such as the earliest fifth tropical storm to form in a season. Most of the records were broken in later years. During the season, the U.S. Weather Bureau issued storm and hurricane warnings for eight storms, including coastal portions of Texas, as well as from Florida to Massachusetts, forcing the evacuations of thousands of people. The deadliest storm of the season was a hurricane that struck Tampico, Mexico, killing over 184 residents. The costliest hurricane was the Chesapeake–Potomac hurricane, which caused $27 million in damage from North Carolina to New Jersey. (Note: All damage totals are in 1933 United States dollars unless otherwise noted.) The hurricane produced rainfall that resulted in severe crop damage in Maryland.

In addition to the 20 tropical storms, there were several tropical depressions of lesser intensity. The first developed on June 1 in the northwest Caribbean and dissipated a few days later. Another depression developed on July 11 over Panama and also quickly dissipated. A tropical depression developed on July 17 in the northeastern Atlantic west of the Azores, and one ship reported hurricane-force winds; however, there was little evidence that the tropical system was organized, so it was not classified as a tropical storm. Originally, there was a tropical storm in the database in the Caribbean in the middle of August, but it was downgraded to a tropical depression due to lack of any reports of gale-force winds. Similarly, there was a tropical storm in the database in late September, but it was also downgraded to a tropical depression due to lack of gale-force winds.

The season produced the highest accumulated cyclone energy (ACE) on record, with a total of 259, versus the 1931–1943 average of 91.2. ACE is a metric used to express the energy used by a tropical cyclone during its lifetime. Therefore, a storm with a longer duration will have high values of ACE. It is only calculated at six-hour increments in which specific tropical and subtropical systems are either at or above sustained wind speeds of 39 mph (63 km/h), which is the threshold for tropical storm intensity. Thus, tropical depressions are not included here. Originally, 1933 had an operational ACE of 213. Later however, the Atlantic hurricane reanalysis project found that several storms in 1933 were stronger than initially reported.

== Systems ==
=== Tropical Storm One ===
- Tropical storm (SSHWS)
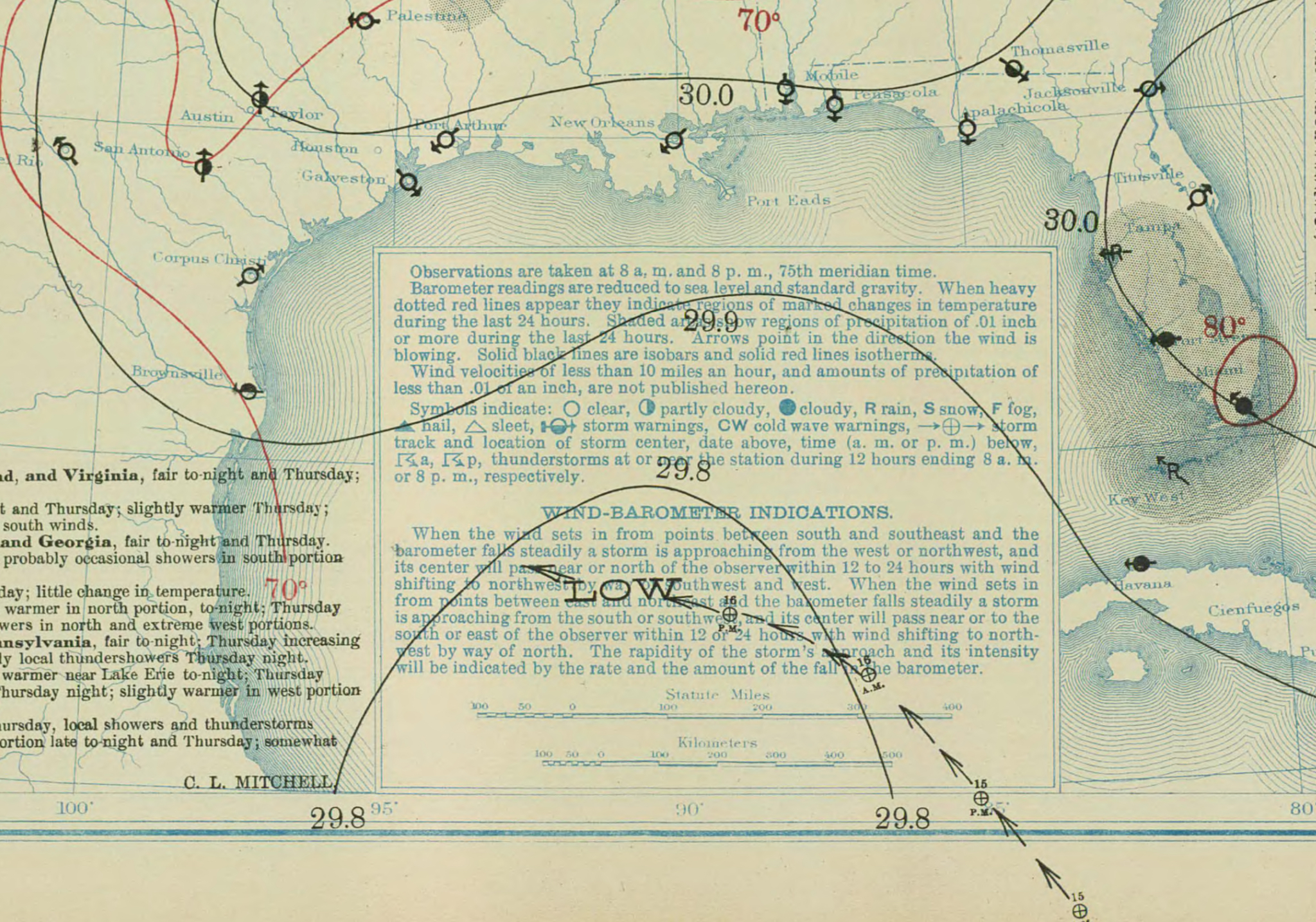
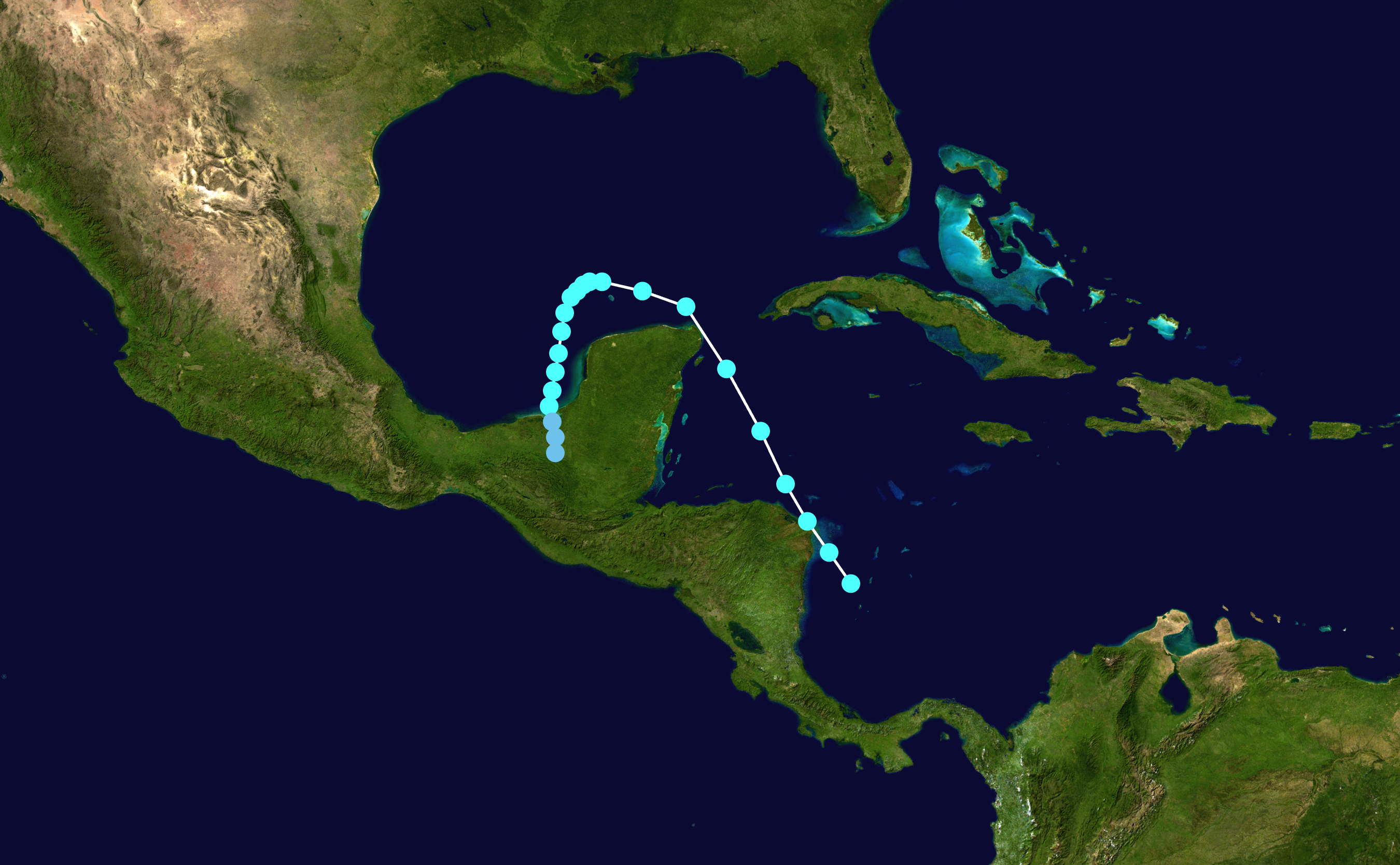
- Duration: May 14 – May 19
- Peak intensity: 50 mph (85 km/h) (1-min); 1001 mbar (hPa)

The first storm of the season formed on May 14 in the southwestern Caribbean Sea off the east coast of Nicaragua. It moved quickly to the north-northwest, passing just northeast of the eastern tip of Honduras. On May 15, the storm turned to the west and entered the Gulf of Mexico while moving around the Yucatán Peninsula. The next day, it attained peak winds of 50 mph (80 km/h), based on a ship report. Turning southward, the storm made landfall on Ciudad del Carmen in Mexico early on May 19 with winds of 40 mph (64 km/h). It dissipated over land later that day.

=== Hurricane Two ===
- Category 2 hurricane (SSHWS)
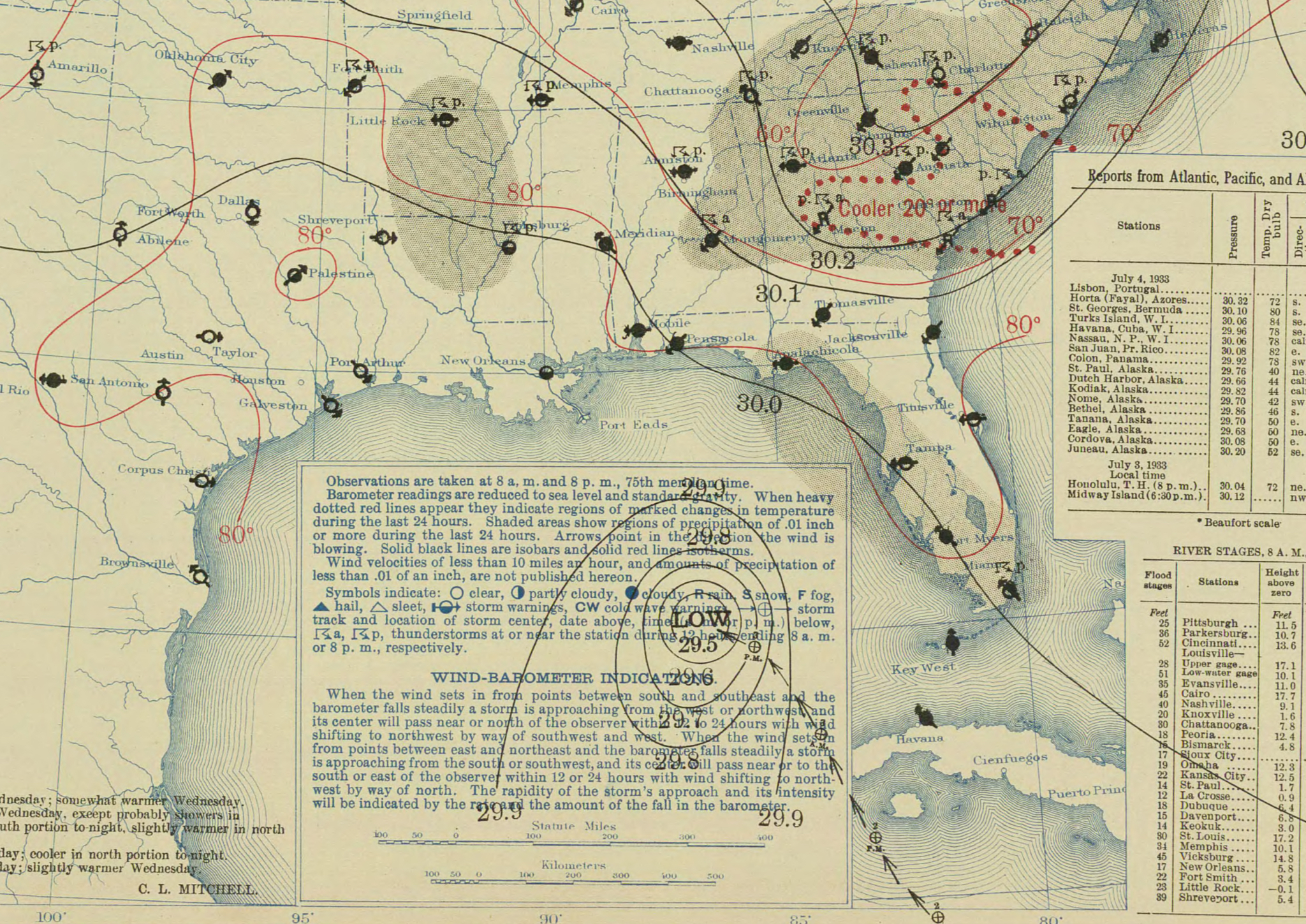
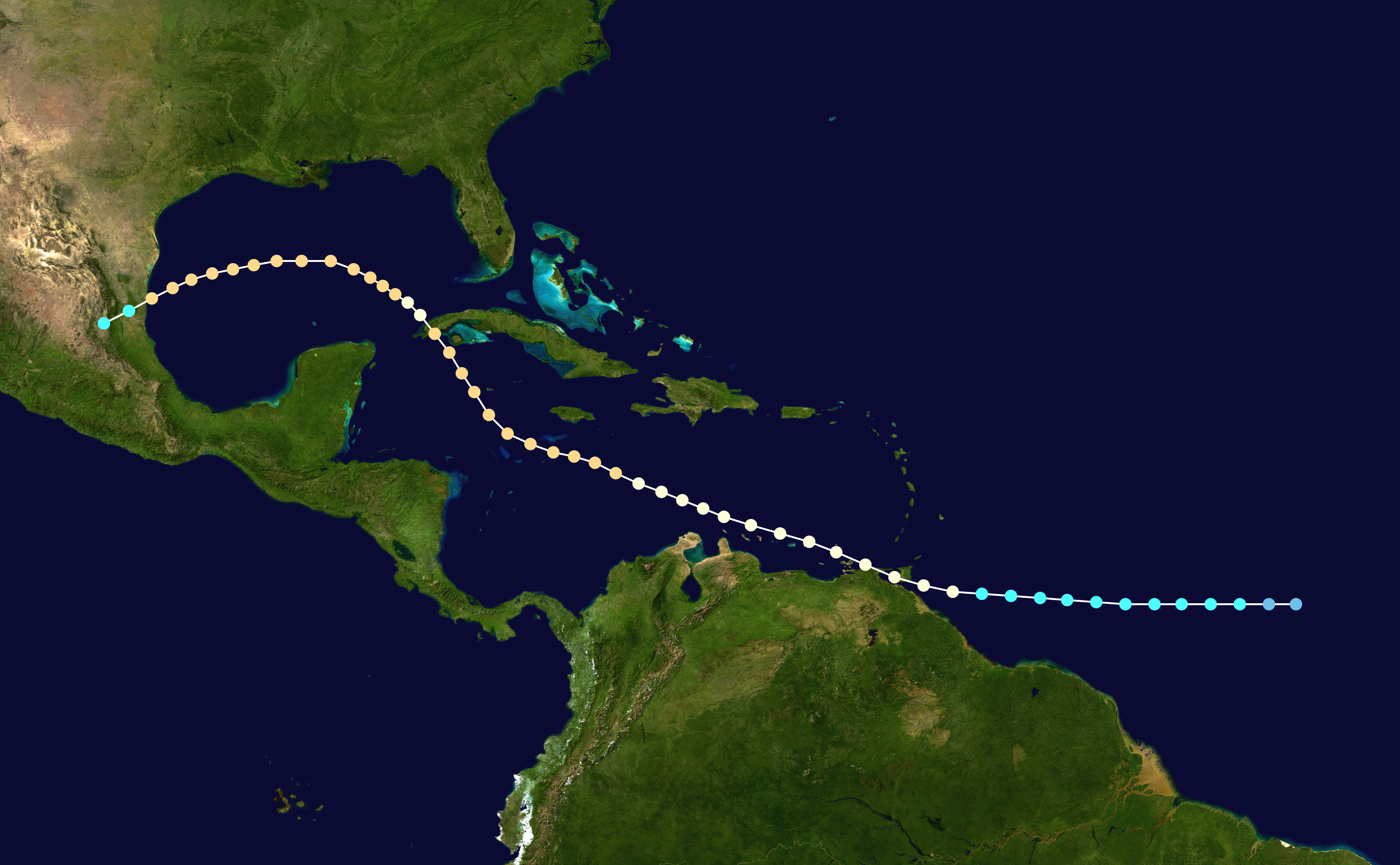
- Duration: June 24 – July 8
- Peak intensity: 110 mph (175 km/h) (1-min); ≤965 mbar (hPa)

A westward-moving tropical wave spawned a tropical depression on June 24 about halfway between the southern Lesser Antilles and the coast of Africa. The depression quickly intensified into a tropical storm, and by June 27 it became a hurricane off the northern coast of Guyana. At 2100 UTC that day, the hurricane struck extreme southern Trinidad with winds of 85 mph (137 km/h). After crossing the island, the hurricane moved across the Paria Peninsula in northeastern Venezuela with the same intensity. The hurricane was earliest to affect the region on record, and was the first storm in over 50 years to affected Trinidad and Venezuela. In Trinidad, 13 people were killed, about 1,000 people were left homeless, and damage was estimated at $3 million. In Venezuela, the hurricane caused power outages, destroyed several houses, and killed several people.

After crossing Venezuela into the eastern Caribbean, the hurricane moved northwestward and gradually intensified. On July 3 it struck western Cuba with winds of 100 mph (160 km/h). In the country, the storm killed 22 people, while damage amounted to $4 million. A building high pressure area turned the hurricane westward in the Gulf of Mexico, and after further strengthening the storm attained peak winds of 110 mph (180 km/h) on July 5. It turned to the west-southwest and made landfall in northeastern Mexico on July 7 with winds of 100 mph (160 km/h), about halfway between Tampico and the Mexico/United States border. It dissipated about 11 hours later over Mexico. There were several deaths and heavy damage in the area where the storm moved ashore. Across its path, the hurricane killed 35 people.

=== Tropical Storm Three ===
- Tropical storm (SSHWS)
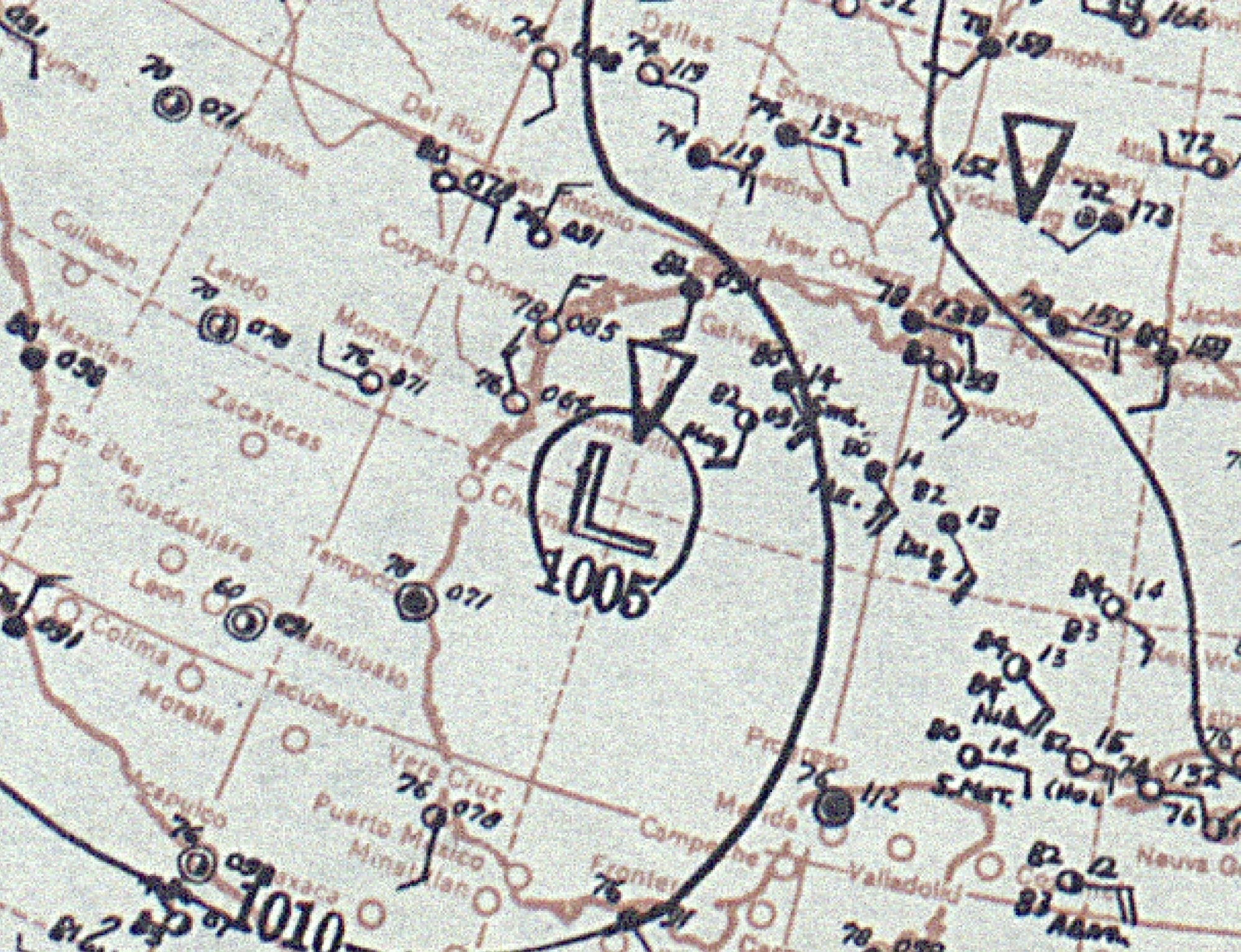
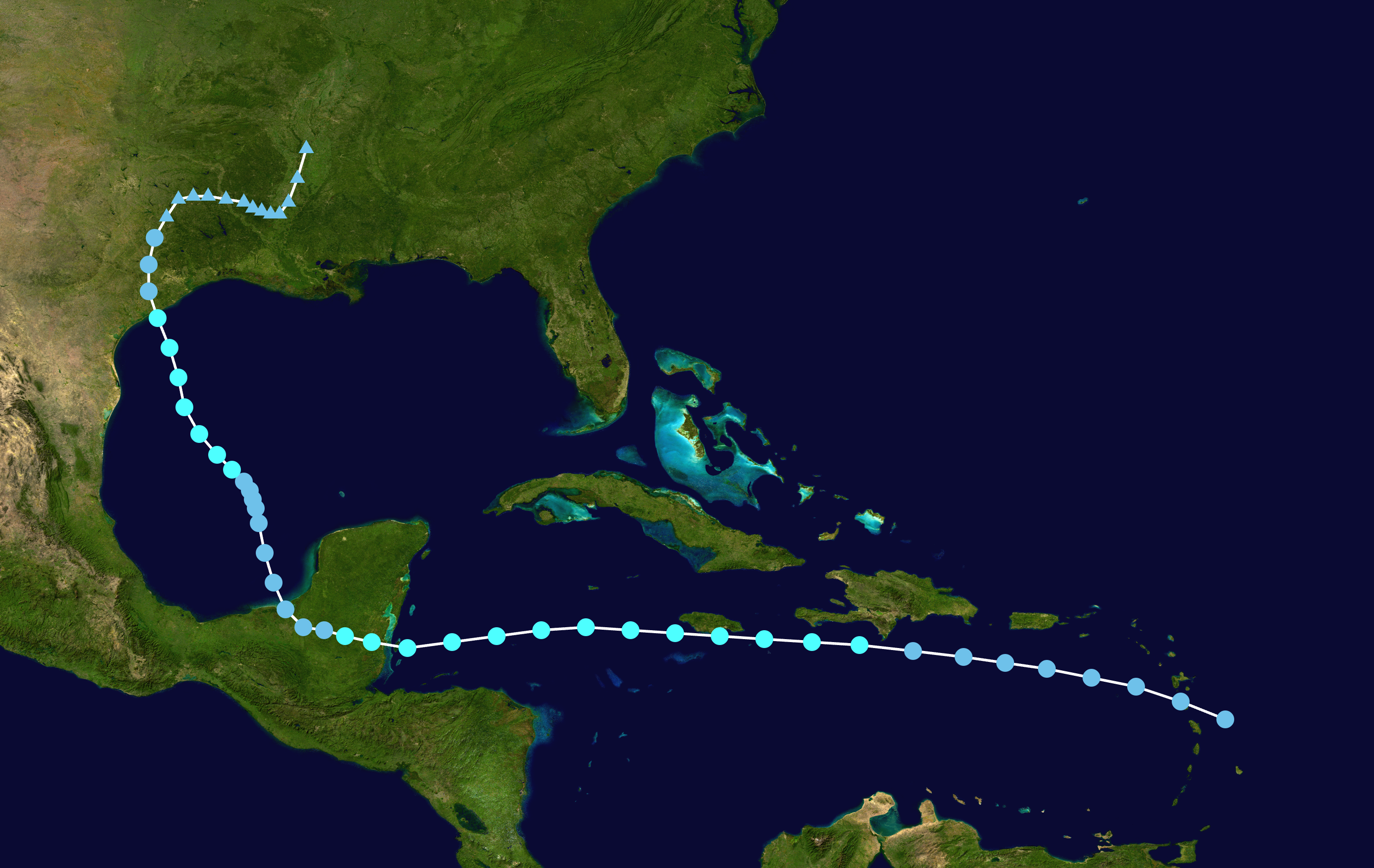
- Duration: July 14 – July 23
- Peak intensity: 50 mph (85 km/h) (1-min); 999 mbar (hPa)

On July 14, a tropical depression developed near Saint Kitts. (Note: Due to lack of observations, the Atlantic hurricane reanalysis project noted that the depression could have formed on July 13.) Moving generally westward, it passed south of Hispaniola on July 15, and strengthened into a tropical storm a day later. After passing south of Jamaica, the storm reached peak winds of 50 mph (85 km/h) early on July 18, with an estimated pressure of 999 mbar (29.5 inHg). Around 1500 UTC on July 18, the storm made landfall near Belize City, British Honduras, at its peak intensity. After moving ashore, the storm quickly weakened into a tropical depression while crossing the Yucatán Peninsula. Late on July 19, it emerged into the Bay of Campeche. (Note: Originally, the storm was assessed as two separate storms. The first was considered to have dissipated over Veracruz, Mexico on July 19, and the second was thought to have formed on July 21 in the Gulf of Mexico. The Atlantic hurricane reanalysis project merged the tracks together in 2012.) It turned to the northwest and re-intensified into a tropical storm on July 21. At around 0800 UTC on July 23, the storm moved ashore on Matagorda Bay in southeastern Texas with winds of about 45 mph (75 km/h). It weakened into a tropical depression and later drifted eastward over eastern Texas. On July 24, the depression became extratropical after interacting with a cold front, and it was absorbed by the front on July 27 along the border of Arkansas and Mississippi.

In Jamaica, rainfall reached 9 in (230 mm), causing flooding and landslides. The floods wrecked a bridge while also damaging roads and telegraph lines, and the winds knocked down banana trees. The storm also dropped heavy rainfall in eastern Texas and northwestern Louisiana, peaking at 21.3 in (540 mm) in Logansport, Louisiana. Logansport also reported a 24‑hour total of 18 in (460 mm), which set the record for the highest daily rainfall total there in July. Shreveport in the same state observed 12.4 in (310 mm) of rain in 24 hours, which was the highest daily total on record for the site as of 2008. It was the city's worst recorded floods related to a tropical cyclone. Alexandria also broke its 24‑hour rainfall record in July with a total of 9.75 in (248 mm) on July 25. A severe thunderstorm damaged roofs and windows in the city. In Texas, more than 10 in (250 mm) of rainfall caused flooding, which washed out a bridge in Henderson and portions of the Santa Fe Railway line between Carthage and Longview. Five people required rescue after being trapped in a fast-moving river. Damaged reached $1.5 million across Shelby and Panola counties. The rains caused crop damage in Texas and Louisiana. The rains caused many streams to exceed their banks, including one creek near Converse that flooded roads and railways. The floods forced families to evacuate in low-lying areas of northern Louisiana. Heavy rains also spread into southern Arkansas and northwestern Mississippi.

=== Tropical Storm Four ===
- Tropical storm (SSHWS)
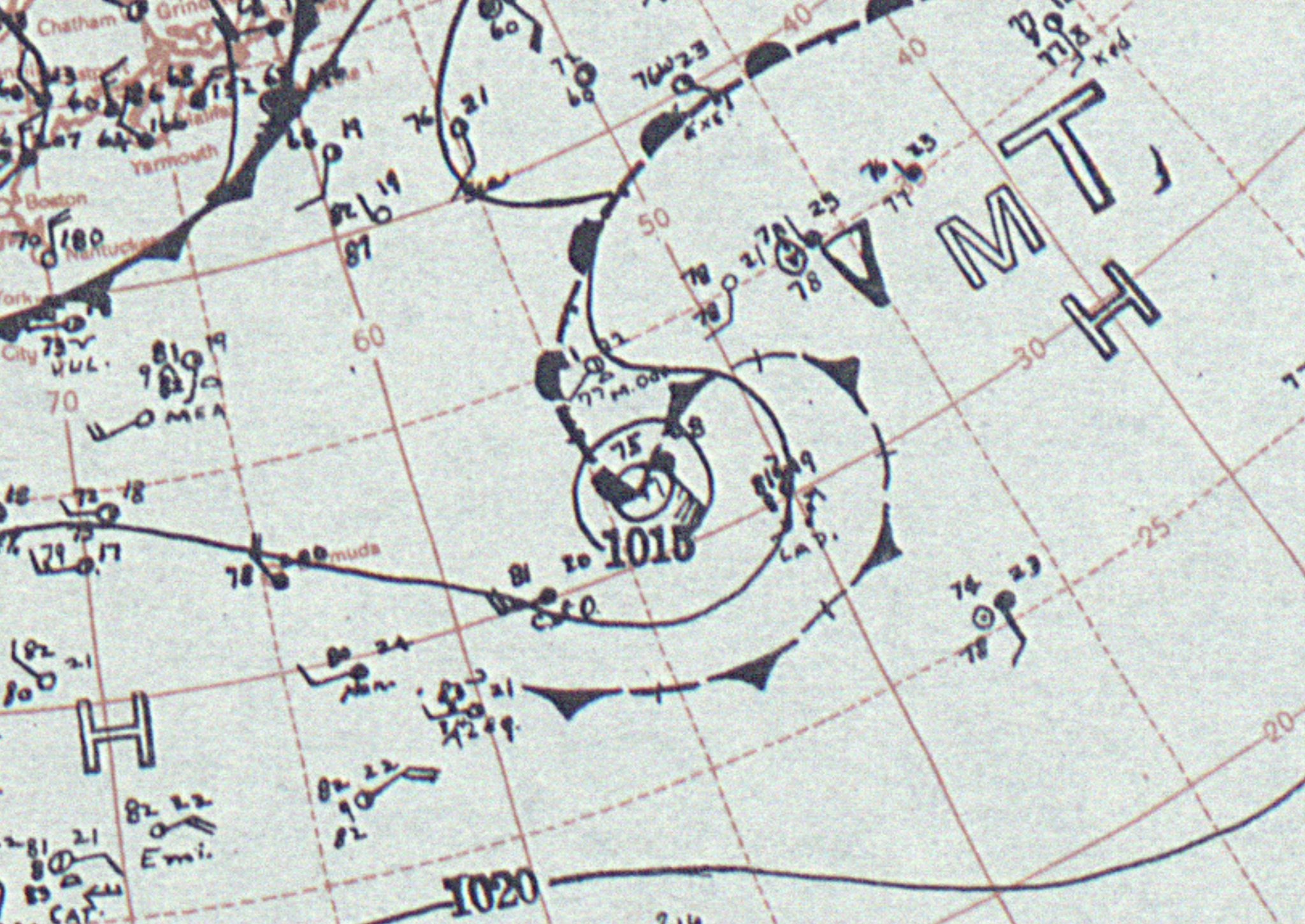
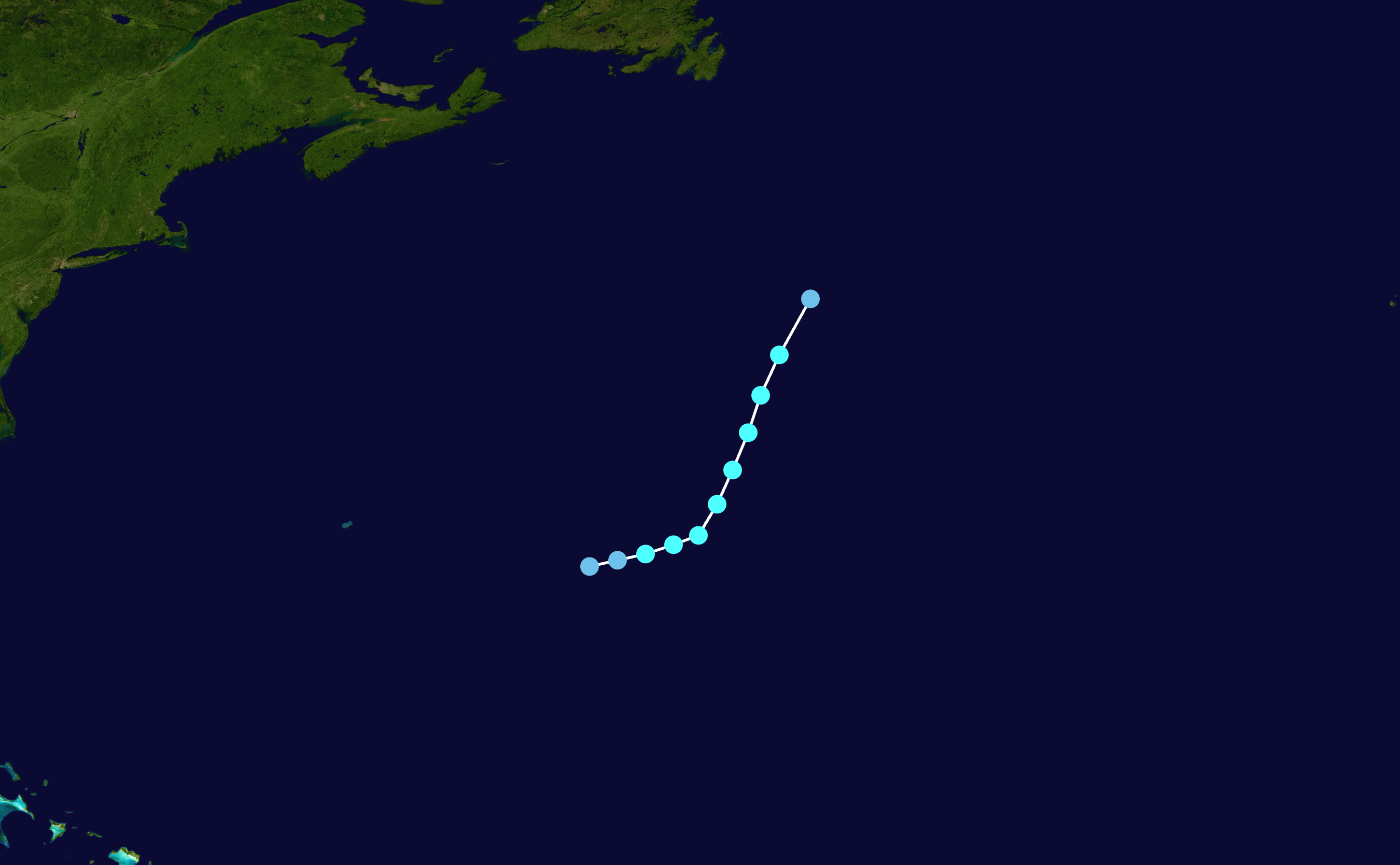
- Duration: July 24 – July 27
- Peak intensity: 60 mph (95 km/h) (1-min); 1008 mbar (hPa)

A dissipating cold front spawned a tropical depression east of Bermuda on July 24. It moved east-northeastward initially, and intensified into a tropical storm early on July 25. Based on ship observations, it is estimated the storm attained peak winds of 60 mph (97 km/h). The storm turned to the northeast and was absorbed by a cold front southeast of Newfoundland early on July 27.

=== Hurricane Five ===
- Category 1 hurricane (SSHWS)
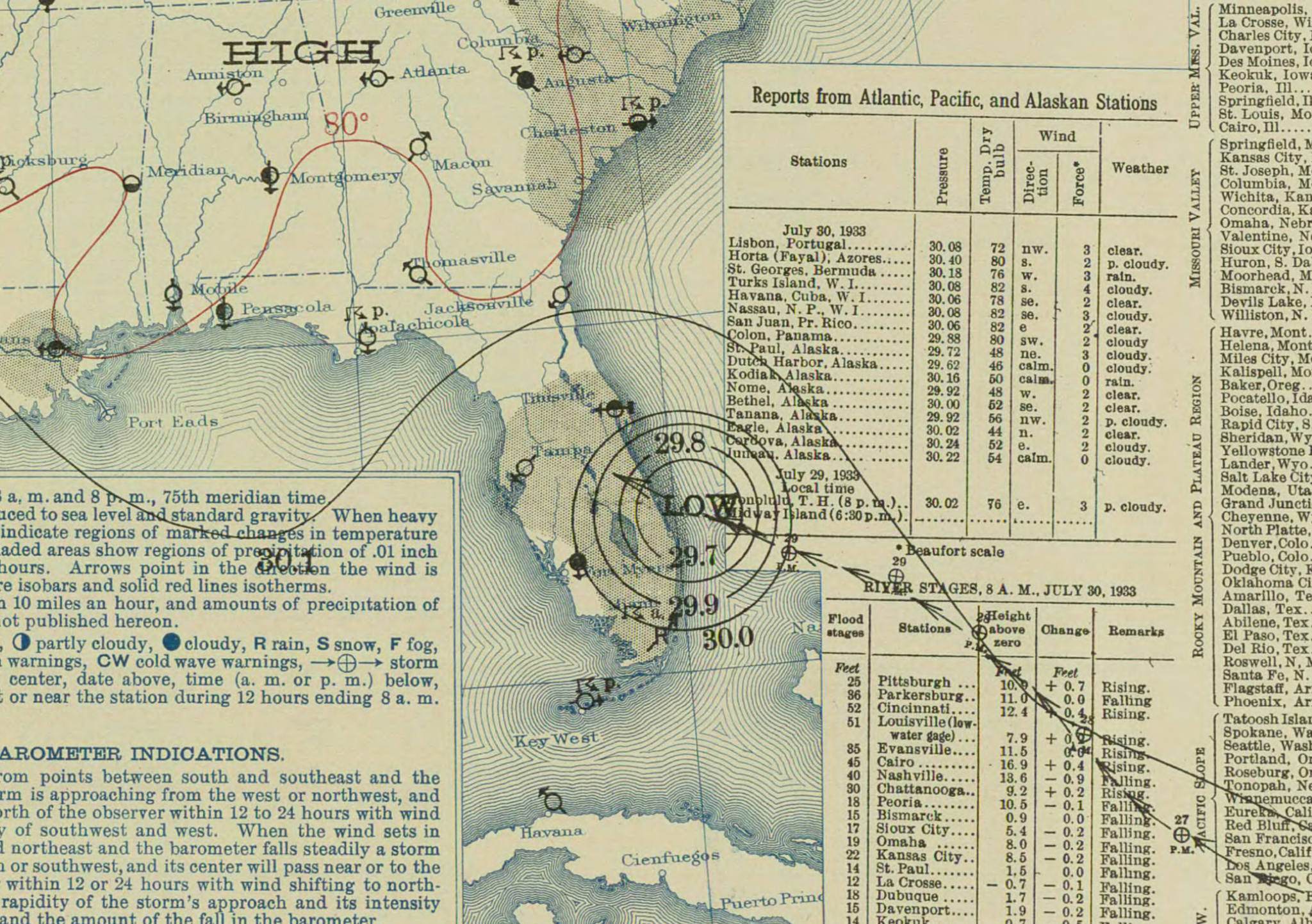
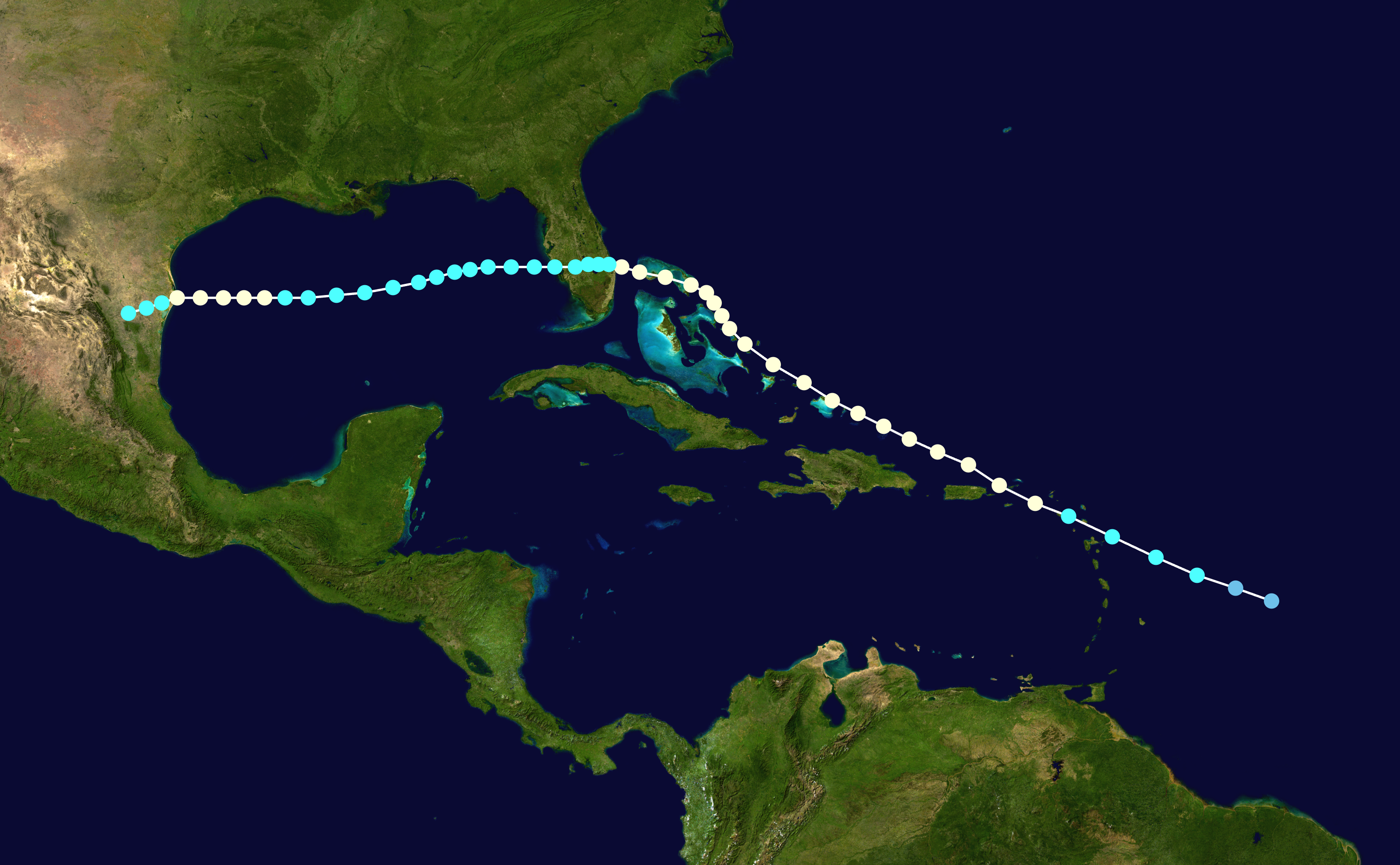
- Duration: July 24 – August 5
- Peak intensity: 90 mph (150 km/h) (1-min); 975 mbar (hPa)

On July 24, a tropical storm was detected. Located to the southeast of Antigua, it tracked west-northwestward and strengthened, attaining hurricane status over the Leeward Islands; it passed near Saba and St. Thomas with winds of 85 mph (137 km/h). The storm continued its west-northwest movement the next day north of Puerto Rico, later bypassing the Turks and Caicos Islands. After moving through the northern Bahamas, the hurricane struck near Hobe Sound, Florida, with winds of 75 mph (121 km/h). The hurricane crossed the state and weakened to minimal tropical storm intensity. It turned to the west-southwest and re-strengthened to a hurricane on August 4 off the coast of Texas. After peaking with winds of 90 mph (140 km/h), it made landfall just south of the Mexico–United States border on August 5. The system rapidly dissipated over northern Mexico.

Some islands of the Lesser Antilles experienced light rainfall, abnormally low atmospheric pressures, and gusty winds. While moving over Saint Christopher, the storm killed six people. Heavy rain was reported throughout the Virgin Islands. The hurricane caused the drowning of one person in the Bahamas, and moderate winds produced severe structural damage to the buildings in the archipelago. In Florida, the National Weather Bureau issued storm warnings between Miami to Titusville, while Governor David Sholtz issued a mandatory evacuation for 4,200 residents in vulnerable areas around Lake Okeechobee. Damage in Florida was minimal, limited to minor crops, roofs, and signs. In southern Texas, the hurricane produced moderate damage of $500,000, including disrupted telephone and telegraph lines. The hurricane produced high tides along the coast of Texas, covering parts of South Padre Island, and heavy rains in northern Mexico caused heavy damage.

=== Hurricane Six ===
- Category 4 hurricane (SSHWS)
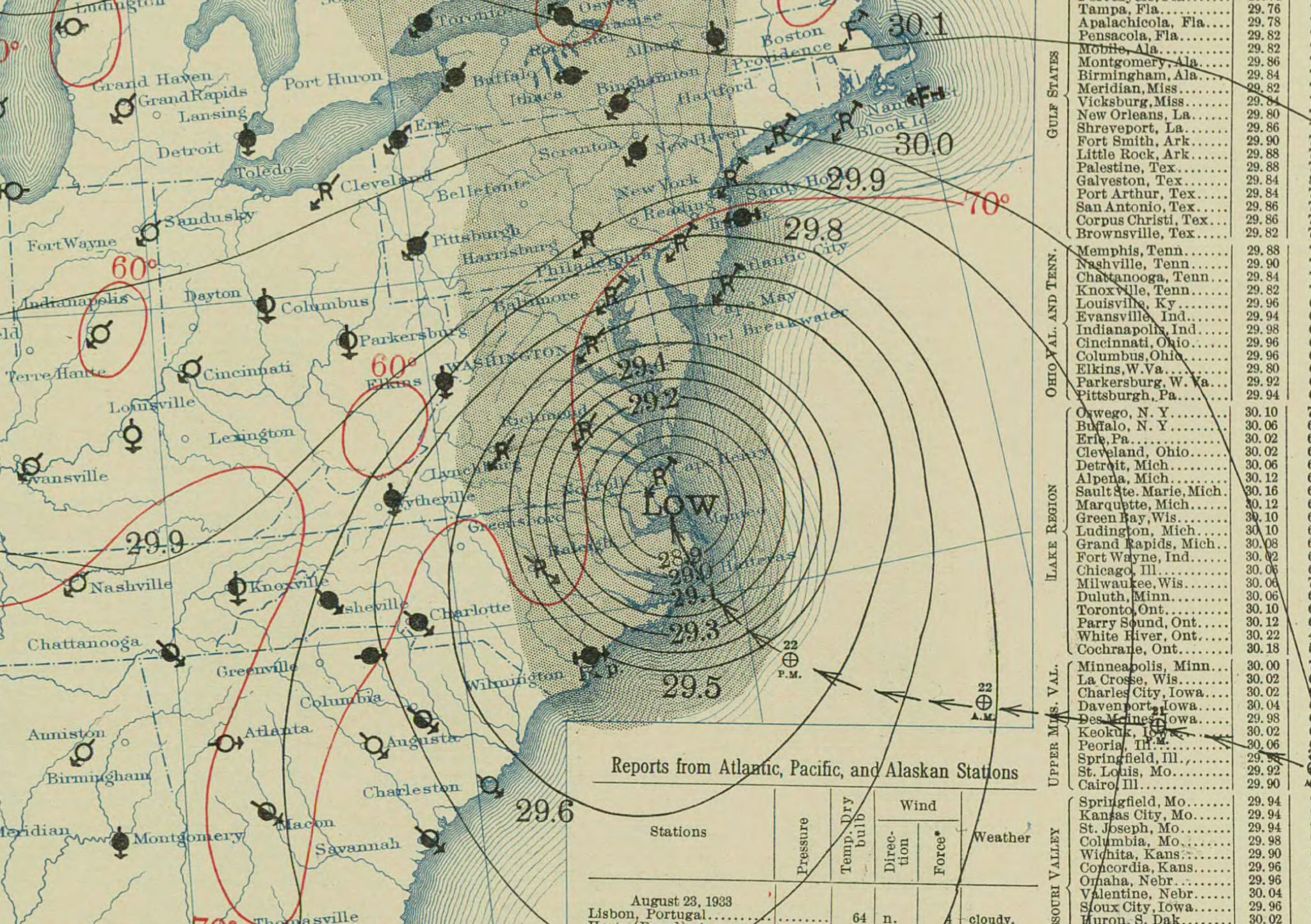
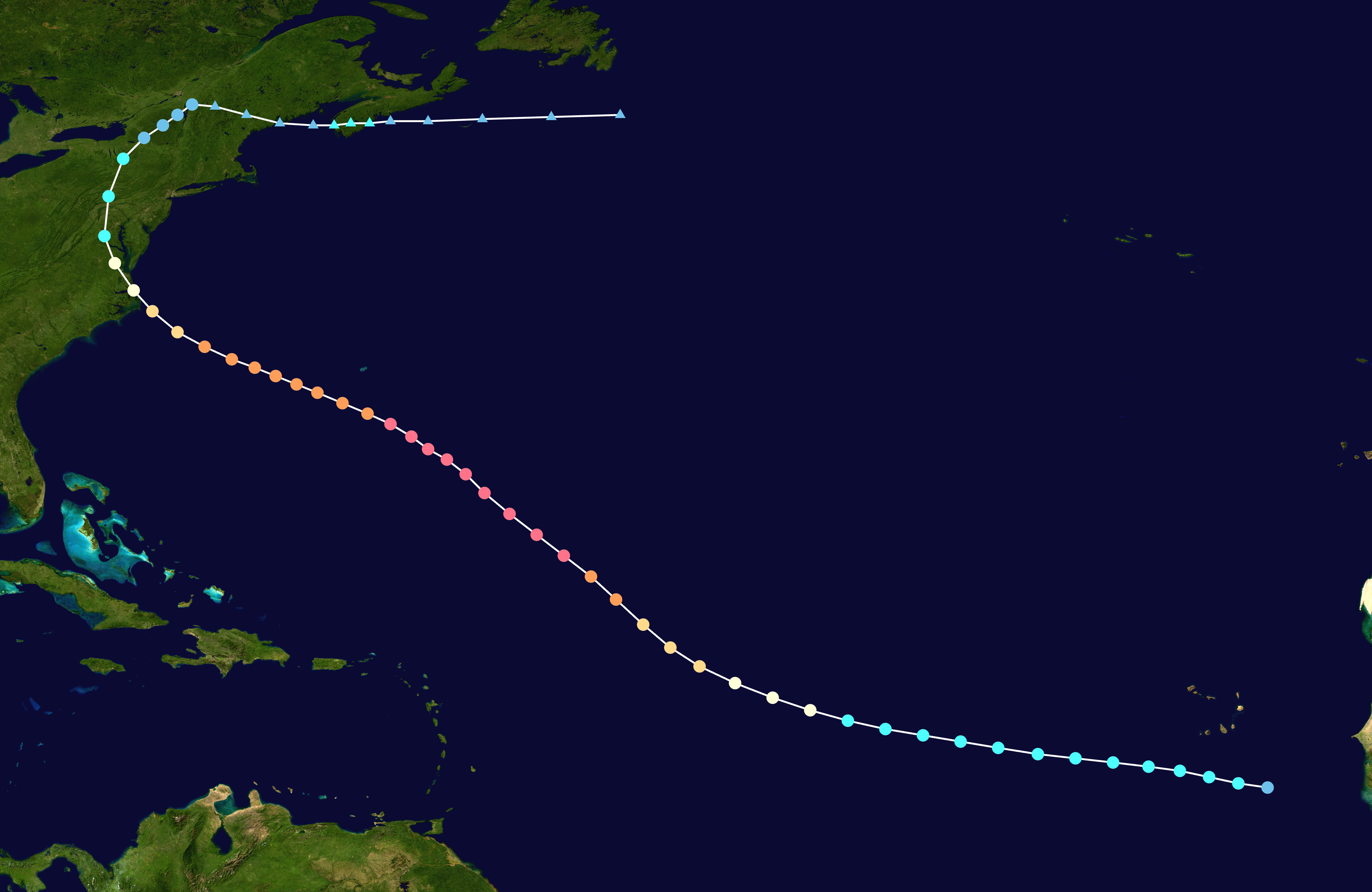
- Duration: August 13 – August 25
- Peak intensity: 140 mph (220 km/h) (1-min); <940 mbar (hPa)

A ship first reported a tropical depression near the Cape Verde islands on August 13. This system would become one of the most destructive hurricanes of the season. The storm moved towards the northwest and attained hurricane status on August 16. The hurricane continued to strengthen, and on August 21, it passed about 150 miles (240 km) southwest of Bermuda as a Category 3 hurricane. St. George's avoided a direct hit but reported wind speeds of up to 64 mph (103 km/h). On August 22, the hurricane turned west-northwest and reached its peak intensity, with maximum sustained winds of 140 mph (230 km/h), equivalent to a Category 4 hurricane in the modern-day Saffir-Simpson Hurricane Scale. However, it weakened quickly afterwards. On August 23, the storm made landfall on the Outer Banks of North Carolina as a Category 1 hurricane and continued to quickly weaken as it moved inland, away from its energy source. The storm turned to the north, then to the northeast, passing through Virginia, Maryland, and Pennsylvania before weakening to a tropical depression over New York. The storm became extratropical on August 25 and turned to the east, moving through Atlantic Canada and dissipating on August 28.

The hurricane caused damage ranging from moderate to severe in the corridor between North Carolina and New Jersey, due to high tides and strong winds. In the state of Maryland, the storm's effects resulted in severe crop damage, and many boats and piers were damaged or destroyed due to high tides and storm surge. This tide is notable as the one that separated Ocean City, MD from Assateague & Chincoteague Islands and allowed for the current harbor and inlet to the Atlantic as well as destroying the only rail bridge to the town, which was never rebuilt. The hurricane produced heavy rainfall along its path, with a peak of 13.28 inches (337 mm) in York, Pennsylvania. Overall, the hurricane caused $27 million in damage and 31 deaths.

=== Tropical Storm Seven ===
- Tropical storm (SSHWS)
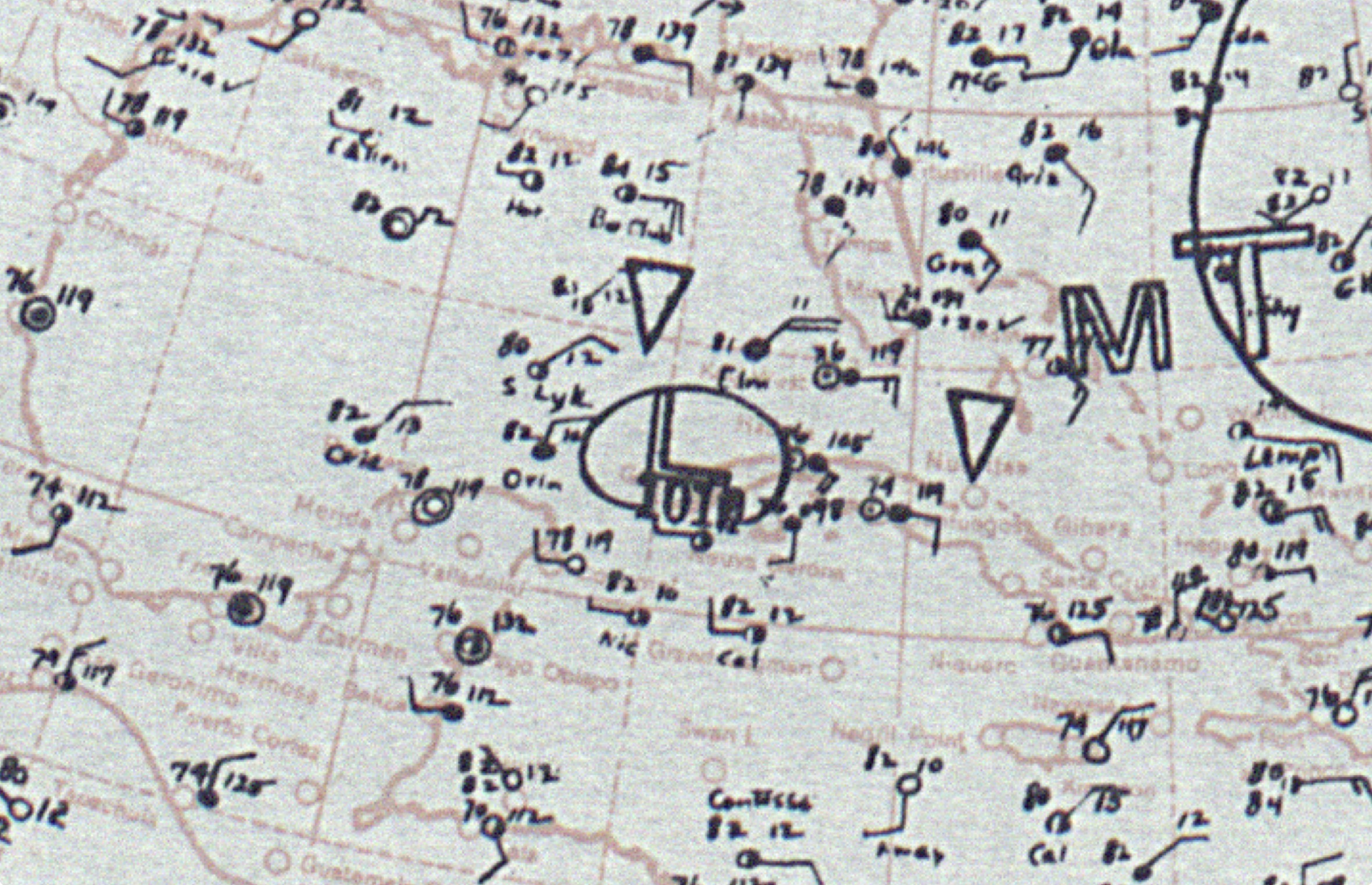
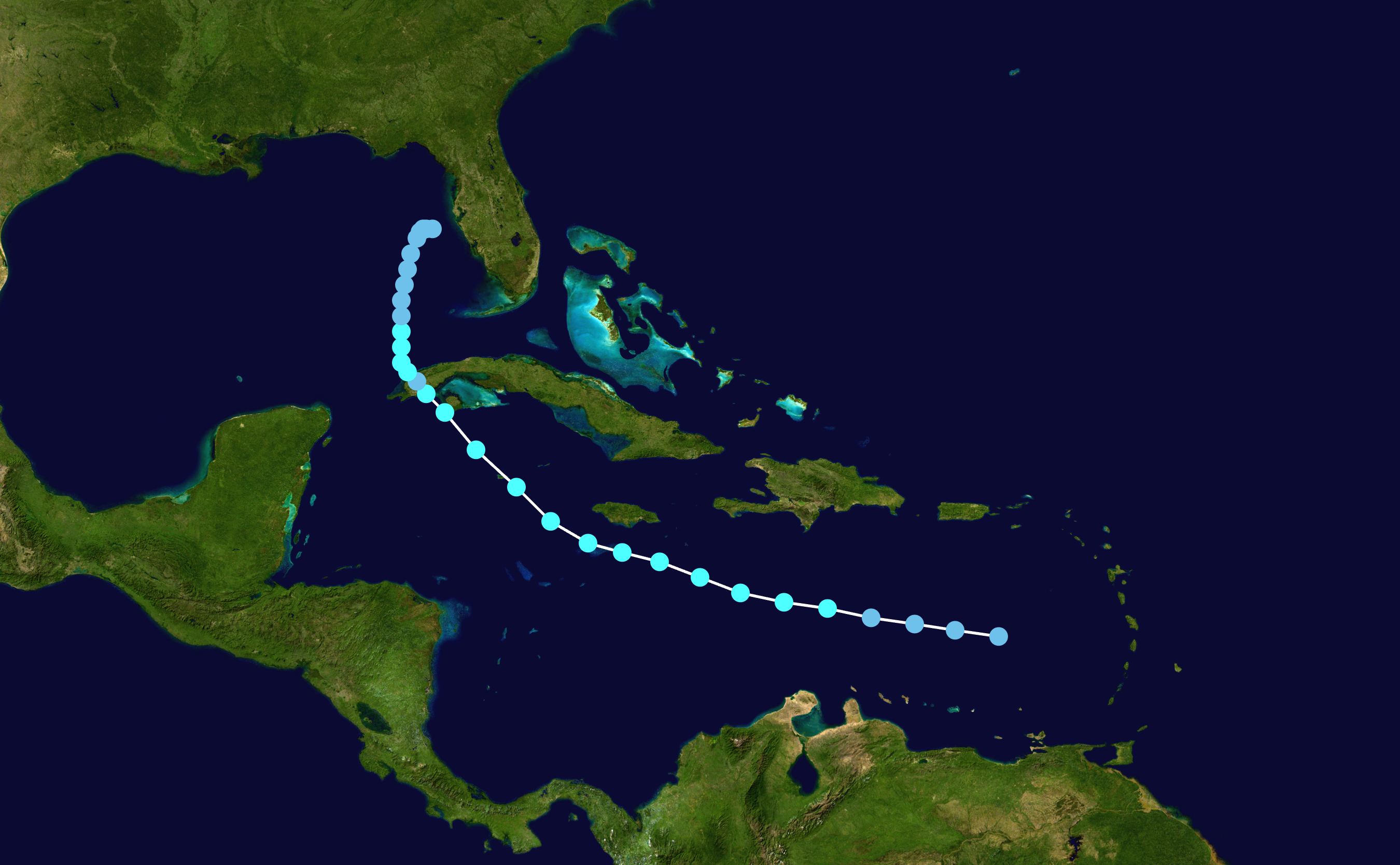
- Duration: August 14 – August 21
- Peak intensity: 45 mph (75 km/h) (1-min); 1007 mbar (hPa)

The seventh tropical storm of the season was first observed in the eastern Caribbean on August 14. It strengthened to reach winds of 45 mph (72 km/h). After passing just south of Jamaica, the storm turned to the northwest and crossed over both the Isle of Youth and western Cuba on August 18. It curved northward and dissipated west of Florida on August 21.

On Trinidad, rainfall from this storm and a subsequent tropical depression were the heaviest in nine years, which caused rivers to overflow and flooded parts of the island. Several boats were damaged or driven ashore from rough seas. The two storms caused damage to fields, highways, and houses, and caused the loss of crops such as cocoa and bananas. In all, damage totaled $3 million and there were 13 deaths on Trinidad. The storm produced heavy rainfall in eastern Jamaica, including a record 24-hour total of 12.2 inches (310 mm) in the Corporate Area, and Dallas Castle received 20.2 inches (510 mm) in 24 hours. This flooded and damaged properties and water systems in Kingston and Saint Andrew, leading to a water famine until the water mains were fixed. Damage totaled to over $2.5 million, and 70 people were reported killed due to the flooding. Damage was minimal in both Cuba and Florida.

=== Hurricane Eight ===
- Category 5 hurricane (SSHWS)
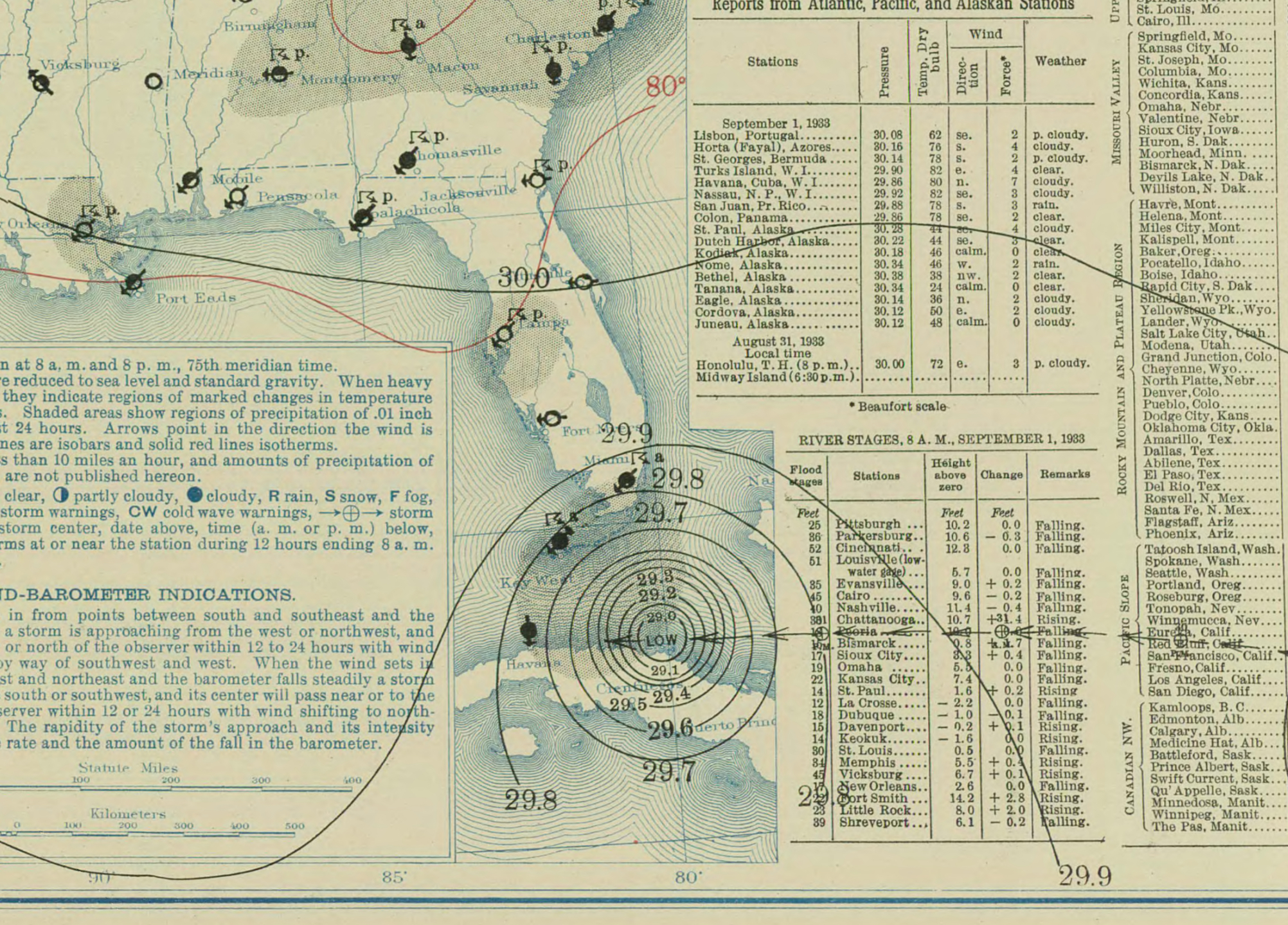
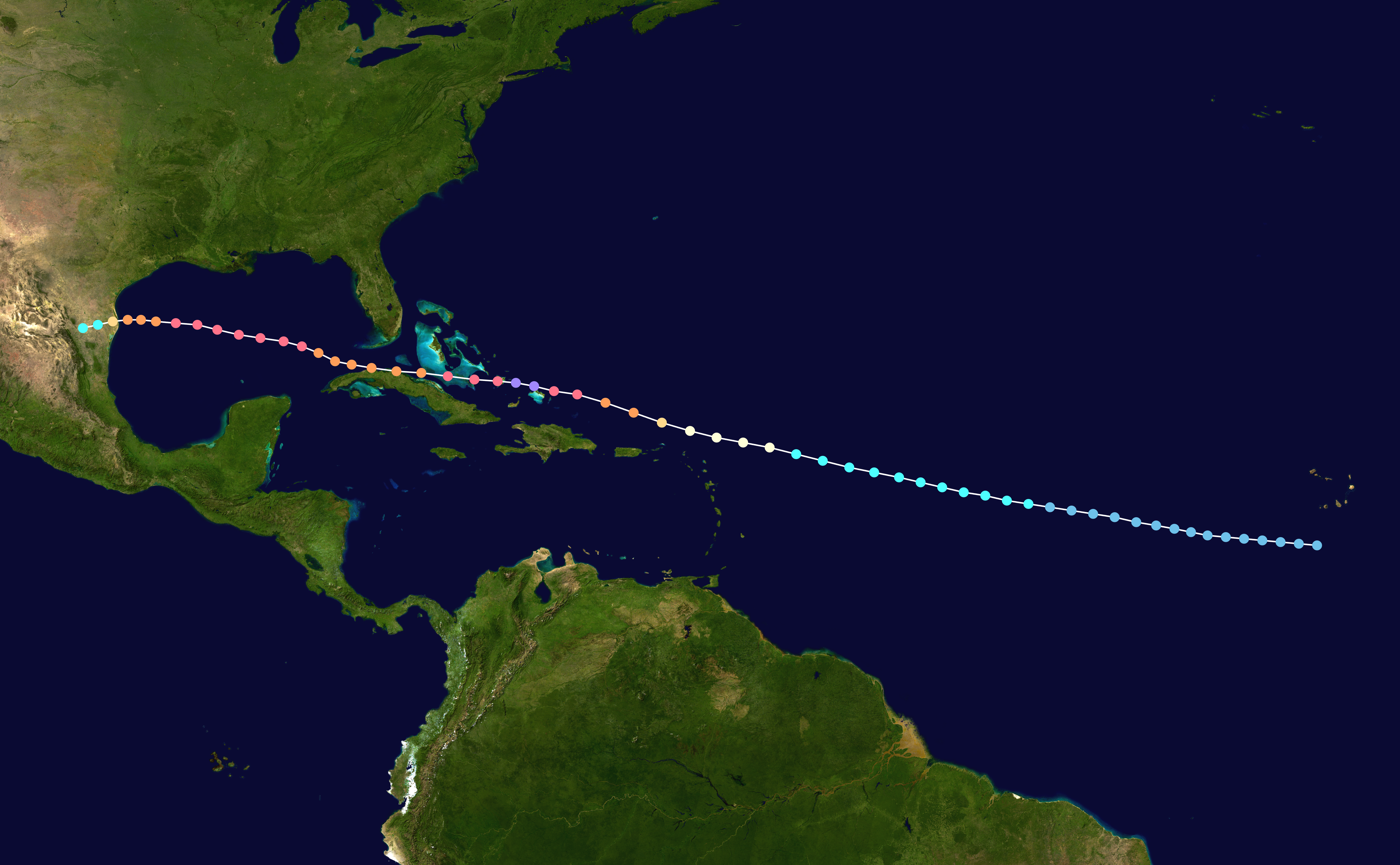
- Duration: August 22 – September 5
- Peak intensity: 160 mph (260 km/h) (1-min); <930 mbar (hPa)

The eighth storm of the season was one of two storms in the 1933 Atlantic hurricane season to reach the intensity of a Category 5 strength on the Saffir-Simpson Hurricane Scale. It formed on August 22 off the west coast of Africa, and for much of its duration it maintained a west-northwest track. The system intensified into a tropical storm on August 26 and into a hurricane on August 28. Passing north of the Lesser Antilles, the hurricane rapidly intensified as it approached the Turks and Caicos islands. It reached Category 5 status and its peak winds of 160 mph (260 km/h) on August 31. Subsequently, it weakened before striking northern Cuba on September 1 with winds of 120 mph (190 km/h). In the country, the hurricane left about 100,000 people homeless and killed over 70 people. Damage was heaviest near the storm's path, and the strong winds destroyed houses and left areas without power. Damage was estimated at $11 million. (Note: All damage totals are in 1933 United States dollars unless otherwise noted.)

After exiting from Cuba, the hurricane entered the Gulf of Mexico and restrengthened. On September 2, it re-attained winds of 140 mph (230 km/h). Initially the hurricane posed a threat to the area around Corpus Christi, Texas, and the local United States Weather Bureau forecaster advised people to stay away from the Texas coastline during the busy Labor Day Weekend. Officials declared martial law in the city and mandated evacuations. However, the hurricane turned more to the west and struck near Brownsville early on September 5 with winds estimated at 125 mph (201 km/h). It quickly dissipated after causing heavy damage in the Rio Grande Valley. High winds caused heavy damage to the citrus crop. The hurricane left $16.9 million in damage and 40 deaths in southern Texas.

=== Tropical Storm Nine ===
- Tropical storm (SSHWS)
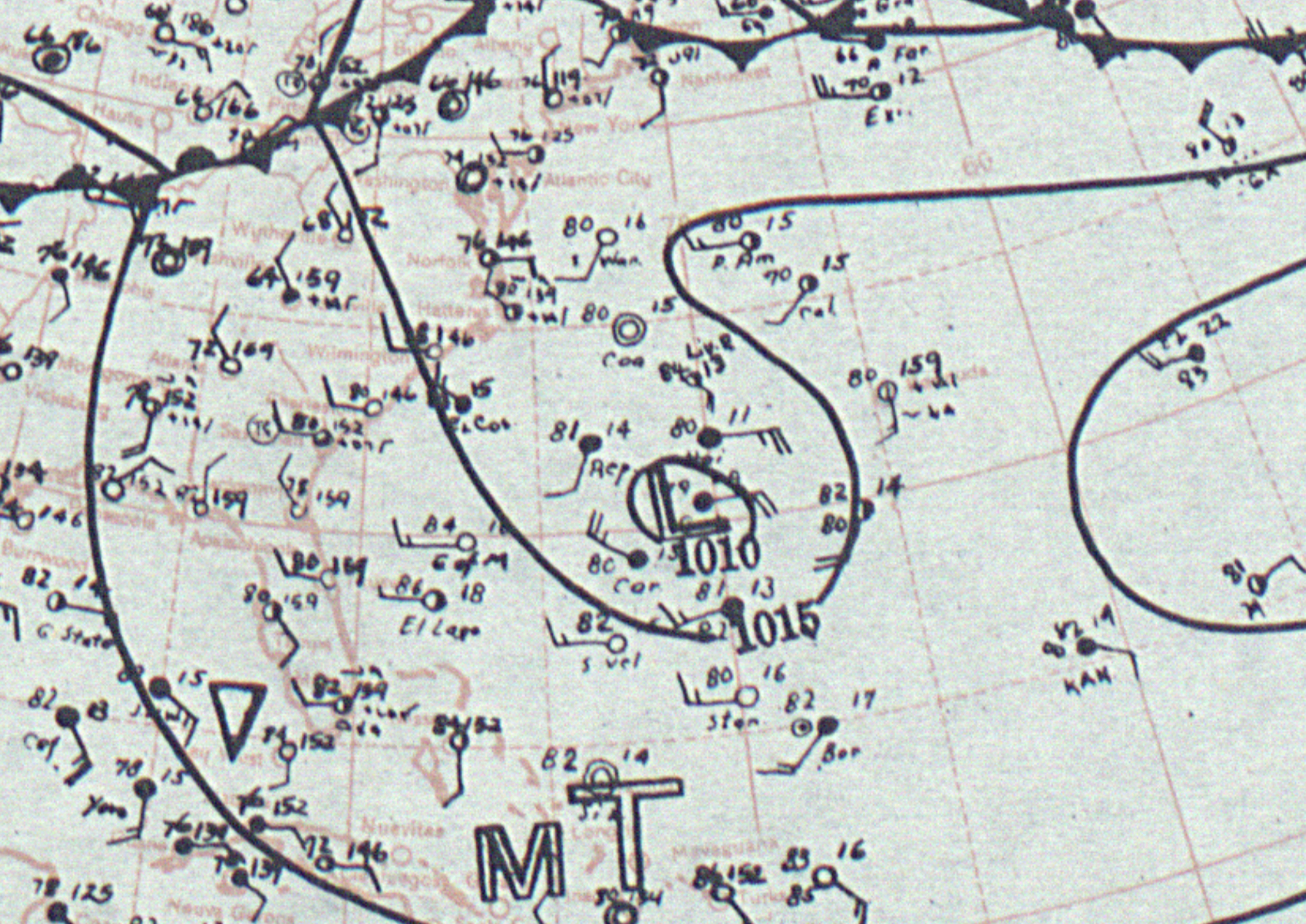
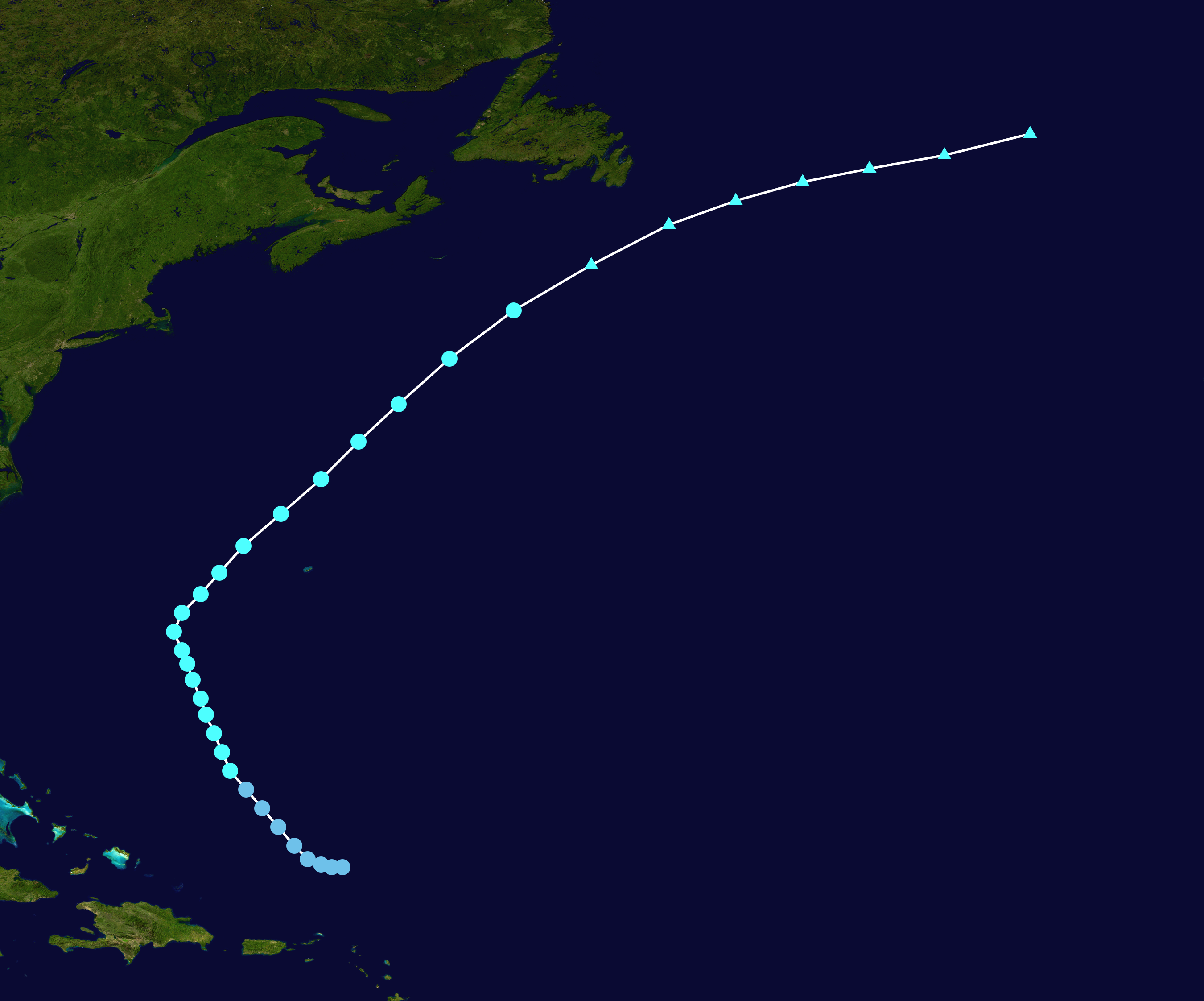
- Duration: August 23 – August 30
- Peak intensity: 50 mph (85 km/h) (1-min); 999 mbar (hPa)

On August 23, another tropical storm was observed north of Puerto Rico. It moved northwestward for three days, slowly strengthening as it moved over the open ocean. The storm turned to the northeast and reached peak sustained winds of 50 mph (80 km/h) a short distance to the west of Bermuda. It began weakening shortly thereafter, and on August 30 the storm became extratropical to the southeast of Newfoundland. It continued to the northeast and was last observed on August 31 over the north-central Atlantic Ocean. It did not cause significant effects on land.

=== Tropical Storm Ten ===
- Tropical storm (SSHWS)
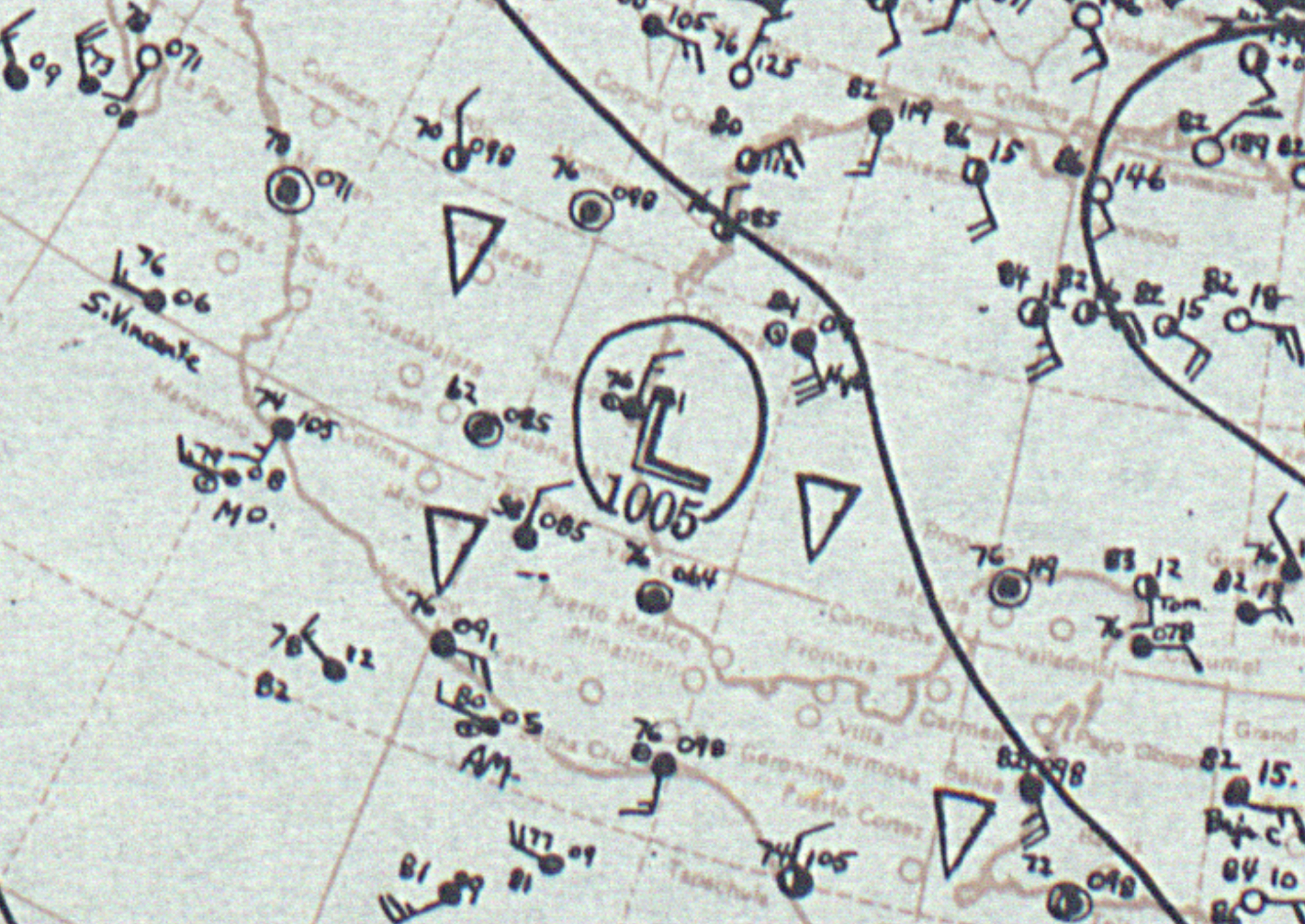
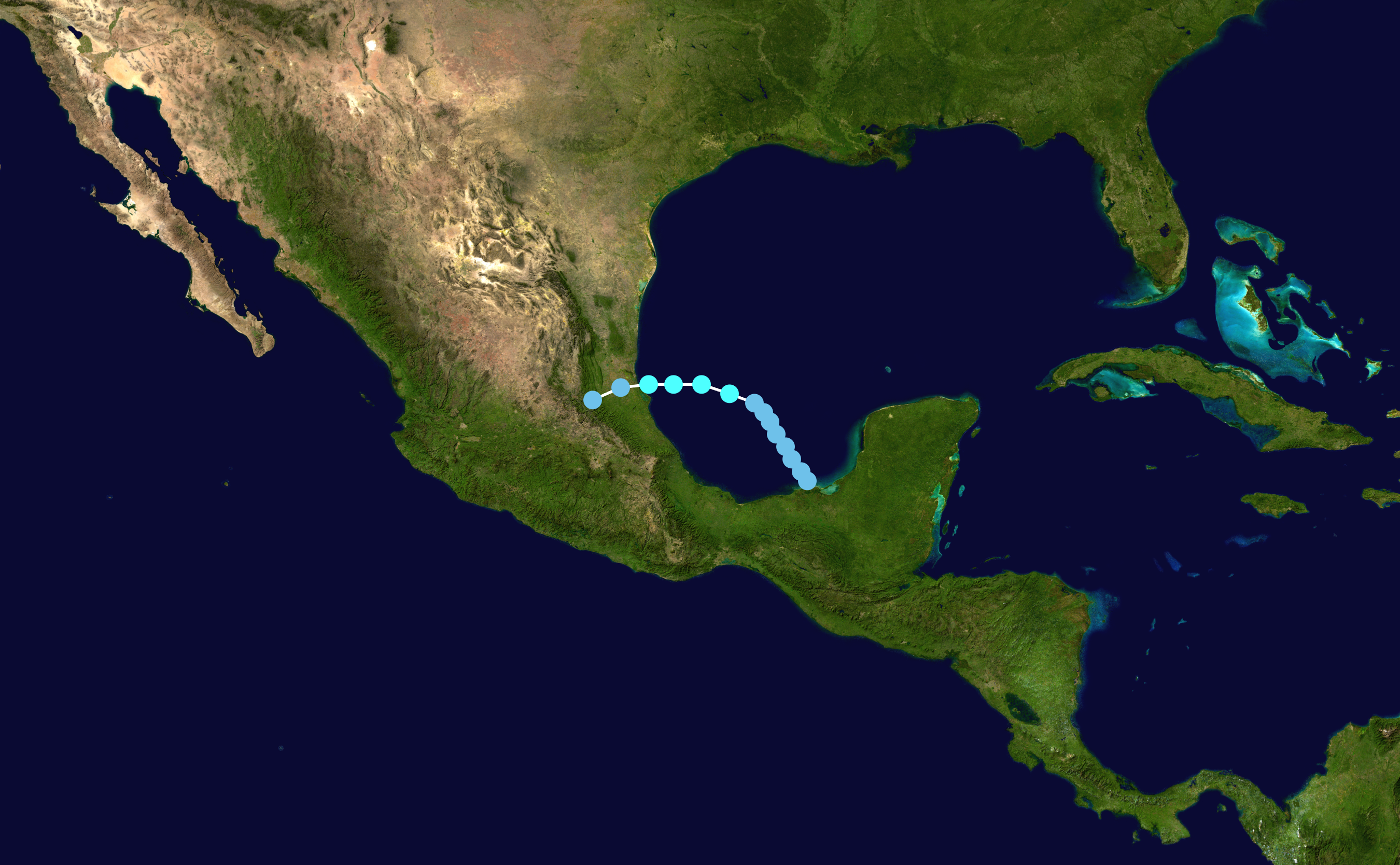
- Duration: August 26 – August 29
- Peak intensity: 40 mph (65 km/h) (1-min); 1002 mbar (hPa)

A tropical storm formed in the Bay of Campeche. It initially moved to the northwest. The cyclone remained a minimal tropical storm for most of its lifetime. On August 29, the storm turned to the west-southwest and made landfall near Tampico, Mexico, dissipating shortly thereafter. The tropical storm caused heavy rains near the coast, although winds were minor. Due to uncertainty as to its course, tropical storm warnings were issued for portions of the southern Texas coastline.

=== Hurricane Eleven ===
- Category 4 hurricane (SSHWS)
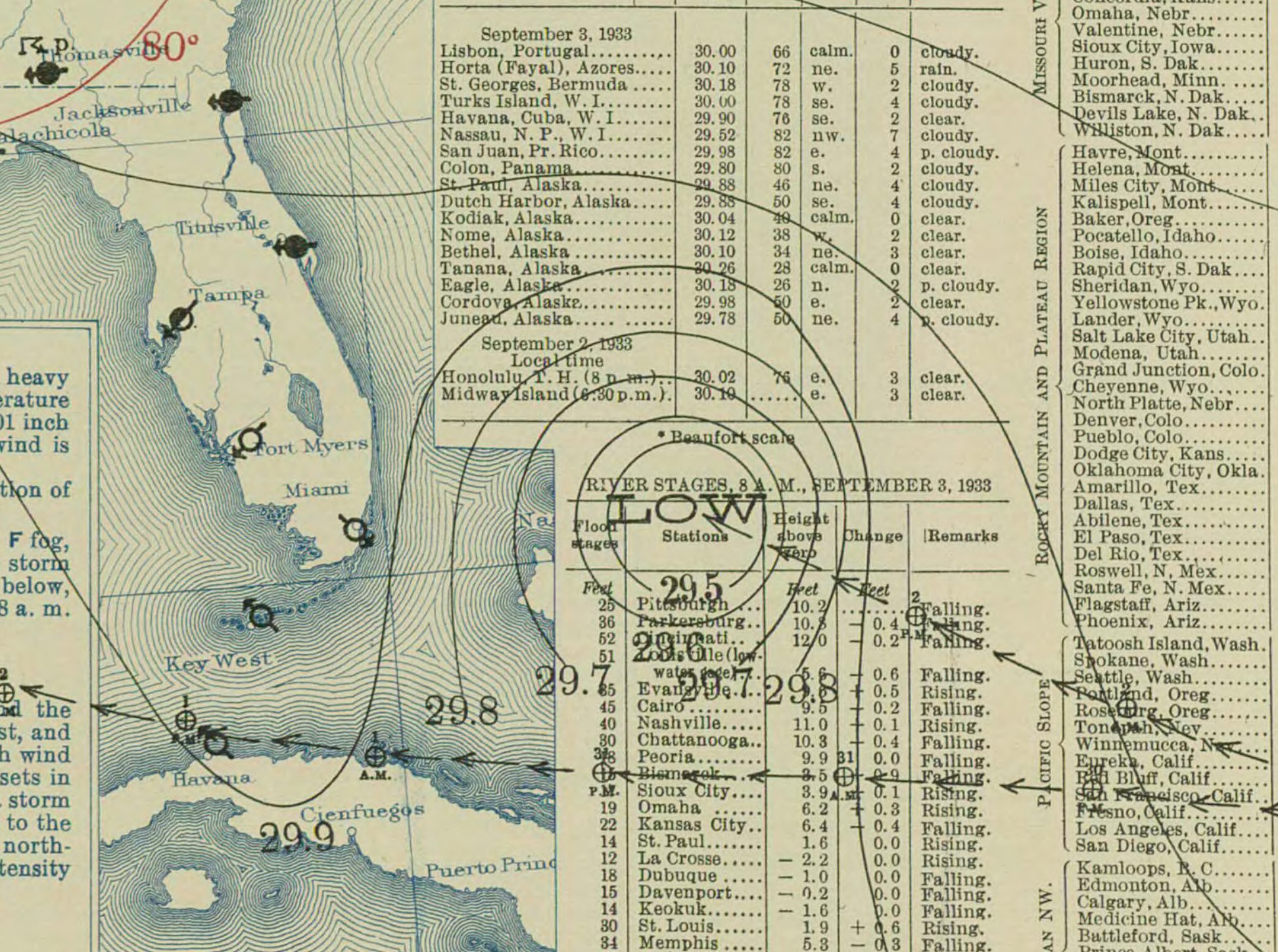
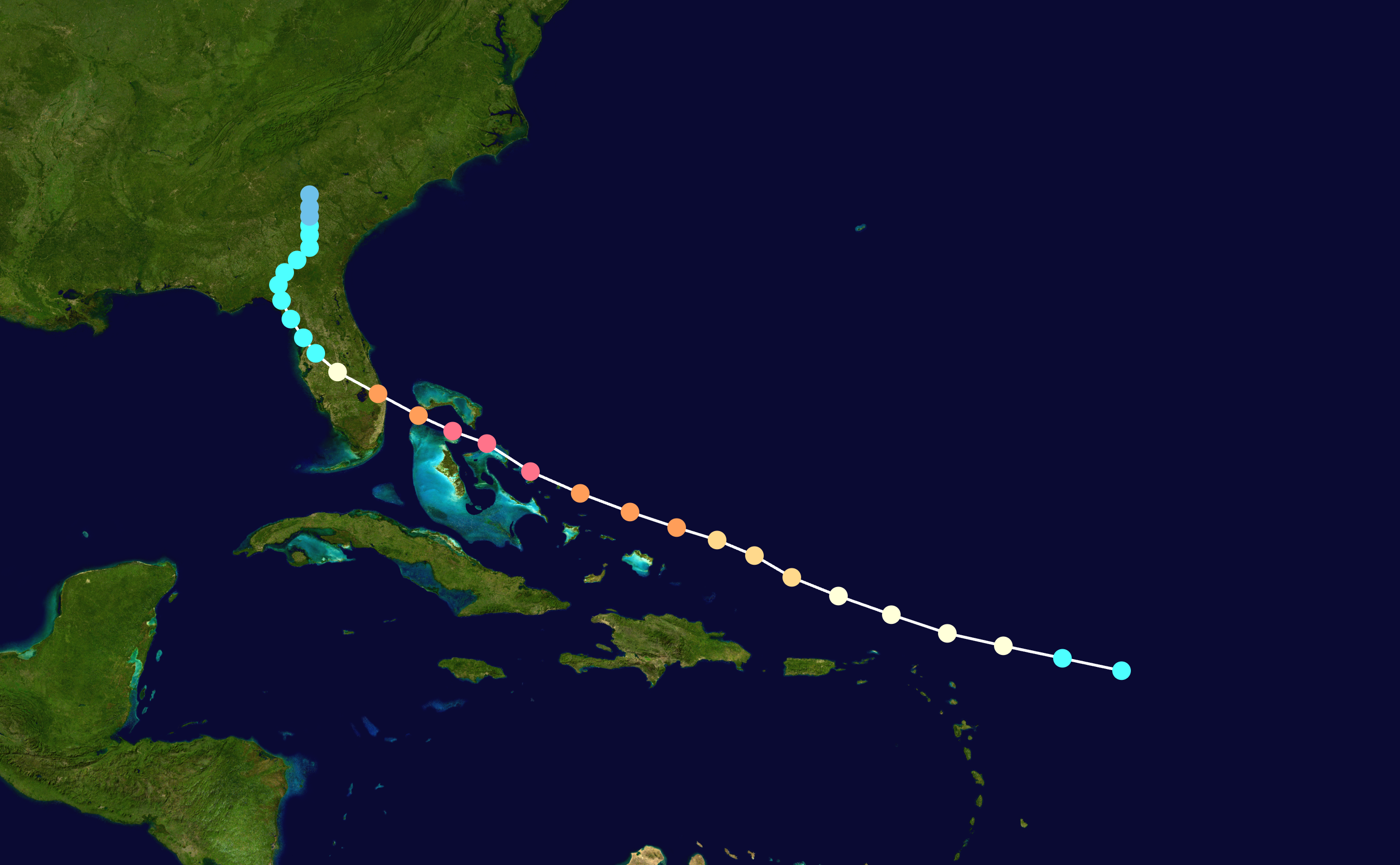
- Duration: August 31 – September 7
- Peak intensity: 140 mph (220 km/h) (1-min); 945 mbar (hPa)

A tropical storm was first observed on August 31, 225 miles (362 km) north-northeast of the island of Antigua. The storm rapidly intensified as it moved quickly to the west-northwest, attaining hurricane status later that day, and major hurricane strength on September 1, while located to the north of Puerto Rico. It continued west-northwestward and attained its peak intensity, with maximum sustained winds of 140 mph (230 km/h), on September 2. The hurricane, then at Category 4 on the Saffir-Simpson Hurricane Scale, moved through the northern Bahamas at peak intensity and weakened slightly before making landfall on Jupiter, Florida, with winds of 125 mph (201 km/h) on September 4. The system weakened rapidly over Florida to tropical storm status, and after turning to the north, decelerated. The weakening storm slowly moved through Georgia before dissipating near the Georgia/South Carolina border on September 7.

On Eleuthera Island, the Category 4 hurricane blew away the roofs of buildings, wrecked wharves, and lost boats. Hurricane warnings were issued for the eastern Florida coastline, and 3,000 people were evacuated around Lake Okeechobee to safer areas. In southeastern Florida, the strong winds broke many glass windows and downed trees and power lines; severe house damage was reported near the landfall location. The hurricane's powerful winds also severely damaged crops, including 4 million boxes of citrus fruit across the state. In total, Florida suffered $2 million in damage and two deaths.

=== Hurricane Twelve ===
- Category 4 hurricane (SSHWS)
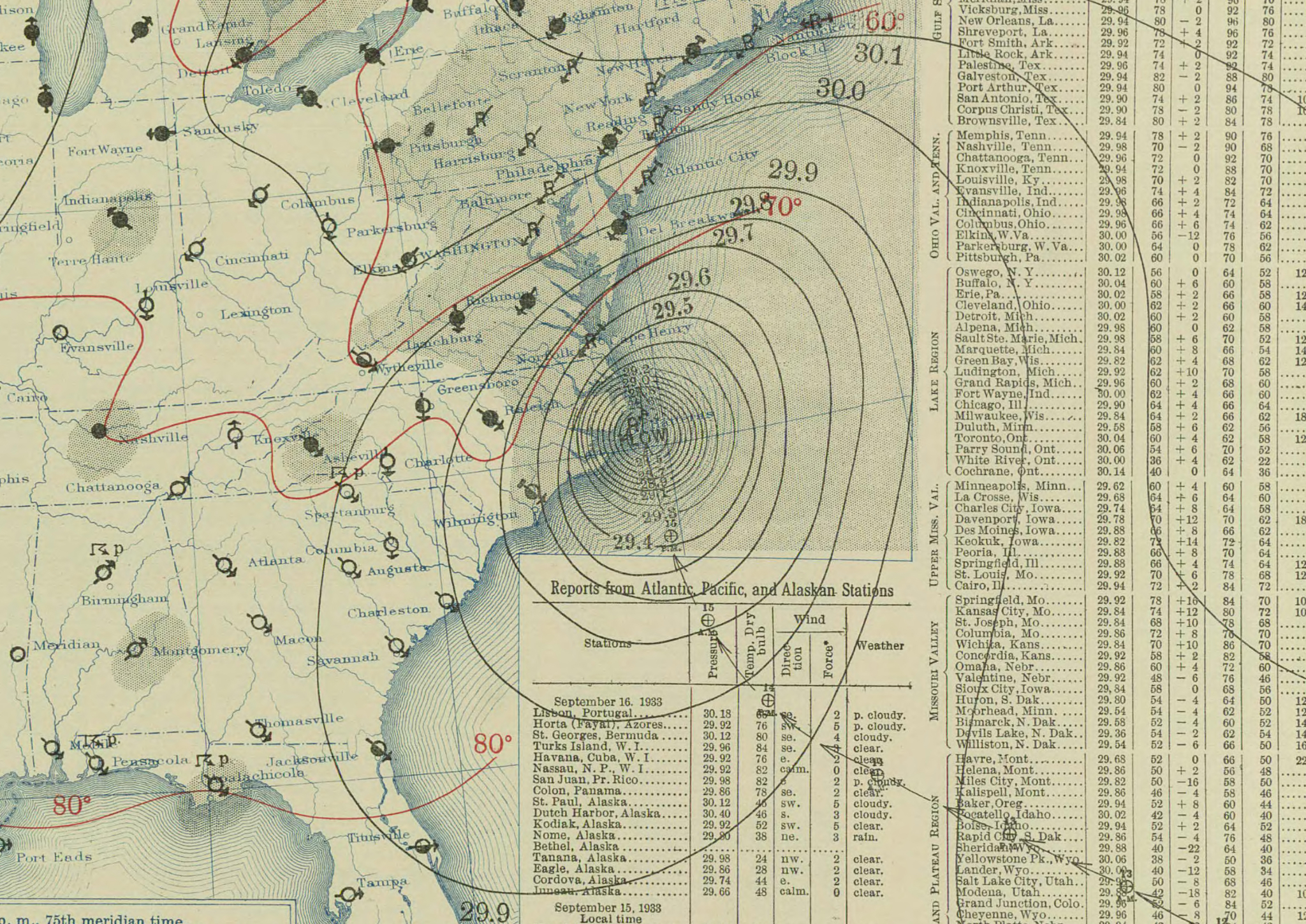
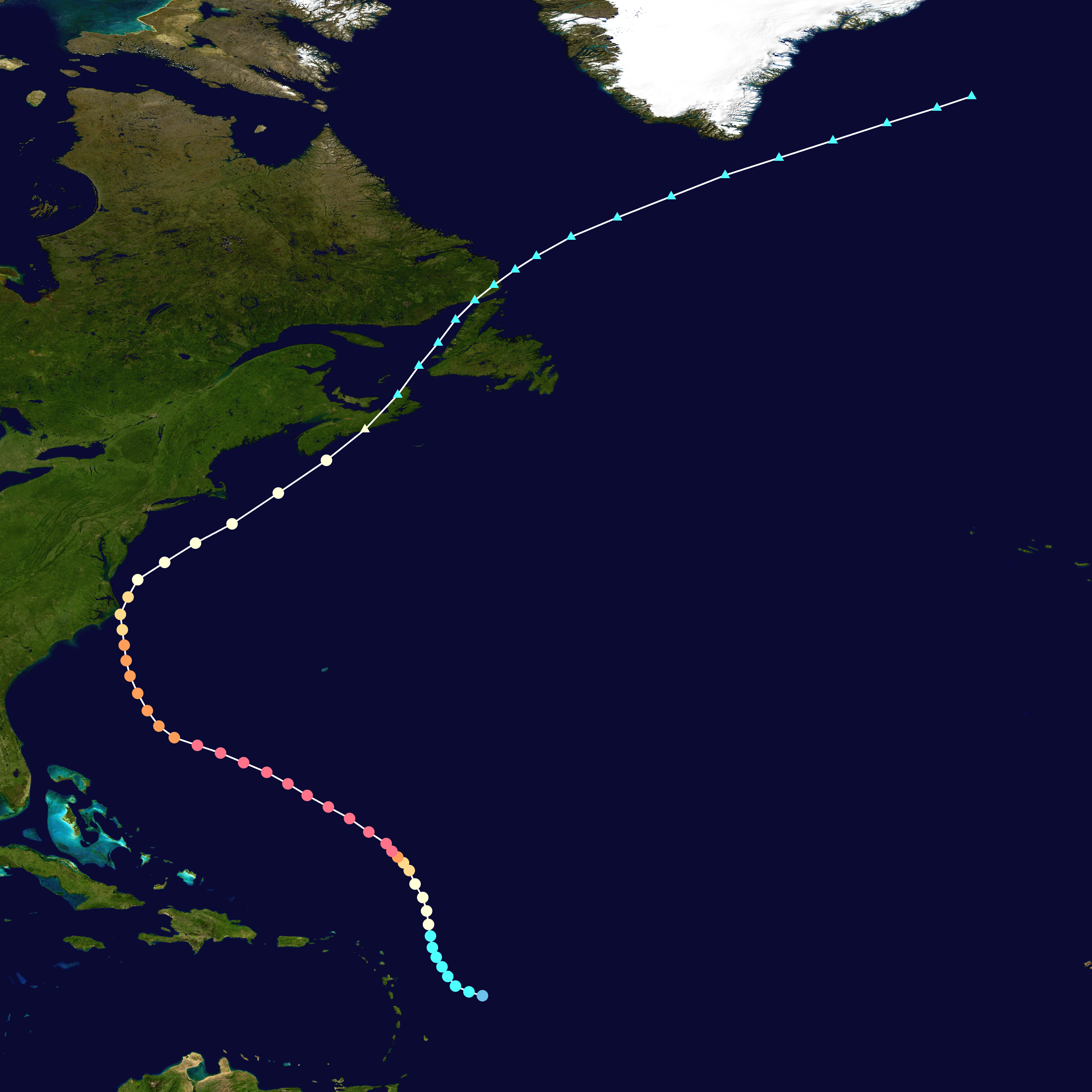
- Duration: September 8 – September 18
- Peak intensity: 140 mph (220 km/h) (1-min); <947 mbar (hPa)

On September 8, an area of disturbed weather to the east of the Lesser Antilles organized into a tropical storm. It moved north-northeastward, and after a turn to the northwest, the system intensified to hurricane strength on September 10. It steadily intensified and reached a peak strength of 140 mph (230 km/h) on September 15. It slowed as it turned to the north, striking southeastern North Carolina just west of Cape Hatteras as a Category 2 hurricane. After moving through the Outer Banks, the system accelerated to the northeast and became extratropical on September 18 about halfway between Cape Cod and the southern tip of Nova Scotia. The extratropical storm passed over Nova Scotia, Newfoundland, and Labrador before dissipating east of Greenland on September 22.

Strong winds from the hurricane downed trees and power lines in southeastern North Carolina, causing damage to many houses. The hurricane produced a storm surge that flooded coastal streets with 3 to 4 feet (0.91 to 1.22 m) of water. In all, the hurricane caused at least 21 deaths, primarily due to drowning in high waters. Damage totaled around $4.5 million.

=== Hurricane Thirteen ===
- Category 2 hurricane (SSHWS)
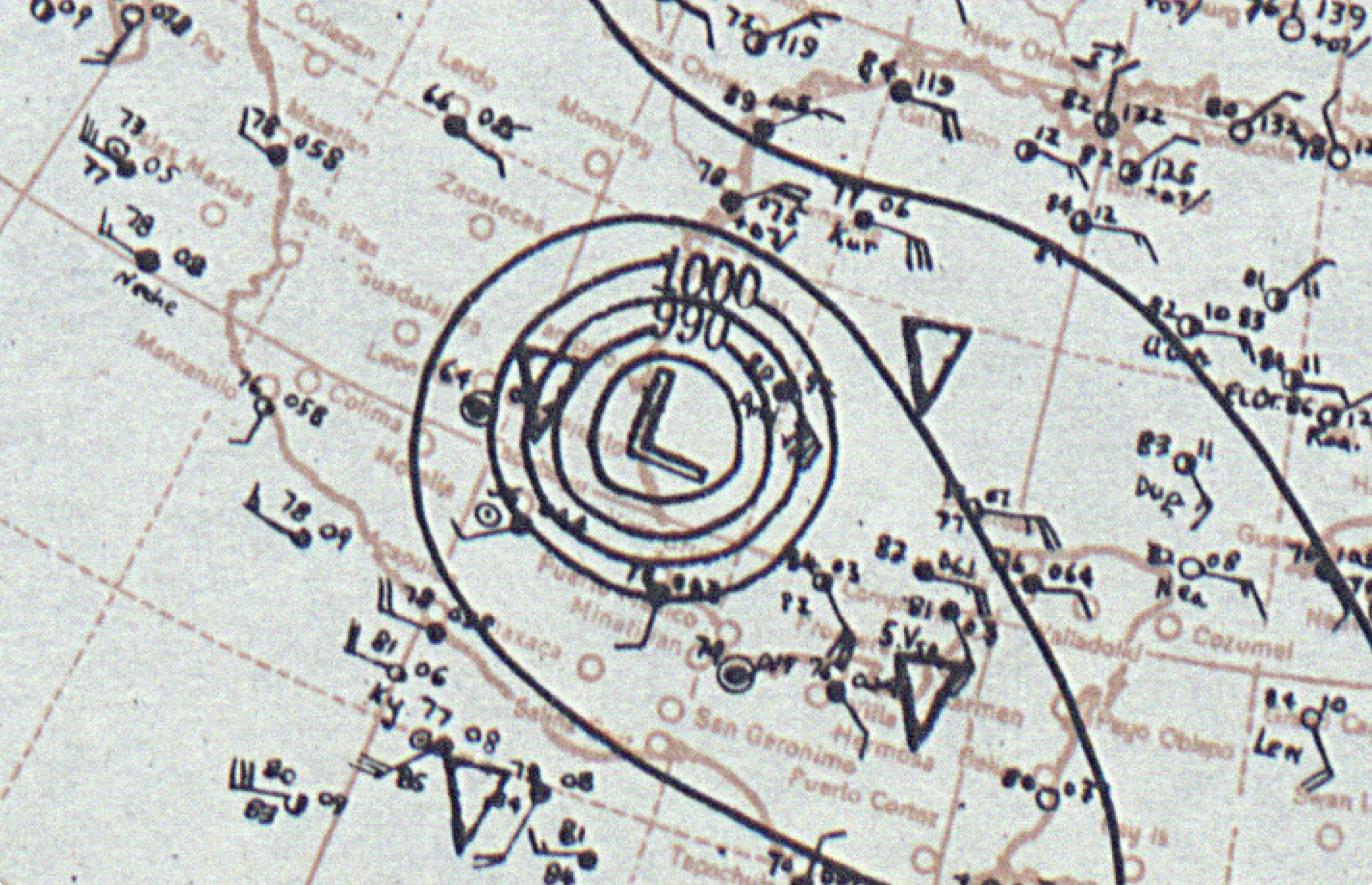
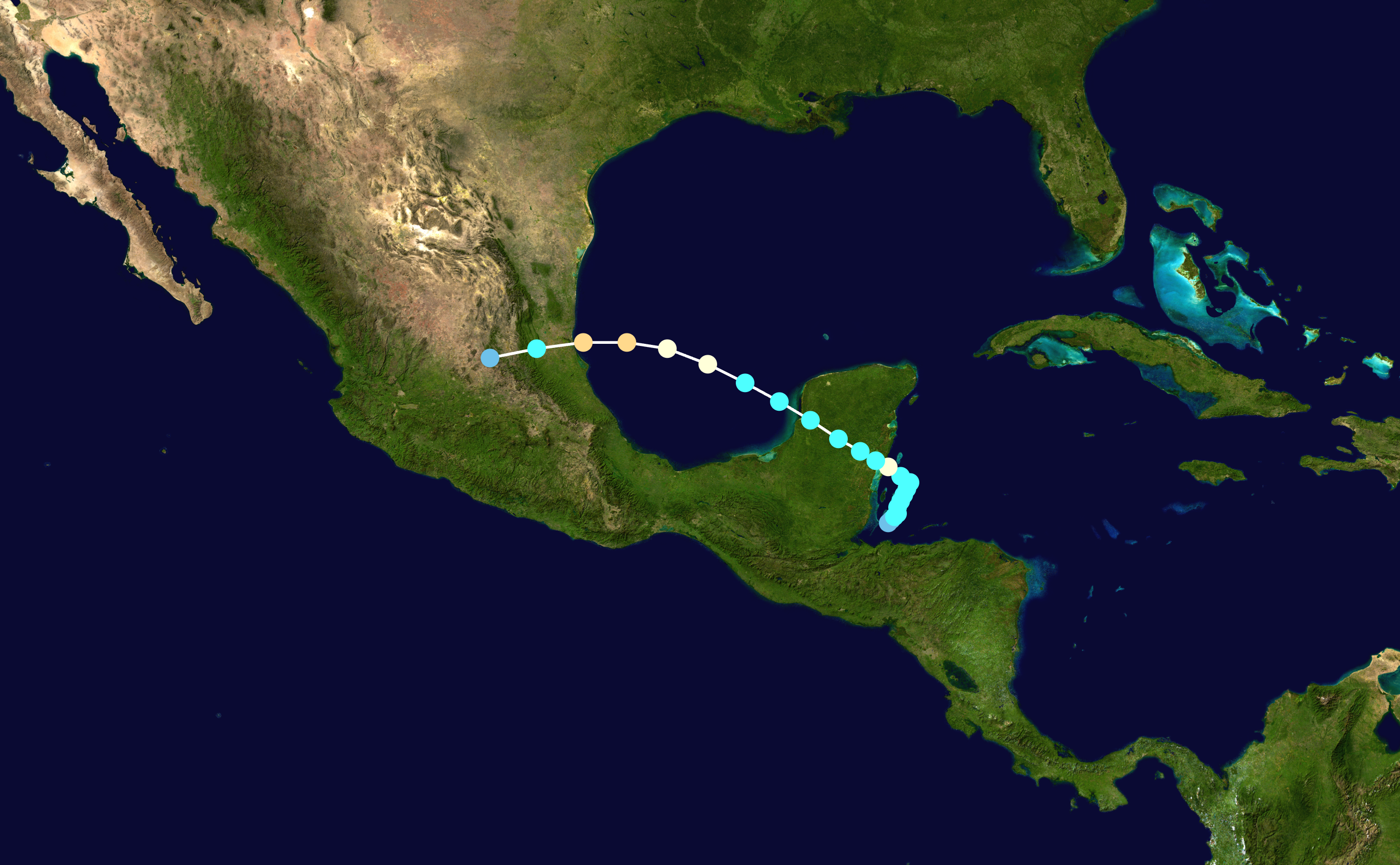
- Duration: September 10 – September 15
- Peak intensity: 110 mph (175 km/h) (1-min); 960 mbar (hPa)

On September 10, as Hurricane Twelve was intensifying over the waters of the Atlantic Ocean, another area of disturbed weather developed into a tropical storm over the western Caribbean Sea off the coast of Guatemala. It moved slowly northward and strengthened, becoming a hurricane on September 12 just east of Belize. On the next day, the hurricane made landfall on the Mexican state of Quintana Roo, and the system weakened to a tropical storm as it moved northwestward across the Yucatán Peninsula. On September 14 it again regained hurricane status over the Bay of Campeche. Attaining winds of 110 mph (180 km/h), the hurricane struck Tampico on September 15 and then dissipated.

The storm caused severe damage in Tampico and further inland, leaving several thousand homeless. Tuxpan, south of Tampico, also suffered heavy damage with many houses and office buildings destroyed. Total property losses were estimated at several million dollars. The hurricane caused a dam to collapse in San Luis Potosí, with the resulting floodwaters sweeping away four villages. Across Mexico, the hurricane killed 135 people.

=== Hurricane Fourteen ===
- Category 5 hurricane (SSHWS)
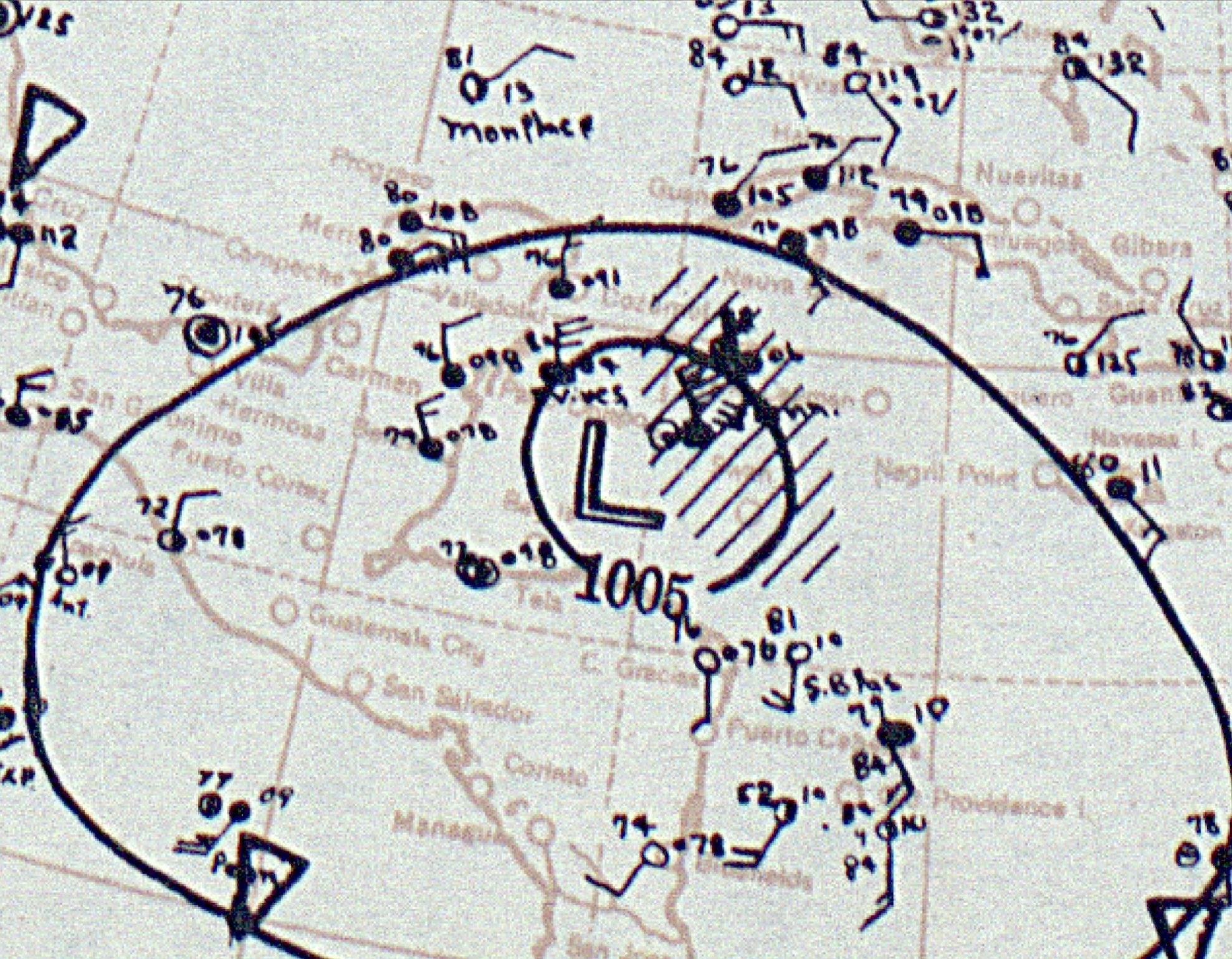
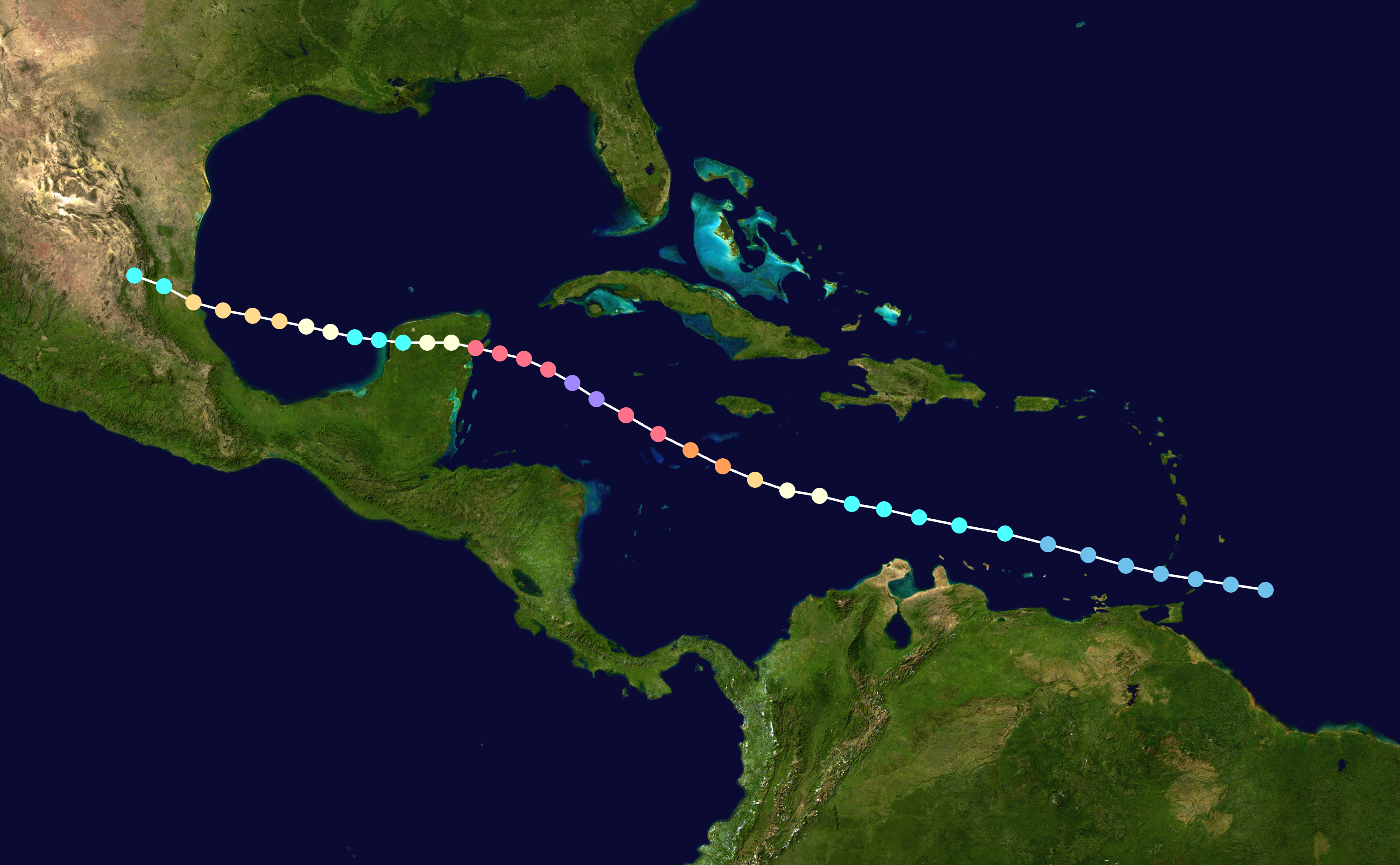
- Duration: September 16 – September 25
- Peak intensity: 160 mph (260 km/h) (1-min); 929 mbar (hPa)

On the other side of the Caribbean Sea, what would become the second Category 5 hurricane of the season, and the 14th tropical storm of the year, was first observed on September 16 to the east of the southern Leeward Islands. The cyclone, then a tropical depression, tracked to the west-northwest through the islands, slowly strengthening into a tropical storm on September 18. It attained hurricane strength on September 19 near Jamaica, then began a period of rapid intensification south of that island. On September 21, a ship measured a central pressure of 929 millibars (27 inHg), indicating that the hurricane had intensified to a peak of 160 mph (260 km/h). Continuing west-northwestward, the hurricane weakened somewhat and made landfall 40 miles (64 km) south of Cozumel Island on September 22. Winds at landfall were estimated to have been 140 mph (230 km/h), equivalent to a Category 4 hurricane by modern classification. The hurricane weakened slightly over the Yucatán Peninsula, but then re-strengthened over the Gulf of Mexico to reach a second peak intensity of 110 mph (180 km/h) on September 24. Shortly thereafter, the storm made landfall near Tampico. It dissipated on September 25 over Mexico.

Near Jamaica, the hurricane caused rough seas, although damage, if any, is unknown. While moving across the Yucatán Peninsula, the storm produced heavy rainfall and strong winds. In Cozumel, the winds destroyed a 300-foot (91 m) pier and several buildings. Rough seas sunk several ships, and one person drowned. The rainfall caused several rivers to overflow, causing flooding and damage to roads and railroads in the state of Veracruz. Many people in low-lying areas around Tampico evacuated for the storm.

Reports indicate much of the city of Tampico was destroyed, and the total number of deaths and injuries amounted to over 5,000. Most of the deaths occurred from flood waters, which were 10 to 15 feet (3.0 to 4.6 m) deep and covered the entire city; many bodies were washed out to sea, and were never recovered. The flooding washed out roads and railroads, delaying relief efforts into the devastated area. Water and food supplies in and around Tampico were damaged or contaminated, resulting in a threat of famine or disease that further aggravated the situation. Torrential rains caused more flooding, and the powerful winds damaged or destroyed nearly every building in the city and left many homeless. The strong winds downed numerous power lines, leaving the entire city in blackout, and destroyed two large water towers. There were at least 10 cases of looting; all of the perpetrators were executed. Damage in and around Tampico totaled over $10 million, and the storm killed over 184 people.

The thousands of victims took refuge in churches, theatres, and public buildings. Immediately after the storm, the Mexican military placed the city under martial law. Military and federal authorities dispatched trains with food, water, and medicine, and planes bearing engineers and doctors. Mexican president Abelardo L. Rodríguez rallied citizens to aid the affected people in the storm area. The local chamber of deputies allowed $140,000 in funds for the storm victims.

=== Hurricane Fifteen ===
- Category 1 hurricane (SSHWS)
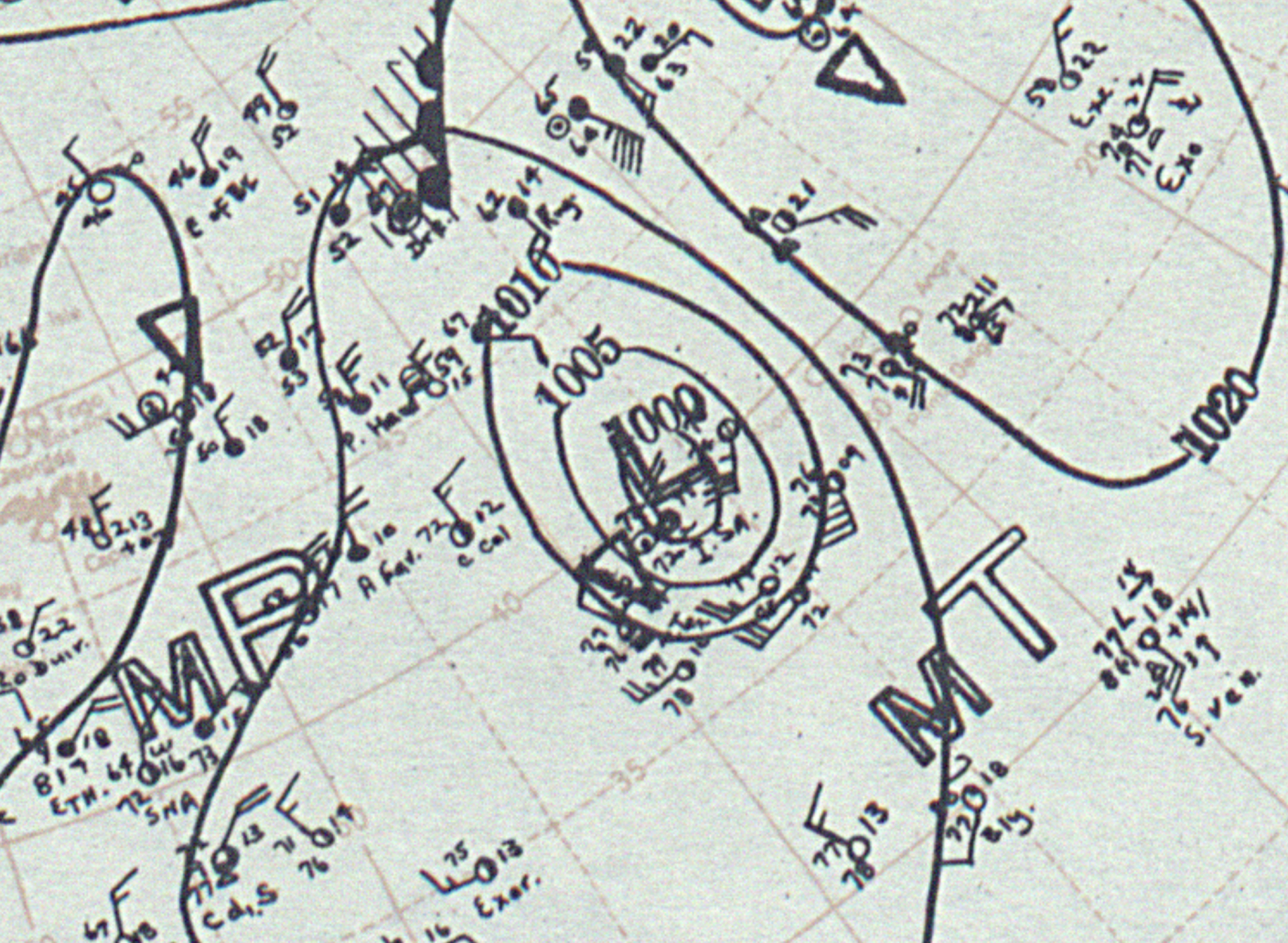
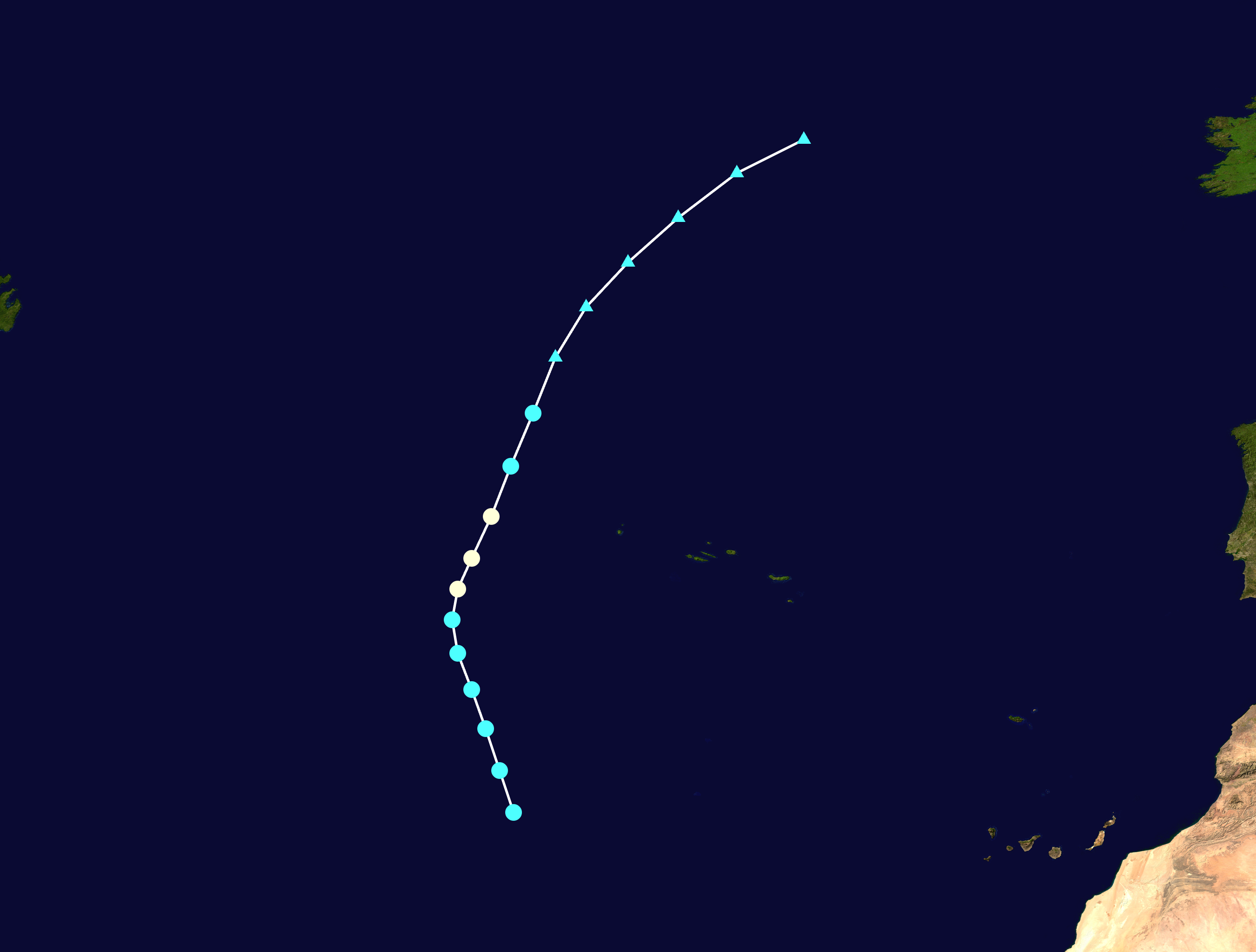
- Duration: September 24 – September 27
- Peak intensity: 75 mph (120 km/h) (1-min); 991 mbar (hPa)

A storm of extratropical origin developed into a small tropical storm on September 24 southwest of the Azores. Initially the storm moved north-northwestward, and based on ship reports, it is estimated the system intensified into a hurricane on September 26. It passed west of the Azores as it turned to the north-northeast, weakening to a tropical storm later that day. On September 27 the storm became extratropical, and the next day it dissipated.

=== Tropical Storm Sixteen ===
- Tropical storm (SSHWS)
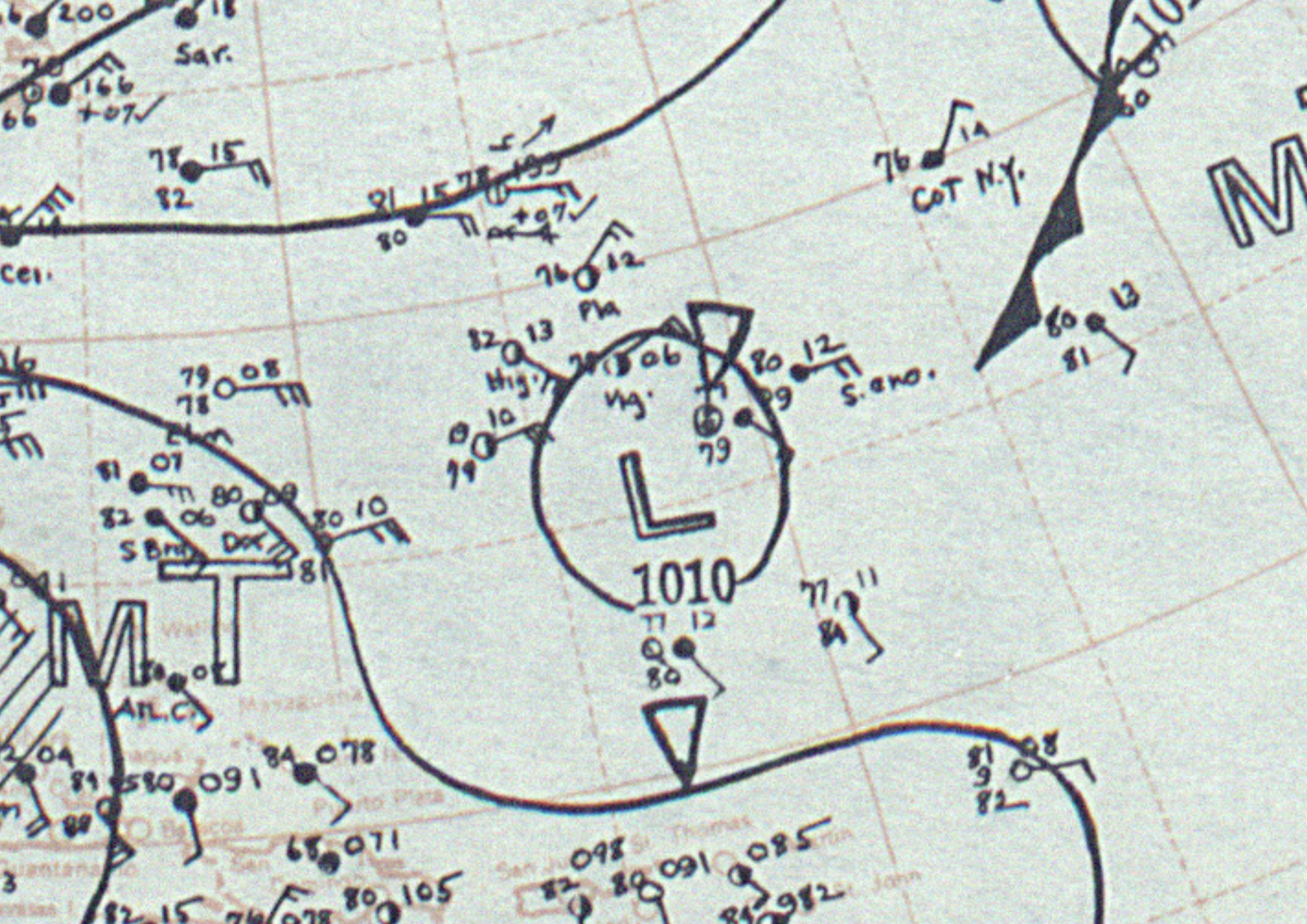
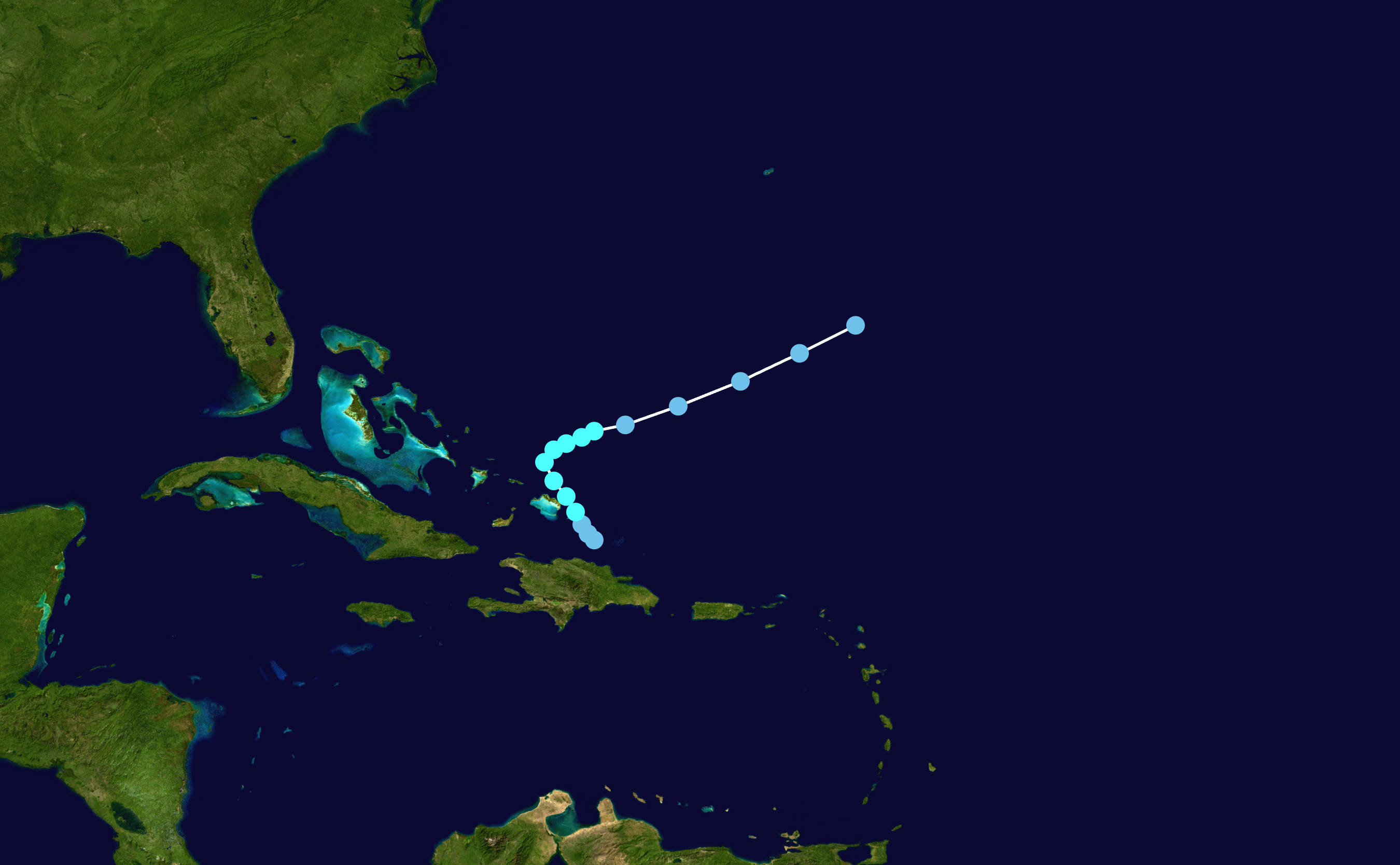
- Duration: October 1 – October 4
- Peak intensity: 45 mph (75 km/h) (1-min); 1012 mbar (hPa)

A tropical disturbance moved through the Lesser Antilles in late September. After crossing Hispaniola, a tropical depression developed on October 1 north of the Dominican Republic. It moved northwestward initially and quickly intensified into a tropical storm. It had a broad wind field, indicating characteristics of a subtropical cyclone. After reaching peak winds of 45 mph (72 km/h), the storm turned to the northeast and weakened. It dissipated on October 4 to the southeast of Bermuda.

=== Hurricane Seventeen ===
- Category 3 hurricane (SSHWS)
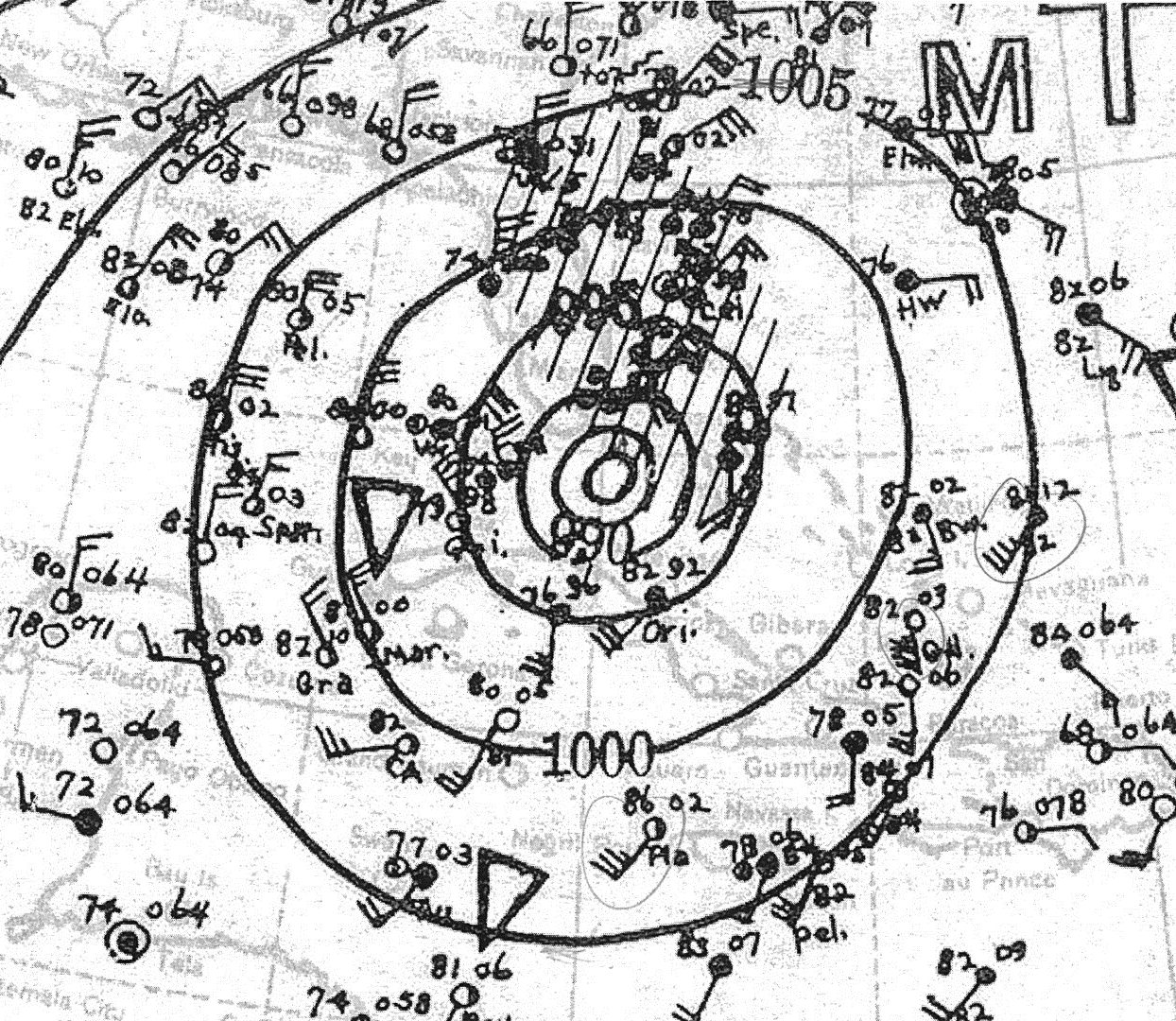
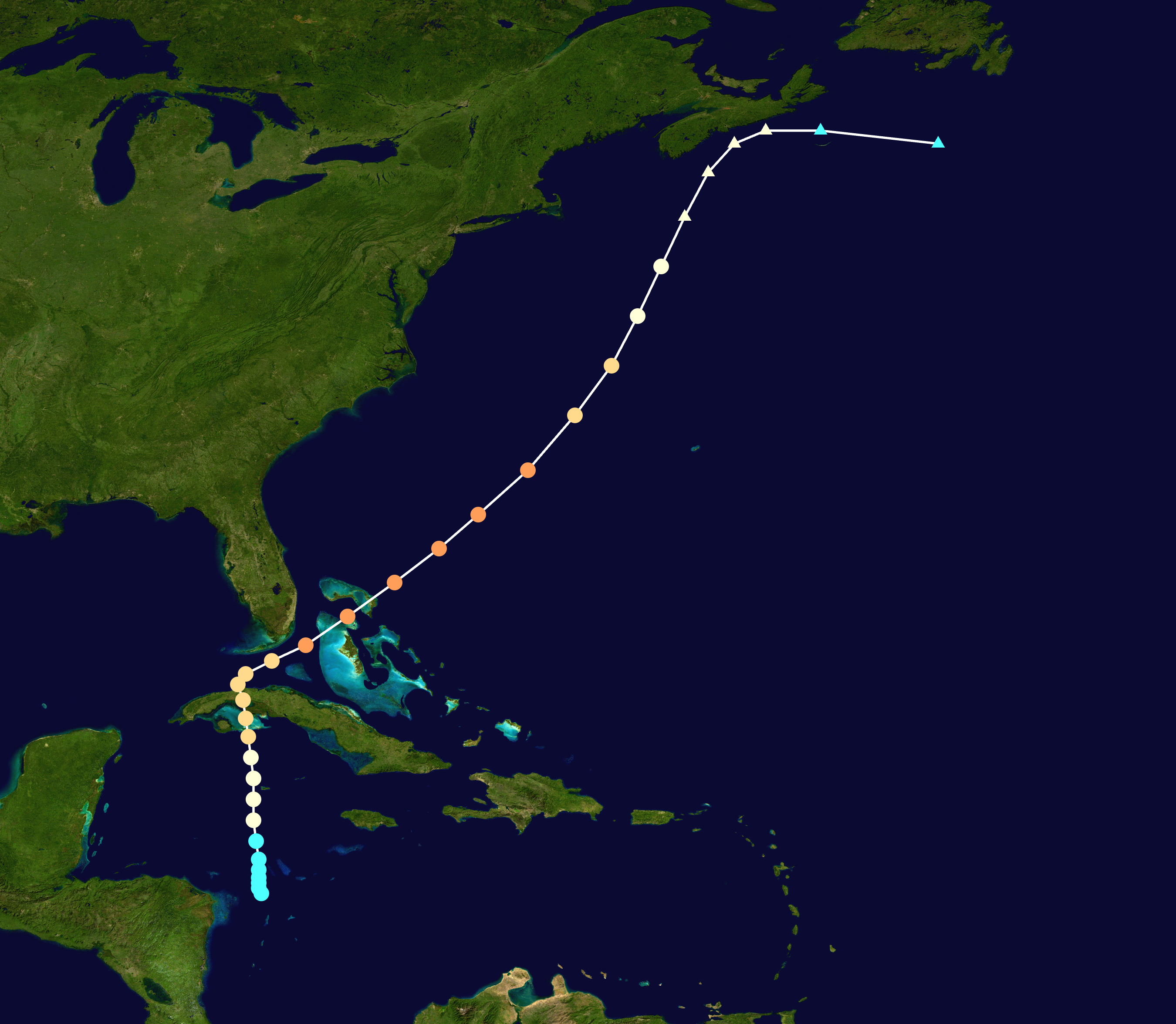
- Duration: October 1 – October 8
- Peak intensity: 125 mph (205 km/h) (1-min); 940 mbar (hPa)

On October 1, a tropical storm developed off the northeast coast of Nicaragua. It moved slowly northward and steadily intensified, becoming a hurricane on October 3 just west of Jamaica. The hurricane turned to the north-northwest and hit the Cuban province of La Habana with winds of 110 mph (180 km/h) on October 4. The hurricane passed over Havana and turned to the northeast and strengthened, becoming a major hurricane as it moved south of Miami, Florida. The hurricane reached a peak intensity of 125 mph (201 km/h) while passing through the Bahamas on October 6. The hurricane weakened as it accelerated to the northeast, and it became extratropical on October 8 to the south of Nova Scotia. It paralleled the Nova Scotia coast, turned to the east-southeast, and lost its tropical characteristics on October 9 over the open north Atlantic Ocean.

One person was killed in Jamaica due to flooding. In Cuba, people boarded up numerous buildings, and emergency workers assisted authorities in spreading the word about the impending storm; residents in vulnerable areas evacuated to shelters on higher ground. The hurricane's powerful winds destroyed several houses in Camagüey, and heavy rainfall overflowed numerous rivers in low-lying districts. The winds damaged and disrupted telephone and telegraph lines and injured a few people in Havana. Despite government orders for police to kill any looters, large-scale looting occurred in Havana after the storm. Two looters were shot to death, and a third was injured. Two civilians were also wounded by snipers who fired to disperse thieves. Residents in southeast Florida boarded up for the storm while the National Weather Bureau issued storm warnings for portions of the coastline. The hurricane produced strong winds and rain in the Florida Keys and extreme southern Florida, but damage was minimal. In northwest Miami, the hurricane spawned a tornado that damaged three houses and injured two. In Nova Scotia, the former hurricane left heavy damage to crops due to strong winds and heavy rain. Sunken boats killed nine people, and damage was estimated at $1 million (1933 CAD), including $250,000 in lost apple crop. (Note: $1 million in 1933 Canadian dollars (CAD) would be $20.5 million in 2013 CAD, adjusted for inflation figures from the Bank of Canada. When converted to USD, the total would be $20.1 million as provided by the Oanda Corporation, which would be about $1.1 million when adjusted for inflation to 1933.)

=== Hurricane Eighteen ===
- Category 1 hurricane (SSHWS)
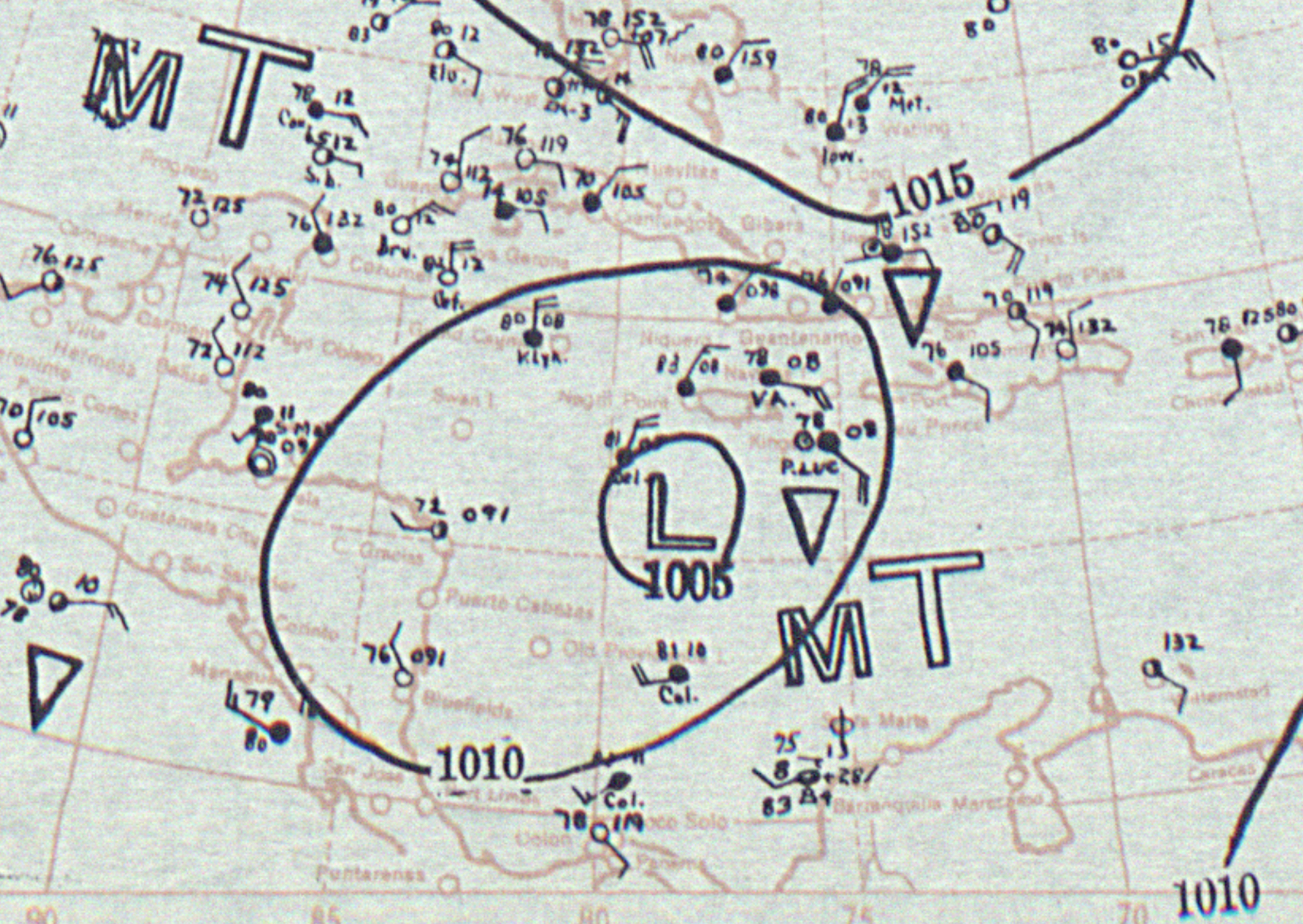
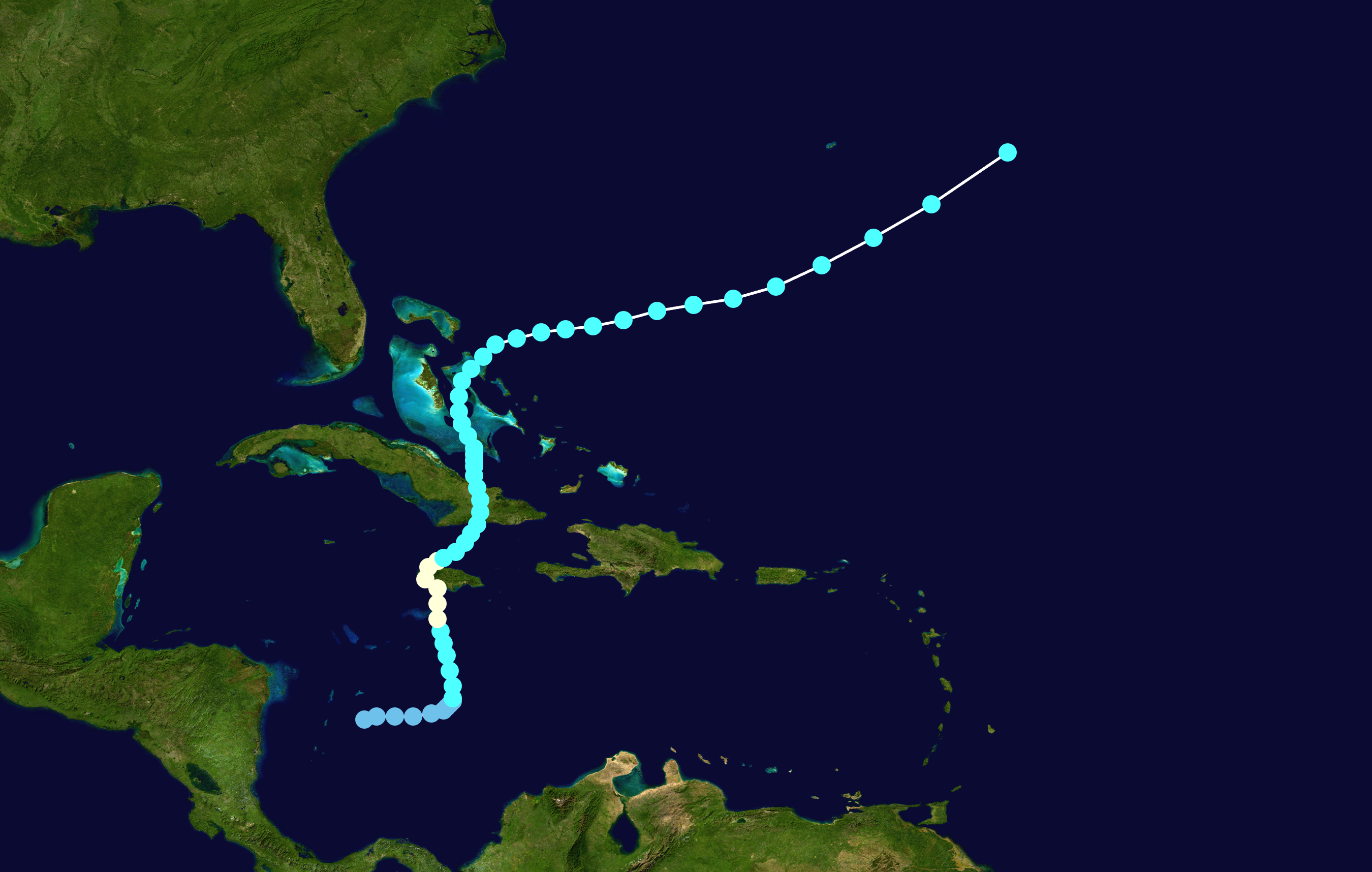
- Duration: October 25 – November 7
- Peak intensity: 90 mph (150 km/h) (1-min); 982 mbar (hPa)

After a two-week period of inactivity, a tropical depression was detected in the western Caribbean Sea on October 25. It moved to the east-northeast then curved to the northwest while slowly intensifying. On October 29, it strengthened into a hurricane near Jamaica and reached peak winds of 90 mph (140 km/h) before striking the western portion of the island. The hurricane turned to the northeast and weakened. It made landfall on southeastern Cuba as a strong tropical storm on October 31. The weakening storm changed its course to the north-northwest, as it drifted through Cuba and the Bahamas. On November 4, the storm turned once more to the northeast, accelerated, and was absorbed by an approaching cold front on November 7 near Bermuda.

While moving near western Jamaica, the hurricane produced strong winds of about 80 mph (130 km/h), which wrecked about 90% of the banana crop. One plantation lost 500 banana trees, and there was also damage to corn, coffee, and yams. Many houses were wrecked or washed away, leaving hundreds homeless. The storm cut power and telegraph lines and blocked roads, limiting communication. Rail lines were cut, and small bridges were washed away. Damage was estimated at $3 million, and there were 23 deaths. The storm also produced strong winds and rainfall in Cuba.

=== Tropical Storm Nineteen ===
- Tropical storm (SSHWS)
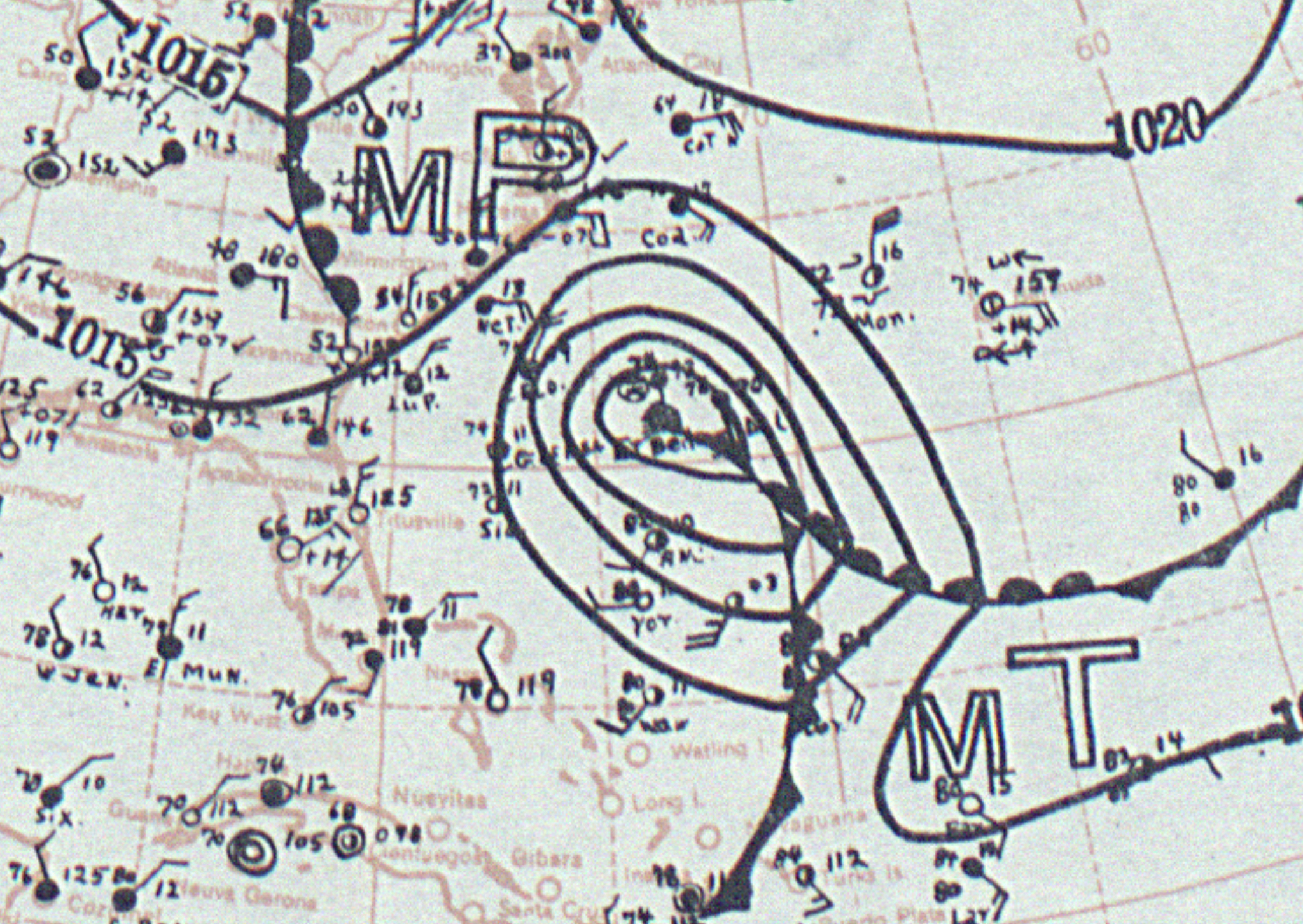
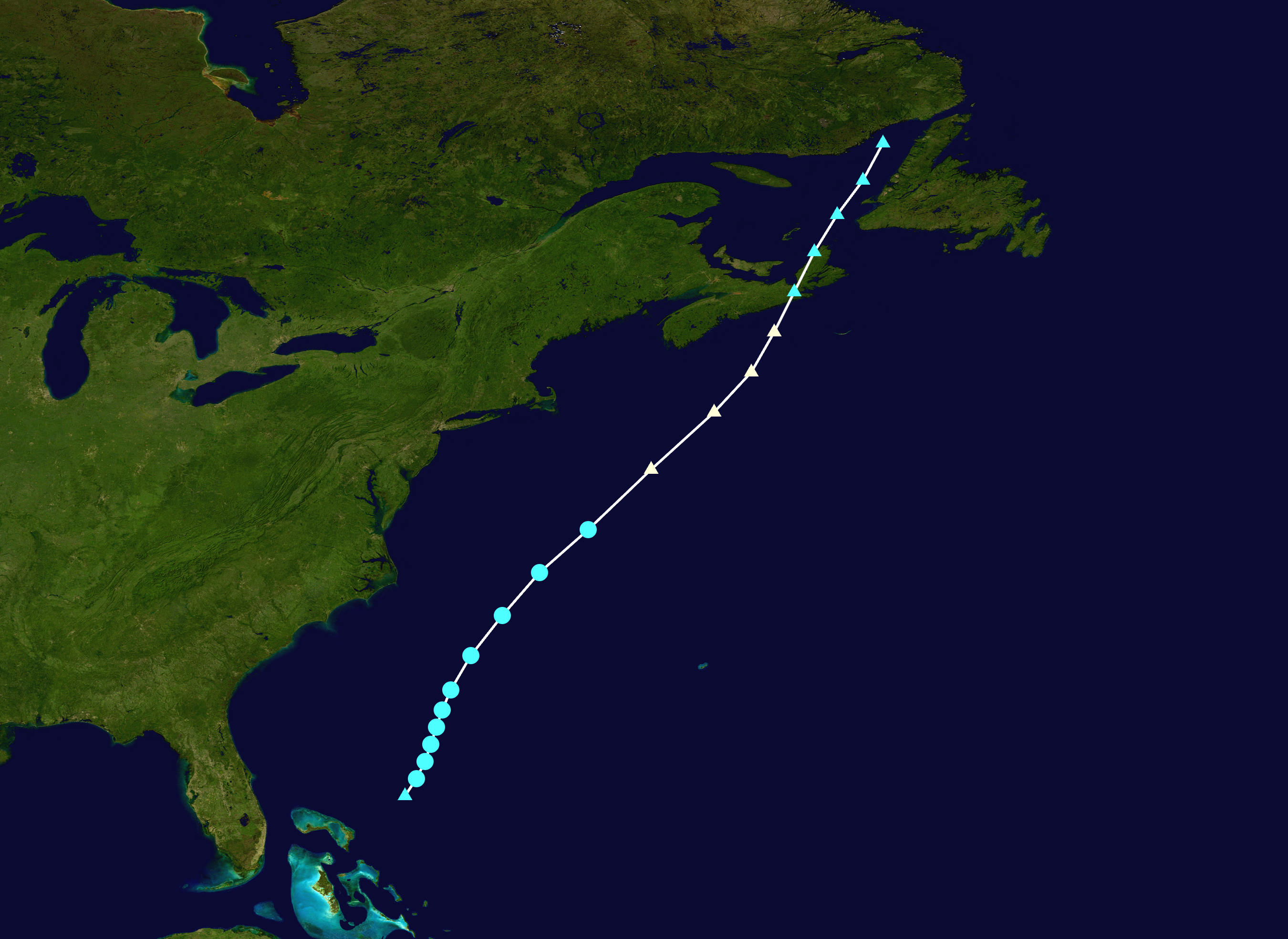
- Duration: October 26 – October 29
- Peak intensity: 70 mph (110 km/h) (1-min); 990 mbar (hPa)

Almost simultaneous to Hurricane 18, a tropical storm developed a short distance east of the central Bahamas on October 26. It moved north-northeastward, then northeastward, steadily strengthening along its path. On October 27, a barometric pressure of 993 mbar (29.32 inHg) was recorded within the storm, and on October 28 the storm reached a peak intensity of 70 mph (110 km/h). On October 29, the storm became extratropical and turned north to hit Nova Scotia. Wedged between two high pressure systems, it continued northward until dissipating over extreme eastern portions of Quebec on October 30.

In Atlantic Canada, the former tropical storm produced winds of 52 mph (84 km/h) in Nova Scotia, along with heavy rainfall of 2.3 in (58 mm) in Amherst. The storm sank one boat and washed another ashore. Winds were strong enough to knock down telephone and telegraph lines, mainly due to fallen trees which also covered roads and damaged houses. Flooding washed out several bridges and roads, covering one highway with 6 ft (1.8 m) of water, and entered the basements of houses. In New Brunswick, the storm damaged or destroyed 72 bridges. One man was struck by a car due to poor visibility from the storm.

=== Tropical Storm Twenty ===
- Tropical storm (SSHWS)
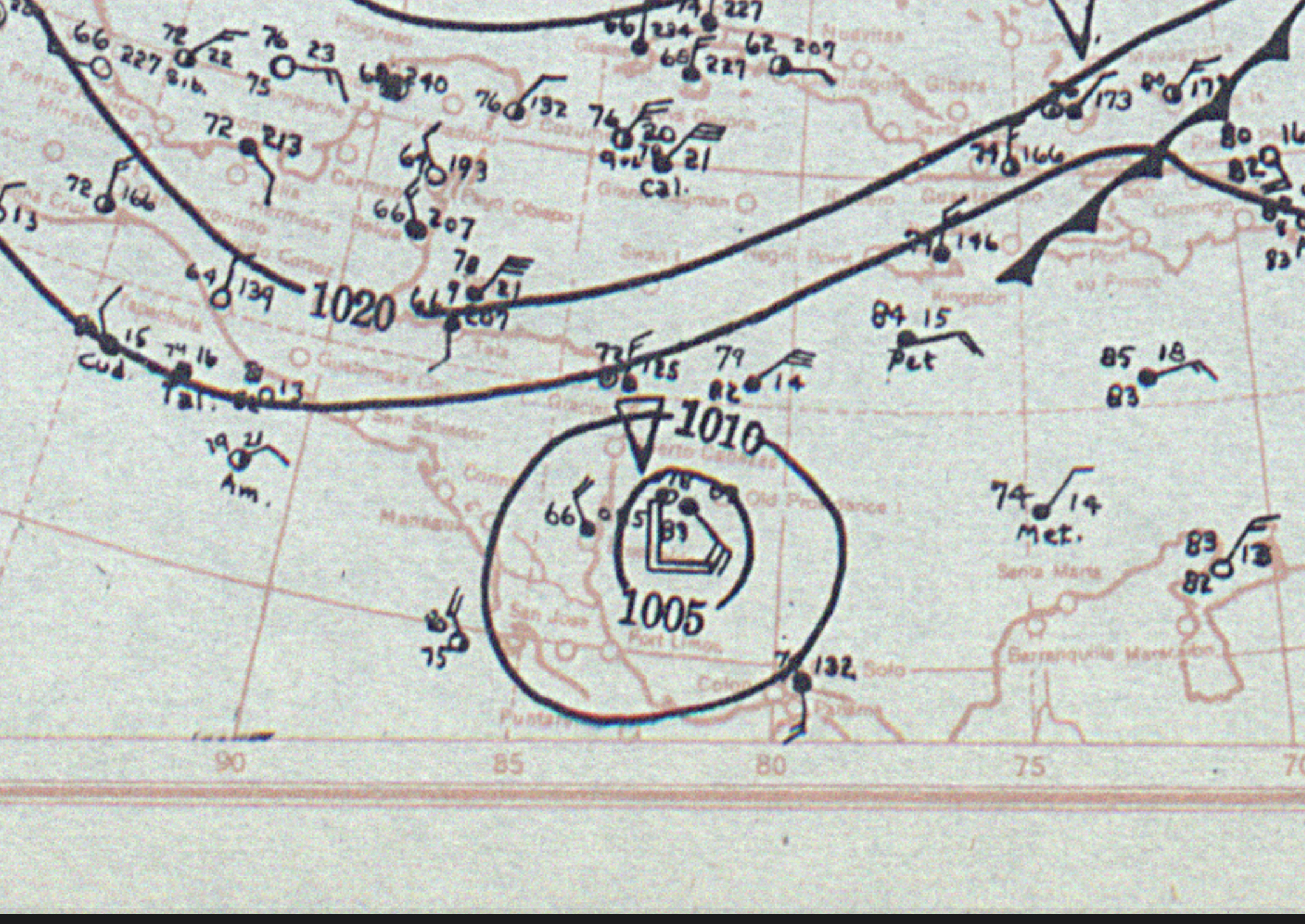
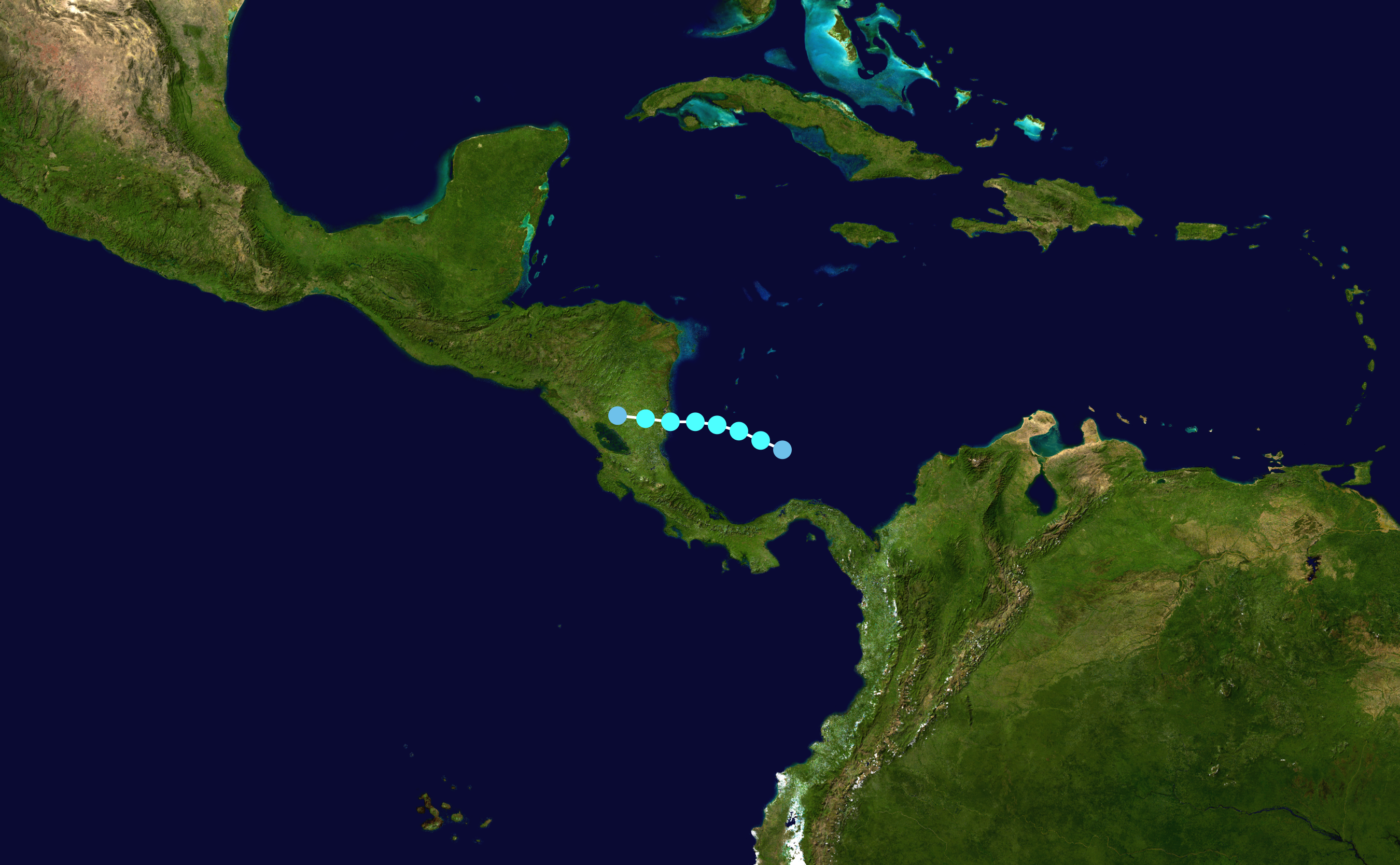
- Duration: November 15 – November 17
- Peak intensity: 60 mph (95 km/h) (1-min); 996 mbar (hPa)

After another calm period, the final tropical storm of the season was first observed on November 15 in the southwestern Caribbean Sea. It moved slowly westward, never strengthening beyond a minimal tropical storm in its short lifetime. On November 16, it struck the southeastern coast of Nicaragua, and it dissipated soon after on November 17.

== Seasonal effects ==
This is a table of the storms in 1933 and their landfall(s) in bold, if any. The minimum pressures, in most cases, are based on limited observations and may not have occurred at their peak intensity.

Saffir–Simpson scale
TD	TS	C1	C2	C3	C4	C5

1933 North Atlantic tropical cyclone season statistics
Storm name	Dates active	Storm category at peak intensity	Max 1-min wind mph (km/h)	Min. press. (mbar)	Areas affected	Damage (US$)	Deaths	Ref(s).
One	May 14–19	Tropical storm	50 (85)	1001	Central America, Mexico (**Tabasco**)	None	0	
Two	June 24–July 7	Category 2 hurricane	110 (175)	965	**Trinidad**, **Venezuela**, Jamaica, Cayman Islands, **Western Cuba**, **Tamaulipas**	$7.2 million	35	
Three	July 14–24	Tropical storm	50 (85)	999	Lesser Antilles, Jamaica, **Belize**, Yucatan Peninsula, **Texas**	$1.5 million	0	
Four	July 24–27	Tropical storm	60 (95)	1008	None	None	0	
Five	July 24–August 5	Category 1 hurricane	90 (150)	975	**Lesser Antilles**, **Bahamas, Florida, Texas**	$0.5 million	0	
Six	August 13–25	Category 4 hurricane	140 (220)	940	Bermuda, Eastern United States (**North Carolina**)	27	31	
Seven	August 14–21	Tropical storm	45 (75)	1007	Jamaica, Cayman Islands, **Cuba**	$2.5 million	83	
Eight	August 22–September 5	Category 5 hurricane	160 (260)	930	Turks and Caicos, **Cuba**, Florida Keys, **Texas**	$27.9 million	179	
Nine	August 23–30	Tropical storm	50 (85)	999	None	None	0	
Ten	August 26–30	Tropical storm	40 (65)	1002	**Tamaulipas**	None	0	
Eleven	August 31–September 7	Category 4 hurricane	140 (220)	945	Bahamas, **Florida**, Southeast United States	$2 million	2	
Twelve	September 8–18	Category 4 hurricane	140 (220)	947	**North Carolina**, Mid-Atlantic states, Northeastern United States, Atlantic Canada, Greenland	$4.5 million	21	
Thirteen	September 10–16	Category 2 hurricane	110 (175)	960	**Tamaulipas**	Unknown	67	
Fourteen	September 16–25	Category 5 hurricane	160 (260)	929	Cayman Islands, **Yucatan Peninsula, Tamaulipas**	$10 million	184	
Fifteen	September 24–27	Category 1 hurricane	75 (120)	991	None	None	0	
Sixteen	October 1–4	Tropical storm	45 (75)	1012	Bahamas	None	0	
Seventeen	October 1–7	Category 3 hurricane	125 (205)	940	**Nicaragua, Honduras, Jamaica, Cayman Islands, Cuba, Florida, Bahamas**	$1.1 million	10	
Eighteen	October 25–November 7	Category 1 hurricane	90 (150)	982	**Jamaica, Cuba**	$3 million	23	
Nineteen	October 26–28	Tropical storm	70 (110)	990	Atlantic Canada	Unknown	0	
Twenty	November 15–17	Tropical storm	60 (95)	996	**Nicaragua**	Unknown	0	
Season aggregates
20 systems	May 14–November 17		160 (260)	929		~$86.1 million	651	

== See also ==
- 1933 Pacific hurricane season
- 1933 Pacific typhoon season
- 1900–1950 South-West Indian Ocean cyclone seasons
- 1930s Australian region cyclone seasons
