= 1961 Atlantic hurricane season =

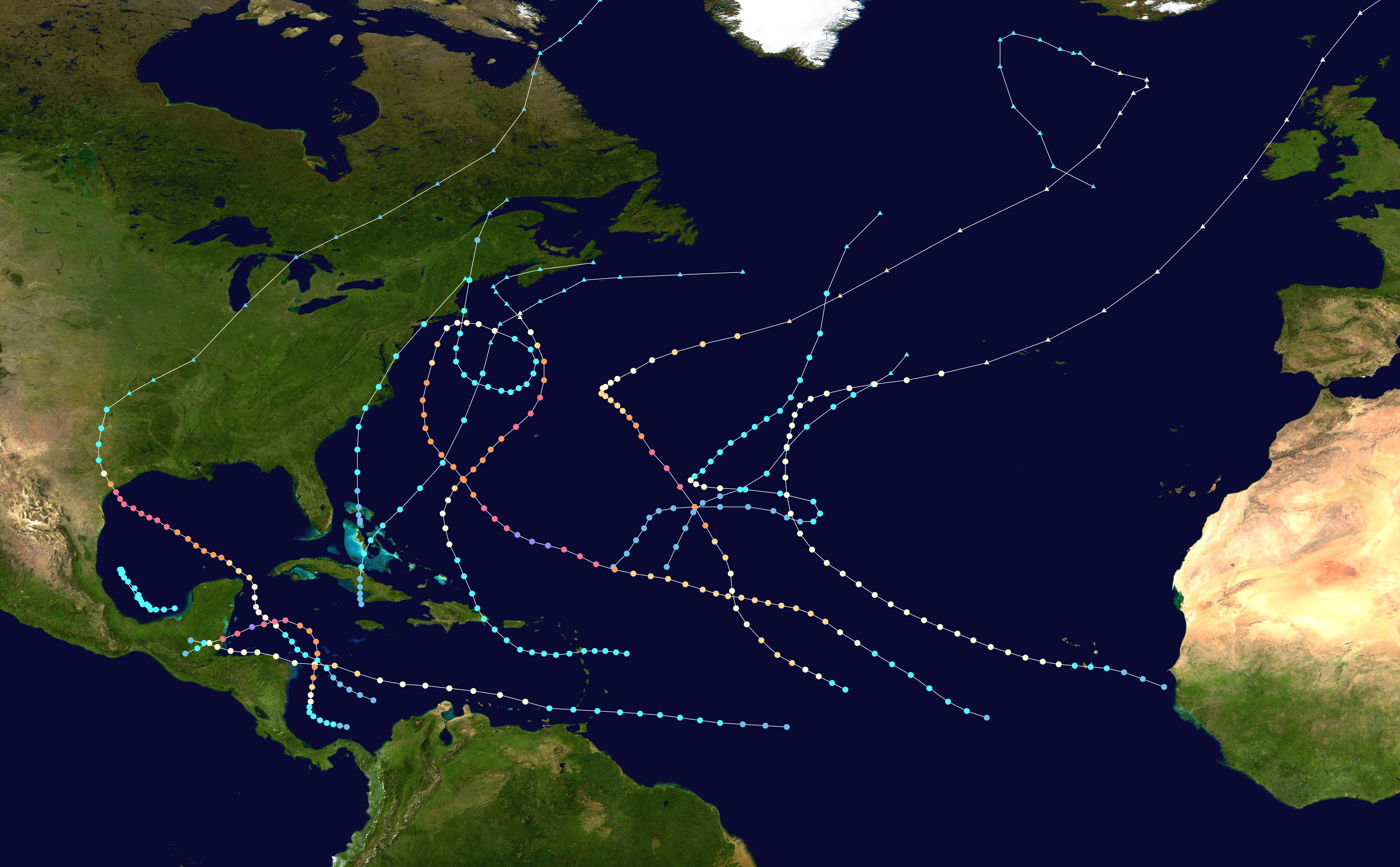
- Season summary map

Seasonal boundaries
- First system formed: June 10, 1961
- Last system dissipated: November 20, 1961

Strongest storm
- Name: Hattie
  - Maximum winds: 165 mph (270 km/h) (1-minute sustained)
  - Lowest pressure: 914 mbar (hPa; 26.99 inHg)

Seasonal statistics
- Total depressions: 14
- Total storms: 12
- Hurricanes: 8
- Major hurricanes (Cat. 3+): 5
- ACE: 189 (Ninth highest)
- Total fatalities: 437
- Total damage: $392.34 million (1961 USD)

Related articles
- 1961 Pacific hurricane season; 1961 Pacific typhoon season; 1961 North Indian Ocean cyclone season

The 1961 Atlantic hurricane season was a very active Atlantic hurricane season, with an accumulated cyclone energy (ACE) total of 189, the highest since 1950 and until being surpassed by 1995. The season, however, was an average one in terms of named storms. The season featured eight hurricanes and a well above average number of five major hurricanes. It was previously thought that the season had a record-tying seven major hurricanes, before the Atlantic hurricane reanalysis project downgraded two storms in 2019. Of the major hurricanes, two reached Category 5 strength. The season started on June 15, and ended on November 15. These dates conventionally delimit the period of each year when most tropical cyclones form in the Atlantic basin. The first system, an operationally unclassified tropical depression, formed offshore east Central Florida on June 10, but dissipated a few days later. Next, Hurricane Anna developed in the eastern Caribbean Sea near the Windward Islands on July 20. It brought minor damage to the islands in, as well as wind and flood impacts to Central America after striking Belize as a hurricane. (Note: Prior to its independence in 1981, Belize was known as British Honduras) Anna caused one death and about $300,000 (1961 USD) (Note: All damage figures are in 1961 United States dollar, unless otherwise noted) in damage. Activity went dormant for nearly a month and a half, until Hurricane Betsy developed on September 2. Betsy peaked as a Category 4 hurricane, but remained at sea and caused no impact.

One of the most significant storms of the season was Hurricane Carla, which peaked as a Category 4 hurricane, before striking Texas. Carla caused 43 deaths and approximately $325.74 million in damage. Hurricane Debbie was a Category 1 storm that existed in the eastern Atlantic Ocean. Early in its duration, unsettled weather from Debbie in Cape Verde resulted in a plane crash and the death of 60 people. The extratropical remnants of Debbie then brushed Ireland, causing severe damage over the British Isles. The next storm, Hurricane Esther, threatened to strike New England as a major hurricane, but rapidly weakened and made landfall in Massachusetts as only a tropical storm. Impact was generally minor, with about $6 million in damage and seven deaths, all of which from a United States Navy plane crash. An unnamed tropical storm and Hurricane Frances caused minimal impact on land. In mid-October, Tropical Storm Gerda brought flooding to Jamaica and eastern Cuba, resulting in twelve deaths.

Another significant storm was Hurricane Hattie, a late-season Category 5 hurricane that struck Belize. Hattie caused 319 confirmed fatalities and about $60.3 million in damage. Destruction was so severe in Belize that the government had to relocate inland to a new city, Belmopan. In early November, the depression that would later strengthen into Hurricane Jenny brought light rainfall to Puerto Rico. The final storm, Tropical Storm Inga, dissipated on November 8, after causing no impact on land. On September 11, three hurricanes existed simultaneously – Betsy, Carla, and Debbie – the most on a single day in the Atlantic basin since 1893 and until 1998. Collectively, the storms of the 1961 Atlantic hurricane season caused about $392.34 million in damage and at least 437 fatalities.

== Season summary ==
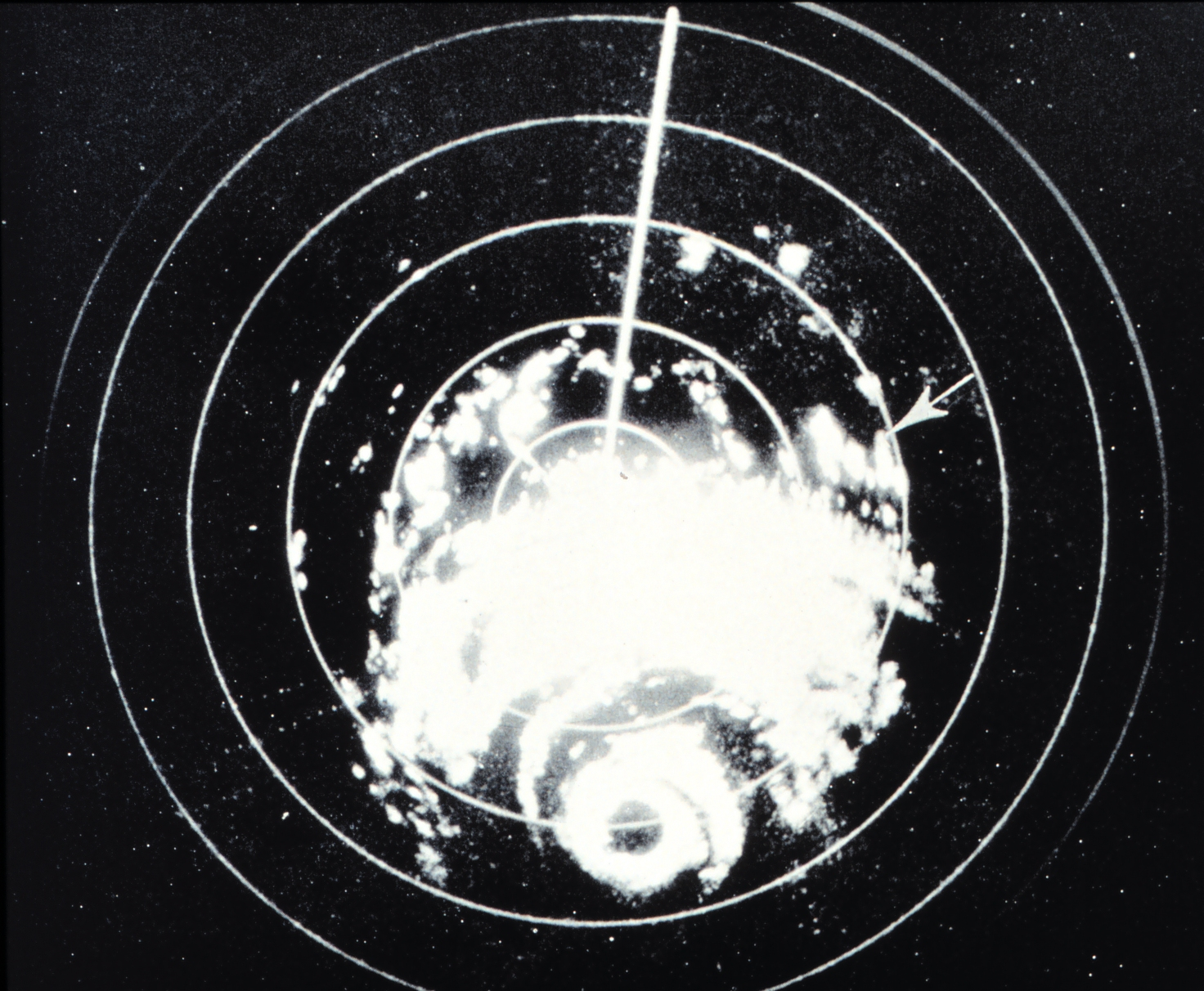
WSR-57 radar image of Hurricane Carla out of Galveston, Texas on September 10

The Atlantic hurricane season officially began on June 15. It was an above average season in which twelve tropical storms formed; this was above the 1950–2000 average of 9.6 named storms. Eight of these reached hurricane status, also above of the 1950–2000 average of 5.9. Furthermore, five storms reached major hurricane status. It was originally believed that the season had seven major hurricanes, though later analysis resulted in a downgrade of two storms. Of the five major hurricanes, two became Category 5 hurricanes. Four hurricanes and two tropical storms made landfall during the season, causing 348 deaths and $391.6 million in damage. Hurricane Debbie also caused damage and deaths, despite remaining offshore and then after becoming extratropical.

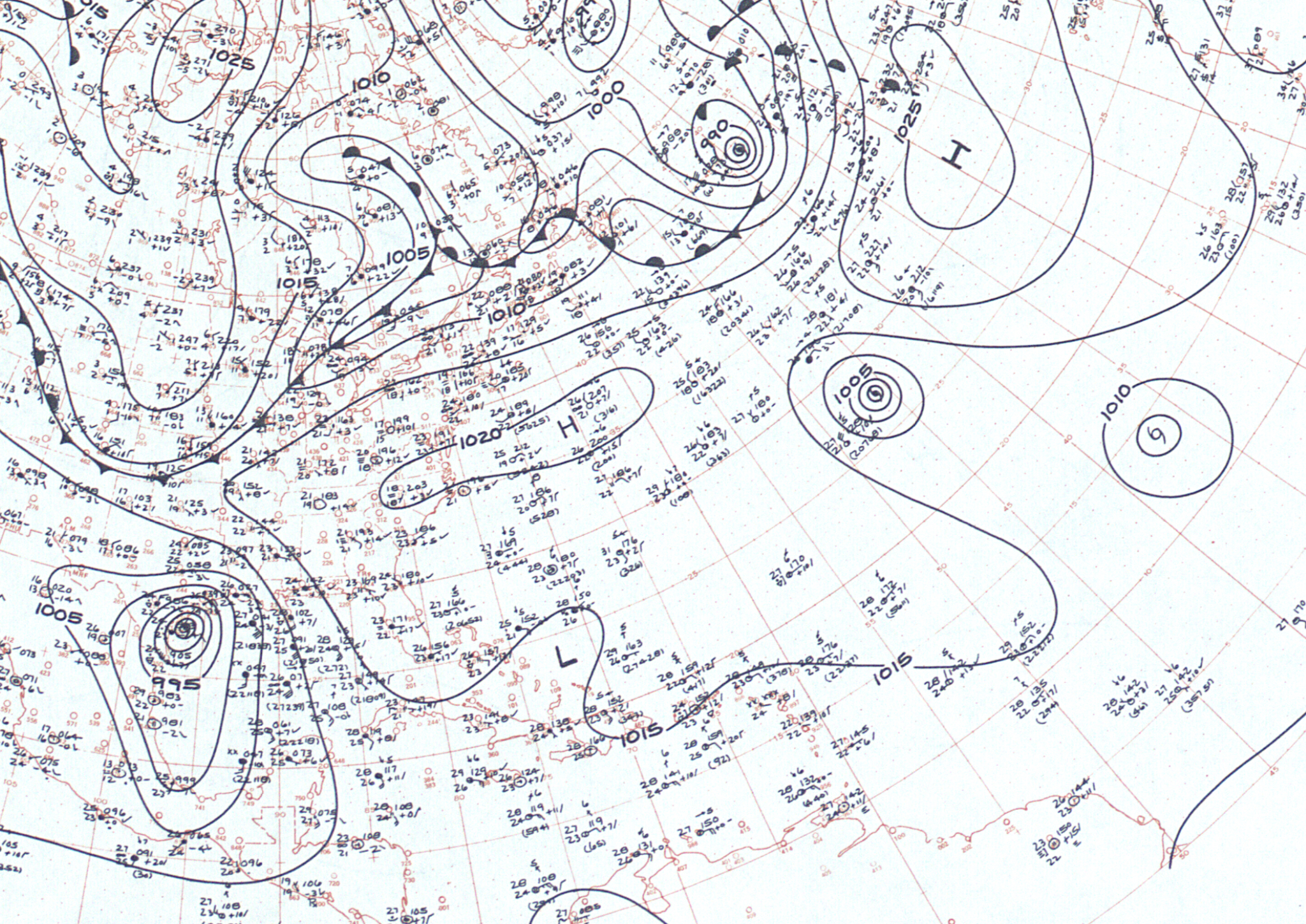
Weather map showing four active tropical cyclones in the Atlantic Ocean with Hurricanes Carla (left), Betsy (Top), Debbie and Tropical Storm Esther (Right) on September 11, 1961

Tropical cyclogenesis began with an initially unclassified tropical depression, which developed on June 10. More than a month later, Hurricane Anna formed on July 17 and dissipated on July 24. Thereafter, no other systems developed in July or the month of August. A lack of cyclonic activity in the Atlantic basin in August is rare, with such phenomenon not occurring again until the 1997 and 2022 seasons. The Atlantic basin remained dormant until Hurricane Betsy developed on September 2. During the next four days, two other tropical cyclones formed – Carla and Debbie. On September 11, the three storms – Betsy, Carla, and Debbie – existed simultaneously as hurricanes, the most in a single day since 1893 and until 1998. Esther, which developed on September 10, did not reach hurricane status until September 12. Later that day, a tropical storm that went unnamed formed over the Bahamas and moved across the East Coast of the United States for its brief duration.

Most intense Atlantic hurricane seasons (since 1850) (Note: There is an undercount bias of zero to six tropical cyclones per year between 1851 and 1885 and zero to four per year between 1886 and 1910, due to the lack of modern observation techniques, see Tropical cyclone observation. This may have led to significantly lower ACE ratings for hurricane seasons prior to 1910.)
Rank	Season	ACE value
1	1933	258.6
2	2005	245.3
3	1893	231.1
4	1926	229.6
5	1995	227.1
6	2004	226.9
7	2017	224.9
8	1950	211.3
9	1961	188.9
10	1998	181.8
(source)

After Debbie became extratropical on September 14, another tropical cyclone developed over two weeks later, Hurricane Frances. Thereafter, tropical cyclogenesis slowed in October, which featured only three systems, a second previously unclassified tropical depression, Gerda, and Hattie. The latter was the strongest tropical cyclone of the season, peaking with maximum sustained winds of 165 mph (266 km/h) and a minimum barometric pressure of 914 mbar (27.0 inHg). After weakening slightly, Hattie struck Belize on October 31, before dissipating on November 1. Later that day, Hurricane Jenny developed northeast of Antigua. Jenny remained weak for much of its duration and became extratropical on November 8. The final system, Tropical Storm Inga, formed in the Gulf of Mexico on November 4. Four days later, Inga dissipated, one week before the season officially ended.

The season's activity was reflected with an accumulated cyclone energy (ACE) rating of 189, one of the highest values recorded. ACE is, broadly speaking, a measure of the power of the hurricane multiplied by the length of time it existed, so storms that last a long time, as well as particularly strong hurricanes, have high ACEs. It is only calculated for full advisories on tropical systems at or exceeding 39 mph (63 km/h), which is the threshold for tropical storm strength.

== Systems ==
=== Hurricane Anna ===
- Category 2 hurricane (SSHWS)
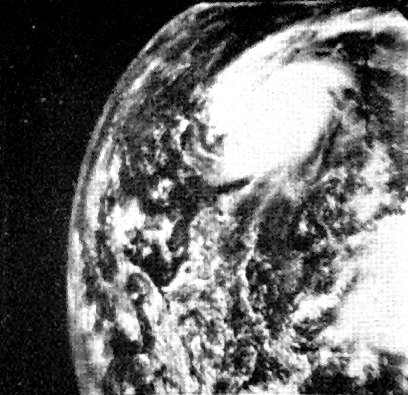
- Duration: July 17 – July 24
- Peak intensity: 105 mph (165 km/h) (1-min); 976 mbar (hPa)

A tropical wave that emerged into the Atlantic from the west coast of Africa around mid-July developed about 575 mi (925 km) northeast of Cayenne, French Guiana, late on July 17. The depression moved west-northwestward and by the following day, it intensified into a Tropical Storm Anna. After passing just south of Grenada early on July 20, Anna entered the Caribbean Sea. Favorable environmental conditions allowed Anna to reach hurricane intensity late on July 20. The cyclone continued to slowly intensifying, reaching Category 2 intensity on July 22 and peaking with maximum sustained winds of 105 mph (169 km/h). However, the storm weakened slightly before making landfall as a Category 1 hurricane in Honduras near Barra Patuca, Gracias a Dios Department, with winds of 80 mph (130 km/h). After re-emerging into the Caribbean, Anna weakened slightly further, striking Utila around 01:00 UTC on July 24 with winds of 75 mph (121 km/h). About nine hours later, the hurricane made landfall in Belize near Monkey River Town at the same intensity. Anna rapidly weakened over land and dissipated late on July 24.

As a developing tropical cyclone over the Windward Islands, Anna produced strong winds on Grenada, though damage was limited to some crops, trees, and telephone poles. Other islands experienced gusty winds, but no damage. Passing just north of Venezuela, the hurricane produced strong winds over the country, peaking as high as 70 mph (110 km/h). Strong winds caused widespread damage in northern Honduras. Throughout the country, at least 36 homes were destroyed and 228 were damaged. Severe damage in the Gracias a Dios Department left hundreds of people homeless. Additionally, high winds toppled approximately 10,000 coconut trees. Overall, Anna caused one fatality and $300,000 in damage, primarily in Central America.

=== Hurricane Betsy ===
- Category 4 hurricane (SSHWS)
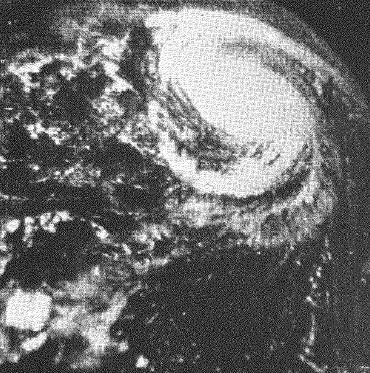
- Duration: September 2 – September 11
- Peak intensity: 130 mph (215 km/h) (1-min); 945 mbar (hPa)

In early September, a tropical wave was noted in the Intertropical Convergence Zone (ITCZ). On September 2, the disturbance was analyzed to have attained tropical storm strength, after nearby ship reports indicated strong winds associated with anomalously low barometric pressures. Moving steadily northwestward, favorable conditions allowed Betsy to quickly intensify later that day. Shortly after, a trough situated along 50°W steered Betsy to a more northerly course. Another low-pressure area later formed in the trough, perturbing the ridge to the north of Betsy for much of its initial stages, causing the hurricane's central pressure to rise, despite an increase in sustained winds. However, on September 5, a shortwave forced the low northeastward, allowing for Betsy to strengthen further.

Early on September 6, Betsy attained Category 4 hurricane strength, peaking with maximum sustained winds of 130 mph (210 km/h) and a central pressure of 945 mbar (945 hPa; 27.9 inHg), based on reconnaissance flights into the system. However, as a result of missing the short wave itself, the hurricane later weakened and fell to Category 3 intensity while located about 440 miles (710 km) east-northeast of Bermuda. Betsy weakened further to Category 2 hurricane before becoming nearly stationary beginning on September 6. Moving into higher latitudes, Betsy began to weaken, degenerating back to Category 1 hurricane intensity on late on September 8. A separate, minor trough was later able to move the system northeastwards by the following day. Betsy re-intensified into a Category 2 hurricane early on September 10, but transitioned into extratropical cyclone several hours later. The extratropical remnants continued northeastward and weakened, before executing a large loop over the far north Atlantic. The remnants dissipated well north of the Azores on September 16.

=== Hurricane Carla ===
- Category 4 hurricane (SSHWS)
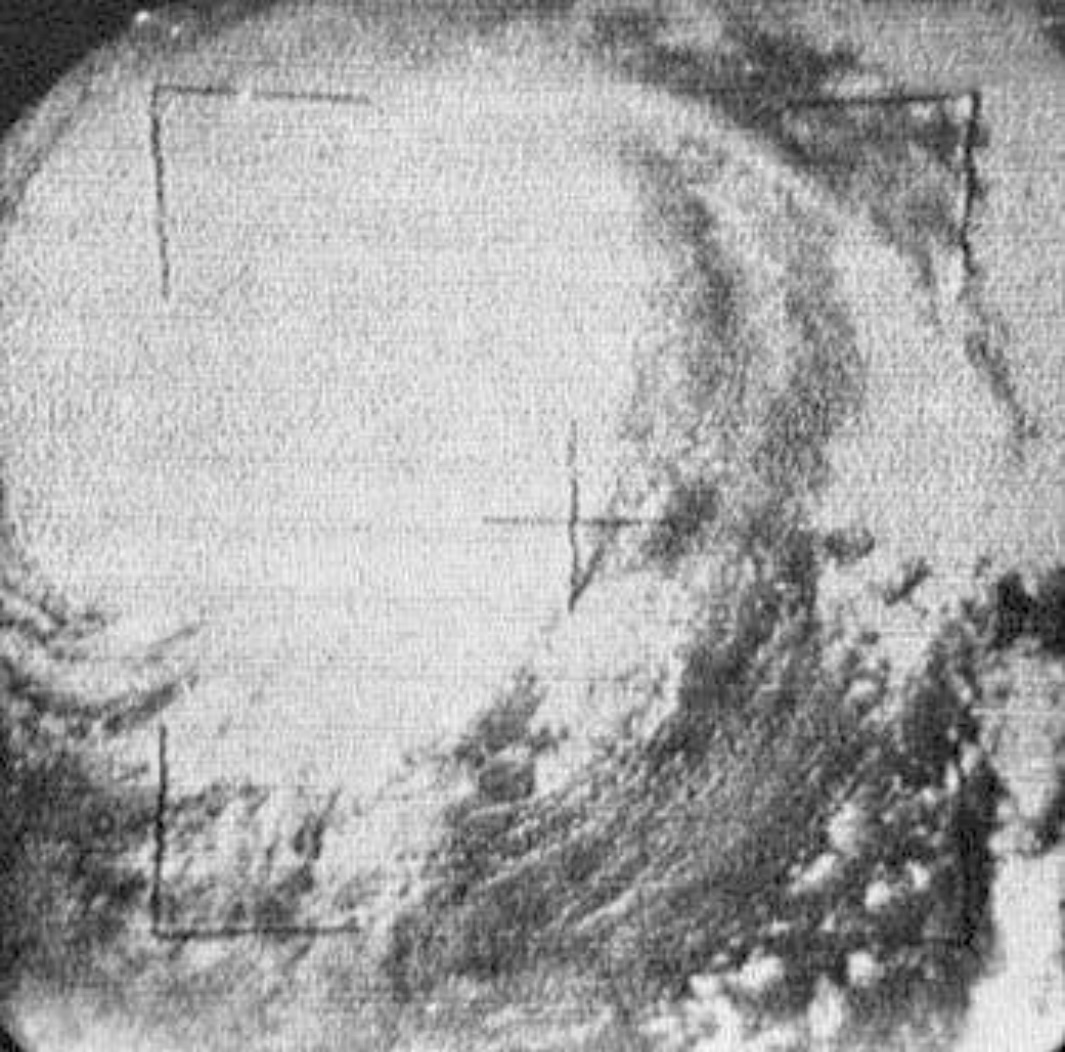
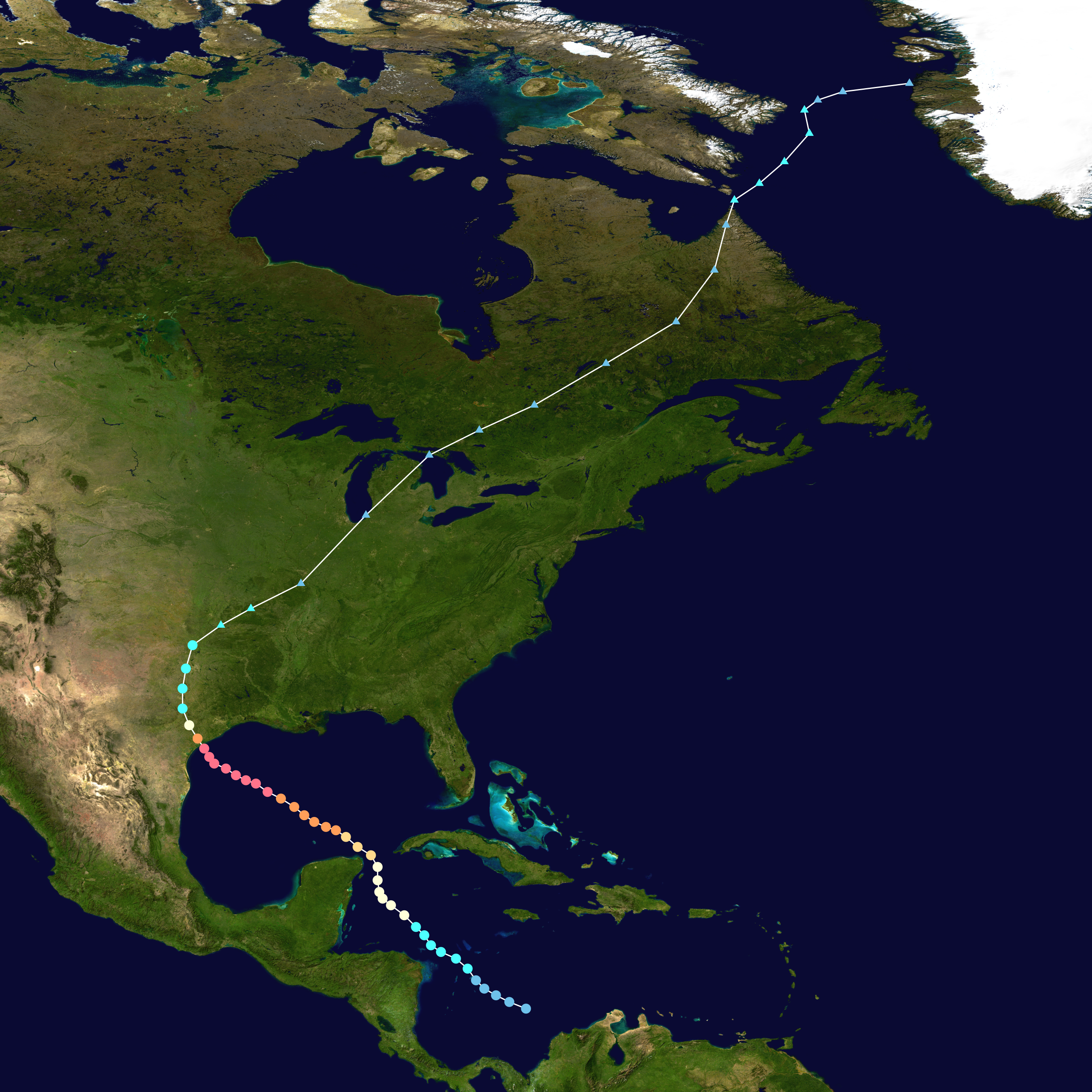
- Duration: September 3 – September 13
- Peak intensity: 145 mph (230 km/h) (1-min); 927 mbar (hPa)

A tropical depression developed from an area of squally weather embedded within the ITCZ in the southwestern Caribbean Sea on September 3. Initially a tropical depression, it strengthened slowly while heading northwestward, and by September 4, the system was upgraded to Tropical Storm Carla. About 24 hours later, Carla was upgraded to a hurricane. Shortly thereafter, the storm curved northward while approaching the Yucatán Channel. Late on September 7, Carla entered the Gulf of Mexico while passing just northeast of the Yucatán Peninsula. The cyclone reached major hurricane intensity around 12:00 UTC on the next day. Resuming its northwestward course, Carla continued intensification and on September 11, it peaked as a Category 4 hurricane. Carla made landfall near Port O'Connor, Texas, with winds of 145 mph (233 km/h). It weakened quickly inland and was reduced to a tropical storm on September 12. Heading generally northward, Carla transitioned into an extratropical cyclone on September 13, while centered over southern Oklahoma. However, the remnants continued generally northeastward and entered Canada on September 14, before dissipating near Cape Chidley early on September 16.

While crossing the Yucatán Channel, the outer bands of Carla brought gusty winds and severe local flooding in western Cuba and the Yucatán Peninsula. Although initially considered a significant threat to Florida, the storm brought only light winds and small amounts of precipitation, reaching no more than 3.15 in (80 mm). In Texas, wind gusts as high as 170 mph (270 km/h) were observed in Port Lavaca. Additionally, several tornadoes spawned in the state caused notable impacts, with the most destructive tornado striking Galveston, Texas at F4 intensity, resulting in 200 buildings being severely damaged, of which 60–75 were destroyed, eight deaths and 200 injuries. Throughout the state, Carla destroyed 1,915 homes, 568 farm buildings, and 415 other buildings. Additionally, 50,723 homes, 5,620 farm buildings, and 10,487 other buildings suffered damage. There were 34 fatalities and at least $300 million in losses in Texas alone. Several tornadoes also touched down in Louisiana, causing the destruction of 140 homes and 11 farms and other buildings, and major damage to 231 additional homes and 11 farm and other buildings. Minor to moderate damage was also reported to 748 homes and 75 farm and other buildings. Six deaths and $25 million in losses in Louisiana were attributed to Carla. Heavy rainfall occurred in several other states, especially in Kansas, where flash flooding severely damaged crops and drowned five people. Overall, Carla resulted in $325.74 million in losses and 46 fatalities. In Canada, the remnants of Carla brought strong winds to Ontario and New Brunswick, though impact was primarily limited to power outages and falling trees and branches.

=== Hurricane Debbie ===
- Category 1 hurricane (SSHWS)
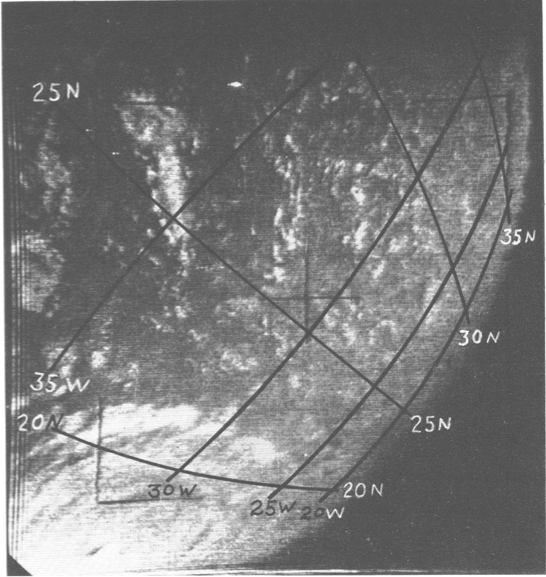
- Duration: September 5 – September 16
- Peak intensity: 90 mph (150 km/h) (1-min); 975 mbar (hPa)

A tropical disturbance was first identified in late August over Central Africa. The wave developed into a tropical depression just offshore Senegal around 12:00 UTC on September 5. It was estimated to have intensified into Tropical Storm Debbie early the next day. Several hours later, Debbie passed through the southern Cape Verde Islands as a strong tropical storm or minimal hurricane, resulting in a plane crash and the death of 60 people. Once clear of the islands, data on the storm became sparse, and the status of Debbie was uncertain over the following several days as it tracked west-northwestward and later northward. It was not until a commercial airliner intercepted the storm on September 10 that its location was certain. The following day, Debbie intensified and reached its peak intensity as a strong Category 1 hurricane with maximum sustained winds of 90 mph (140 km/h). The hurricane gradually slowed its forward motion and weakened. By September 13, Debbie's motion became influenced by the westerlies, causing the system to accelerate east-northeastward. The storm transitioned into an extratropical cyclone late on September 14 about 140 mi (225 km) west-southwest of Horta, Azores.

The remnants of Debbie soon passed east-northeastward throughout the Azores and then curved northeastward. The system deepened slightly as it neared the British Isles, skirting the coast of Western Ireland on September 16. In Ireland, Debbie brought record winds to much of the island, with a peak gust of 114 mph (183 km/h) measured just offshore. Widespread wind damage and disruption occurred, downing tens of thousands of trees and power lines. Countless structures sustained varying degrees of damage, with many smaller buildings destroyed. Agriculture experienced extensive losses to barley, corn and wheat crops. Throughout Ireland, Debbie killed 18 people, with 12 in the Republic of Ireland and six in Northern Ireland. The storm also battered parts of Great Britain with winds in excess of 100 mph (160 km/h).

=== Hurricane Esther ===
- Category 5 hurricane (SSHWS)
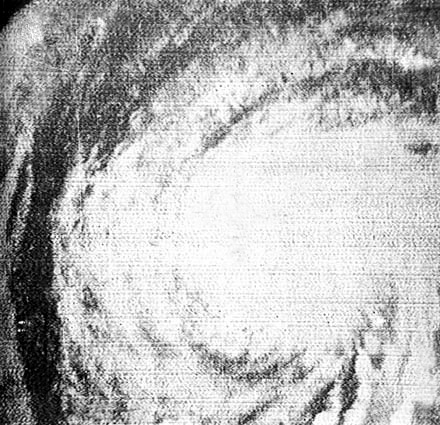
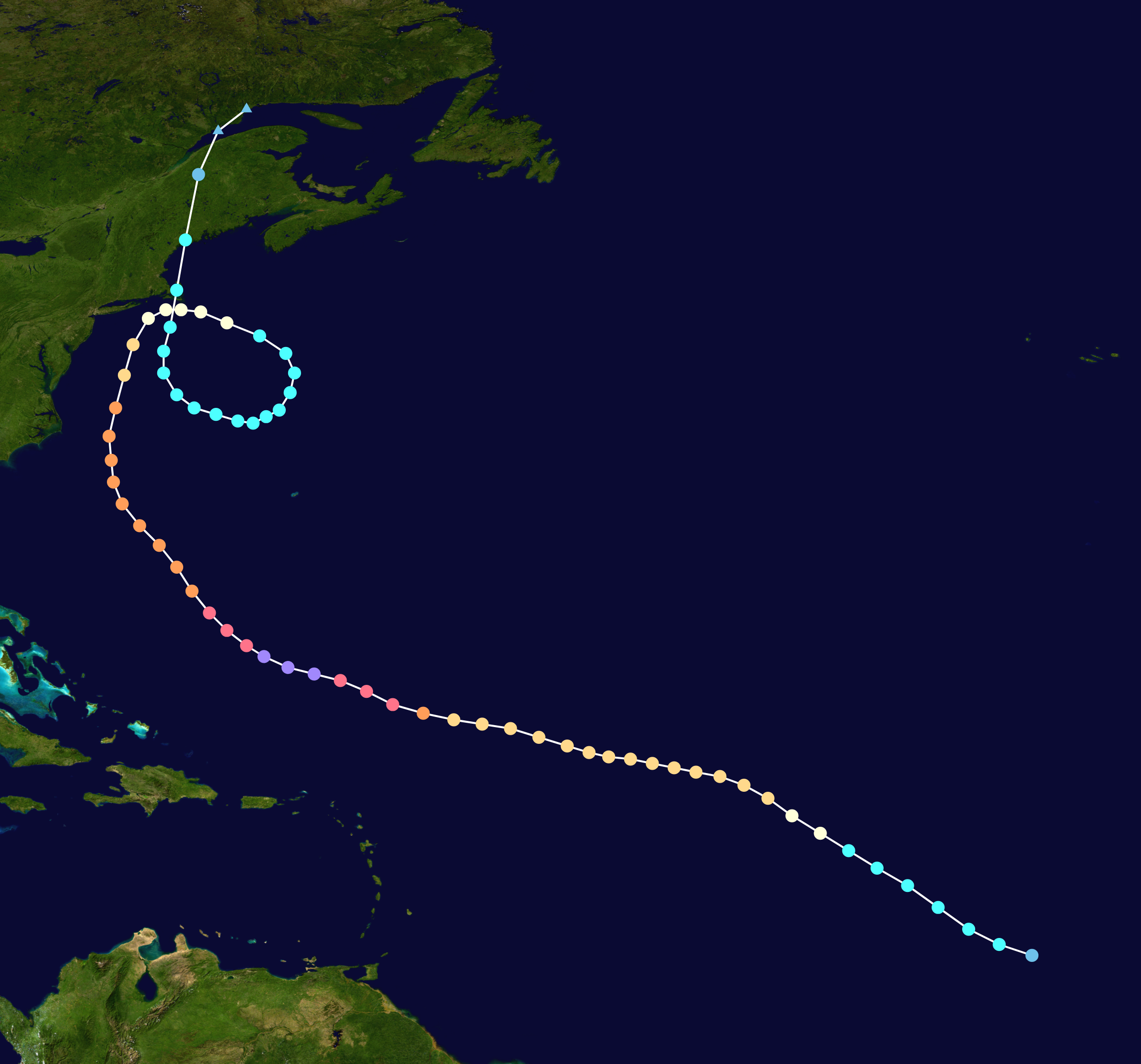
- Duration: September 10 – September 26
- Peak intensity: 160 mph (260 km/h) (1-min); 919 mbar (hPa)

On September 10, Television Infrared Observation Satellite (TIROS) III observed an area of disturbed weather well southwest of the Cape Verde Islands. Later that day, a tropical depression developed about 510 miles (820 km) west-southwest of the southernmost Cape Verde Islands. Moving northwestward, the depression strengthened into Tropical Storm Esther on September 11, before reaching hurricane intensity on the following day. Early on September 13, Esther curved westward and deepened into a major hurricane. The storm remained a Category 3 hurricane for about four days and gradually moved in west-northwestward direction. Esther strengthened into a Category 4 hurricane on September 16 and peaked as a Category 5 hurricane on the following day with sustained winds of 160 mph (260 km/h).

The storm curved north-northeastward on September 19, while offshore North Carolina. Esther began to weaken while approaching New England and fell to Category 2 intensity early on September 21. The storm turned eastward on the following day and gradually weakened to a tropical storm. It then executed a large cyclonic loop, until curving northward on September 25. Early on the following day, Esther made two landfalls in Massachusetts, first on Muskeget Island and then near South Yarmouth with winds of 60 mph (97 km/h). The storm then emerged over the Gulf of Maine and made landfall in Brunswick, Maine, around 11:00 UTC on September 26 with winds of 40 mph (64 km/h). Esther weakened to a tropical depression late on September 26 before weakening to a tropical depression and becoming extratropical over southeastern Quebec. The remnants persisted for about 12 hours, before dissipating early on September 27. Between North Carolina and New Jersey effects were primarily limited to strong winds and minor beach erosion and coastal flooding due to storm surge. In New York, strong winds led to severe crop losses and over 300,000 power outages. High tides caused coastal flooding and damaged a number of pleasure boats. Similar impact was reported in Massachusetts. Additionally, some areas observed more than 8 inches (200 mm) of rainfall, flooding basements, low-lying roads, and underpasses. Overall, damage was minor, totaling about $6 million. There were also seven deaths reported when a United States Navy P5M aircraft crashed about 120 miles (190 km) north of Bermuda.

=== Tropical Storm Six ===
- Tropical storm (SSHWS)
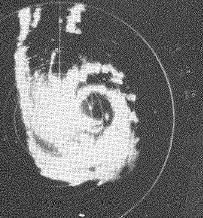
- Duration: September 12 – September 15
- Peak intensity: 65 mph (100 km/h) (1-min); 996 mbar (hPa)

TIROS III imagery indicated a vortex east of the Bahamas between September 9 and September 12. A tropical depression formed at 12:00 UTC on September 12 near Great Harbour Cay in the Bahamas, after TIROS revealed a surface circulation. The depression tracked northward and intensified into a tropical storm while located offshore North Carolina. Around 12:00 UTC September 14, it made landfall in the state near Topsail Beach, North Carolina, with winds of 45 mph (72 km/h). The storm curved accelerated northeastward and intensified despite mostly remaining over land, striking near the southern tip of the Delmarva Peninsula about nine hours later with winds of 50 mph (80 km/h). After re-emerging into the Atlantic late on September 14, the cyclone made landfall near Islip, New York, with peak winds of 65 mph (105 km/h) around 06:00 UTC on September 15, followed by another landfall near Guilford, Connecticut, about an hour later at the same intensity. The cyclone became extratropical over southern Maine around 12:00 UTC and quickly dissipated.

Impact from the storm was generally minor. In Savannah, Georgia, the storm produced an F2 tornado that blew the roof off of a lumber company building. In North Carolina, 3.12 inches (79 mm) of precipitation fell at Williamston. Strong winds lashed Rhode Island, with winds as high as 70 mph (110 km/h) in Point Judith. About 29,000 homes were left without electricity, while 1,200 lost telephone service. Hundreds of small crafts and a few ferries and barges were swamped or sank. Hurricane-force wind gusts in Massachusetts felled trees, electrical wires, and TV antennas. Some roads in the southeastern portion of the state were blocked by fallen trees. Similar impact was reported in Maine, where an F2 tornado/waterspout tracked 19.1 miles (30.7 km) from Beals through Roque Bluffs before dissipating in Dog Town just east of East Machias. Power lines were considerably damaged and numerous trees were knocked down, including two incidents where trees fell on and damaged homes. The tornado caused one injury when a man was hit by a flying wooden plank.

=== Hurricane Frances ===
- Category 4 hurricane (SSHWS)
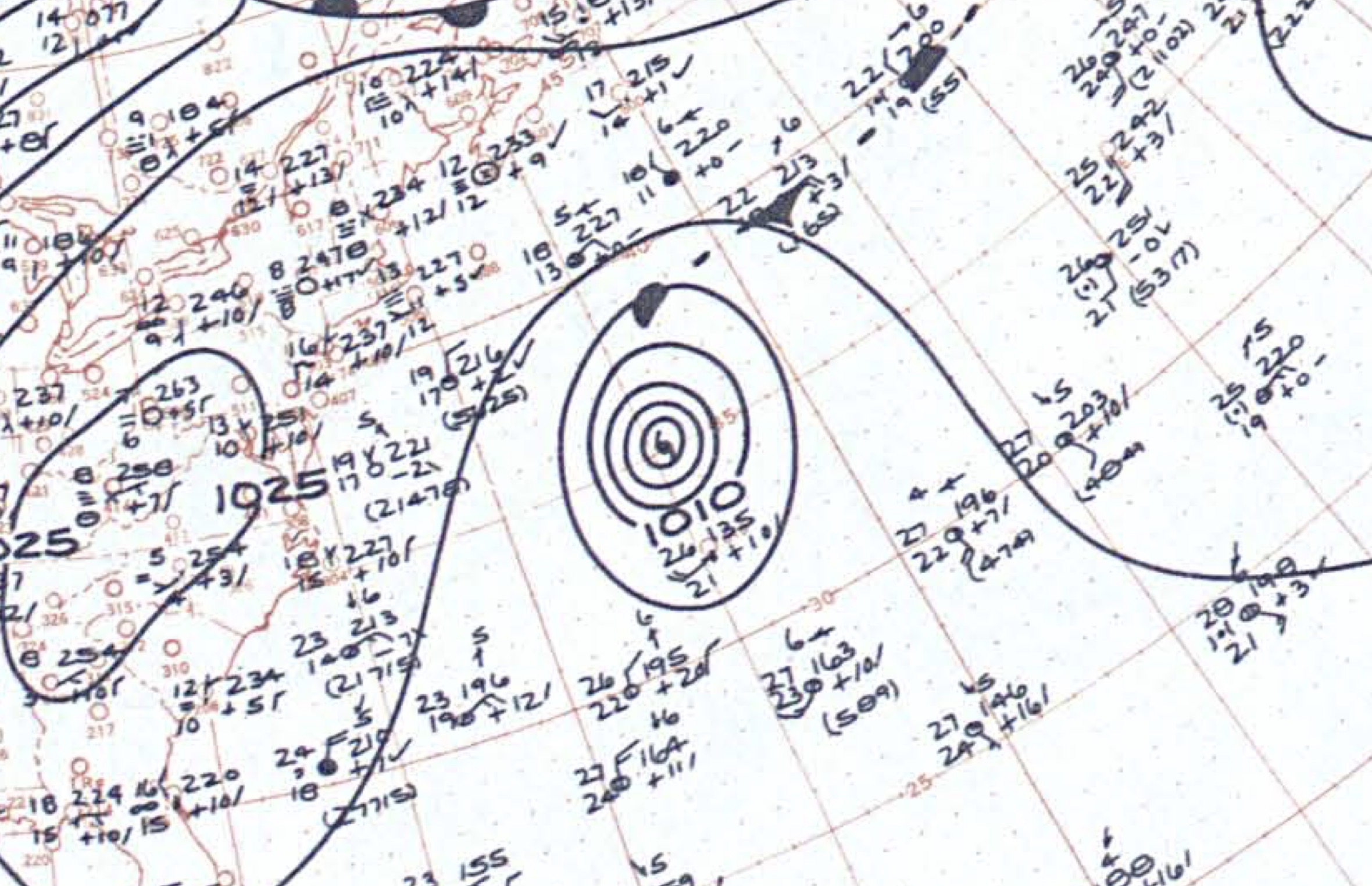
- Duration: September 30 – October 9
- Peak intensity: 130 mph (215 km/h) (1-min); 948 mbar (hPa)

A westward-moving tropical wave organized into Tropical Storm Frances on September 30, east of the northern Lesser Antilles. Six hours later, the depression strengthened into Tropical Storm Frances. Heading westward, it crossed through the Leeward Islands and entered the Caribbean Sea on October 1. Thereafter, the lack of divergence at high levels prevented significant strengthening for a few days. While situated south of Puerto Rico on October 2, Frances curved northwestward. The storm brought heavy rainfall to Puerto Rico, peaking at 10.15 inches (258 mm) in the Indiera Baja barrio of Maricao. Considerable damage to roads and bridges occurred. However, due to swift evacuations of residents by the Civil Defense and American Red Cross, no fatalities were reported.

Tracking to the northwest, Frances made landfall near Punta Cana, Dominican Republic, early on October 3 with winds of 60 mph (97 km/h). No impact was reported on the island. Later on October 3, Frances emerged into the Atlantic Ocean just southeast of the Turks and Caicos Islands. Thereafter, the storm accelerated somewhat and resumed intensification, reaching hurricane status on October 4. Around that time, it curved northeastward and deepened further. Early on October 7, Frances attained its peak intensity with winds of 130 mph (210 km/h) and a minimum barometric pressure of 948 mbar (28.0 inHg). The storm passed by Bermuda around that time, where it dropped 1.35 inches (34 mm) of precipitation. Later on October 7, Frances re-curved to the north. Early on the following day, the storm became extratropical as it approached the Gulf of Maine. The remnants curved east-northeastward and struck Nova Scotia, before dissipating early on October 10.

=== Tropical Storm Gerda ===
- Tropical storm (SSHWS)
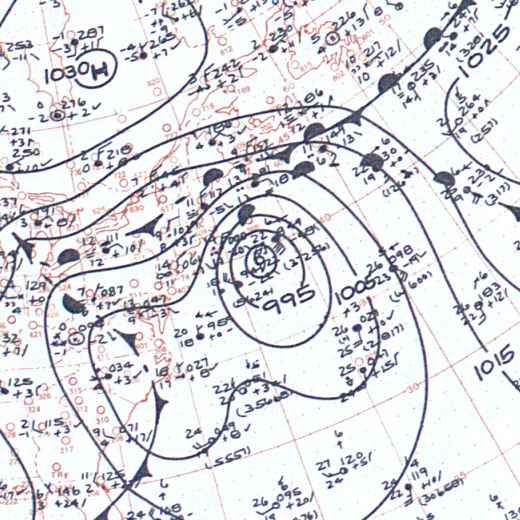
- Duration: October 17 – October 20
- Peak intensity: 70 mph (110 km/h) (1-min); 988 mbar (hPa)

A westward-moving tropical wave reached the central Caribbean by mid-October. The wave crossed Jamaica, causing flooding that damaged roads and forced many to evacuate their homes in western Kingston. Five fatalities were reported in Jamaica. Early on October 17, the wave developed into a tropical depression just southwest of Cape Cruz, Cuba. It continued northward and made another landfall near Santa Cruz del Sur several hours later. The depression also brought heavy rainfall to eastern Cuba, which resulted in seven deaths. After striking Cuba, the depression emerged into the Atlantic early on October 18 as it intensified into Tropical Storm Gerda.

Moving across the Bahamas later on October 18, Gerda accelerated to the north-northeast. The storm curved northeastward on October 20, while peaking with winds of 70 mph (110 km/h). However, a Texas Tower offshore Massachusetts observed hurricane-force winds. At 00:00 UTC on October 20, Gerda transitioned into an extratropical cyclone while situated about 165 miles (265 km) southeast of Nantucket, Massachusetts. Damage from the storm in New England was "about the same as that from a typical wintertime northeaster". The remnants of Gerda moved northeastward and then to the east, before dissipating between Newfoundland and the Azores late on October 22.

=== Hurricane Hattie ===
- Category 5 hurricane (SSHWS)
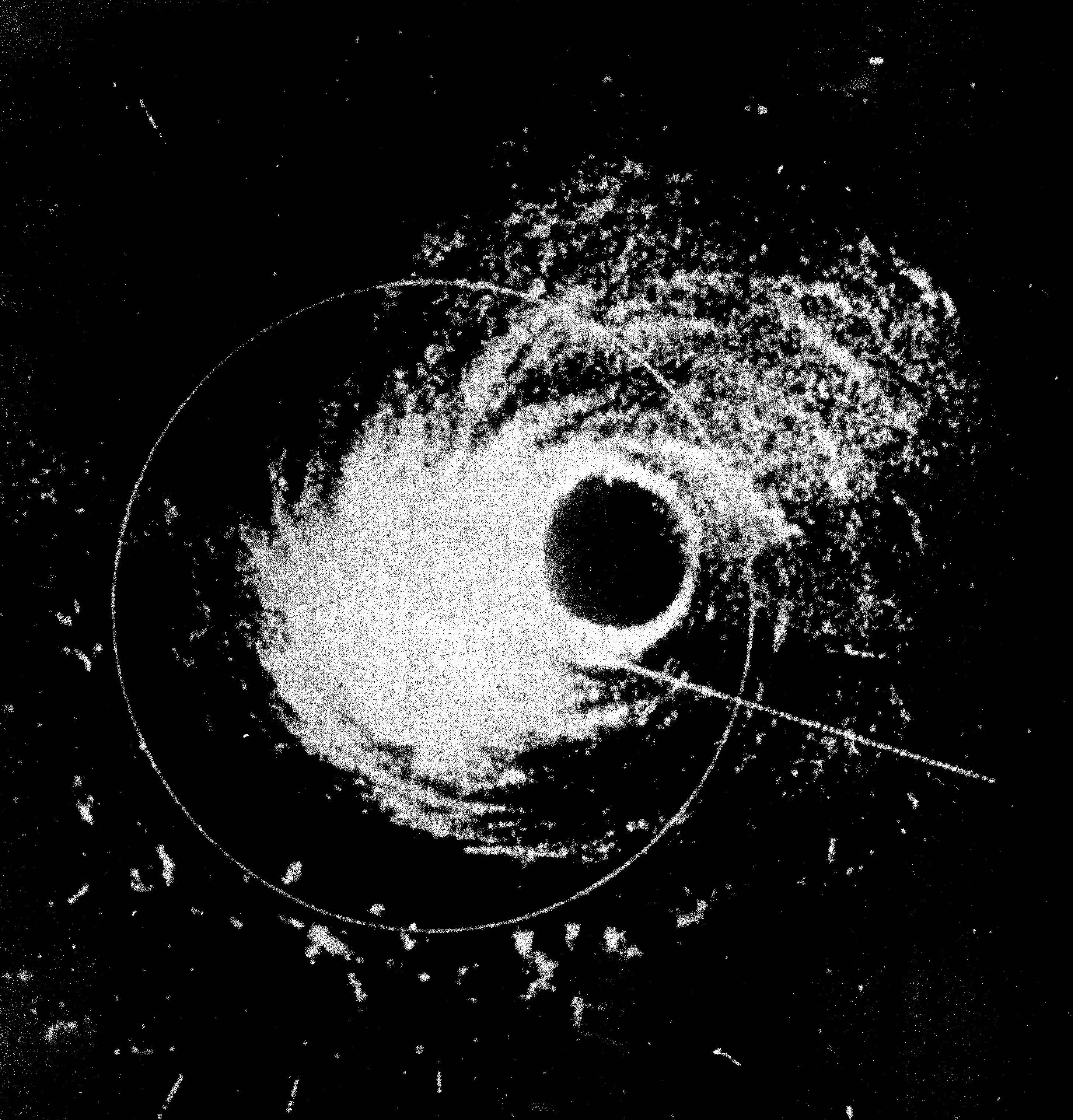
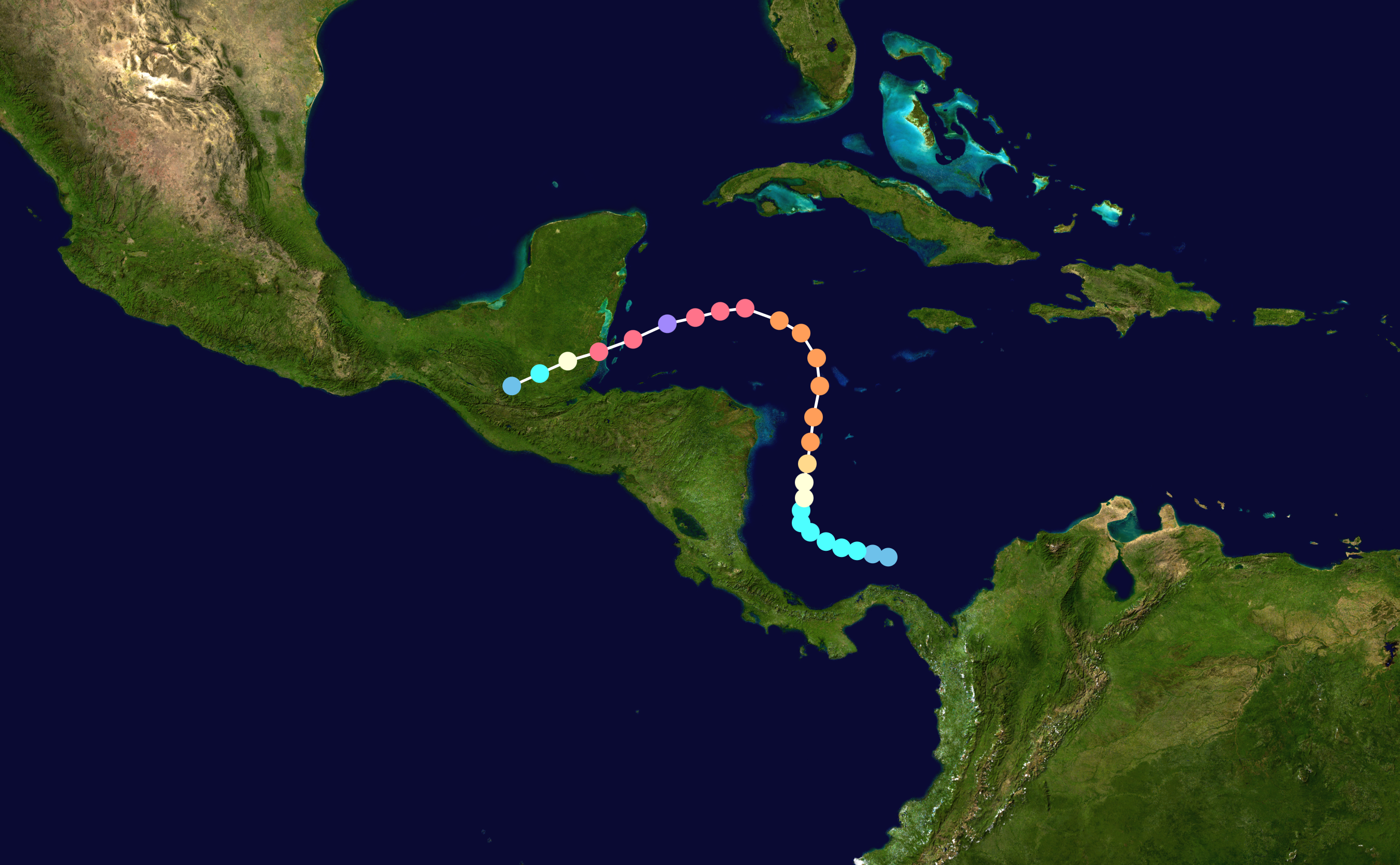
- Duration: October 27 – November 1
- Peak intensity: 165 mph (270 km/h) (1-min); 914 mbar (hPa)

In late October, an area of low pressure persisted in the western Caribbean Sea for several days. Around 00:00 UTC on October 26, a tropical depression developed about 100 mi (160 km) northeast of Colón, Panama. Approximately 12 hours later, the depression intensified into Tropical Storm Hattie. Moving towards the north and north-northeast, the storm quickly gained hurricane status early on October 28 and reached major hurricane intensity that same day. Hattie turned towards the west to the east of Jamaica and strengthened into a Category 5 hurricane with maximum sustained winds of 165 mph (266 km/h) on October 31. The storm then weakened to a Category 4 hurricane prior to landfall south of Belize City, British Honduras, with winds of 150 mph (240 km/h). Continuing southwest, the storm rapidly weakened over the mountainous terrain of Central America, dissipating on November 1. It was originally thought that the remnants may have contributed to the development of Tropical Storm Simone in the eastern Pacific Ocean, but a 2019 reanalysis concluded that the remnants of Hattie instead became a Central American gyre.

Hattie first affected regions in the southwestern Caribbean, producing hurricane-force winds and causing one death on San Andres Island. It was initially forecast to continue north and strike Cuba, which prompted evacuations. Little effects were reported as Hattie turned to the west, although rainfall reached 11.5 in (290 mm) on Grand Cayman. The worst damage was in the country of Belize. The former capital, Belize City, was flooded by a powerful storm surge and high waves and affected by strong winds. The territory governor estimated 70% of the buildings in the city were damaged, which left over 10,000 people homeless. The damage was severe enough that it prompted the government to relocate inland to a new city, Belmopan. In the territory, Hattie left about $60 million in damage and caused 307 deaths. The government estimated that Hattie was more damaging than a hurricane in 1931 that killed 2,000 people; the lower toll for Hattie was due to advance warning. Elsewhere in Central America, the hurricane killed 11 people in Guatemala and one in Honduras.

=== Hurricane Jenny ===
- Category 1 hurricane (SSHWS)
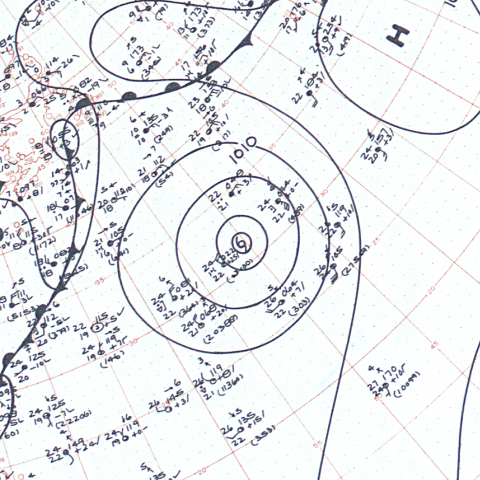
- Duration: November 1 – November 10
- Peak intensity: 80 mph (130 km/h) (1-min); 974 mbar (hPa)

A surface trough of low pressure developed in the eastern Caribbean Sea on October 30. The trough split, with the northern portion spawning a tropical depression near Antigua at 00:00 UTC on November 2. The precursor to Jenny brought light rainfall to Puerto Rico, peaking at 4.97 inches (126 mm) in Río Blanco, Naguabo. Moving northeastward ahead of an upper-level trough, the depression remained weak for over three days. On November 3, the system curved eastward, before briefly turning to the southeast on November 4. The depression tracked in a circular path during the next 24 hours, moving northeastward, north-northwestward, and then west-northward. Finally, the system strengthened into Tropical Storm Jenny early on November 5.

Jenny intensified further and reached hurricane status at 12:00 UTC on November 6. Later that day, the United States Weather Bureau began advisories and described Jenny as having "characteristic of many storms in the sub-tropics late in the hurricane season." Around 18:00 UTC on November 6, Jenny attained its peak intensity with maximum sustained winds of 80 mph (130 km/h) and a minimum barometric pressure of 974 mbar (28.8 inHg). Thereafter, the storm briefly decelerated and weakened, falling to tropical storm intensity around midday on November 7. Jenny curved northeastward and continued to weaken, transitioning into an extratropical cyclone late on November 10 about 545 mi (875 km) east of Cape Race, Newfoundland. The extratropical remnants continued to move northeastward and weakened before being absorbed by a larger extratropical cyclone on the following day.

=== Tropical Storm Inga ===
- Tropical storm (SSHWS)
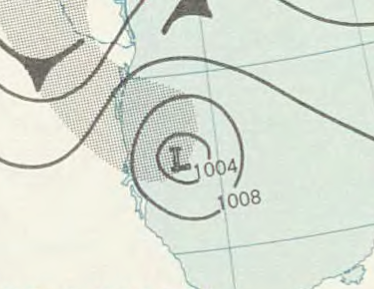
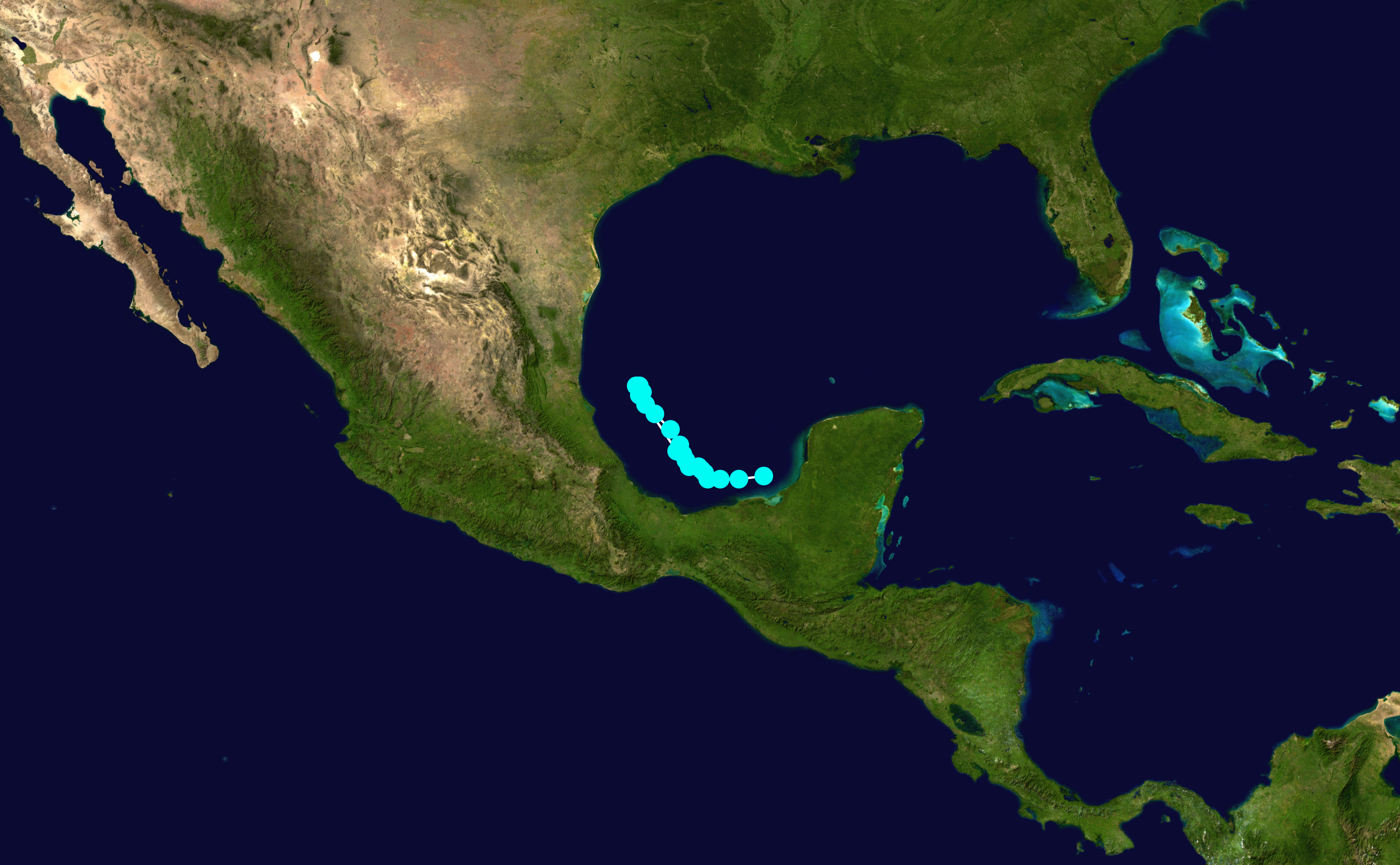
- Duration: November 4 – November 8
- Peak intensity: 70 mph (110 km/h) (1-min); 997 mbar (hPa)

Early on November 4, the SS Navigator encountered a weather system in the Gulf of Mexico that produced northwesterly winds of 81 to 92 mph (130 to 148 km/h). Reconnaissance aircraft data indicated that Tropical Storm Inga developed at 00:00 UTC on November 4, while located about 145 miles (235 km) northeast of Veracruz. A strong high pressure system and a cold front entering the Gulf of Mexico from Texas caused the storm to move southward and then southeastward. Inga slowly strengthened and peaked as a 70 mph (110 km/h) tropical storm early on November 7. Thereafter, the storm became nearly stationary and began weakening. By 12:00 UTC on November 8, Inga dissipated in the Bay of Campeche, as reconnaissance aircraft found no closed circulation.

=== Tropical Storm Twelve ===
- Tropical storm (SSHWS)
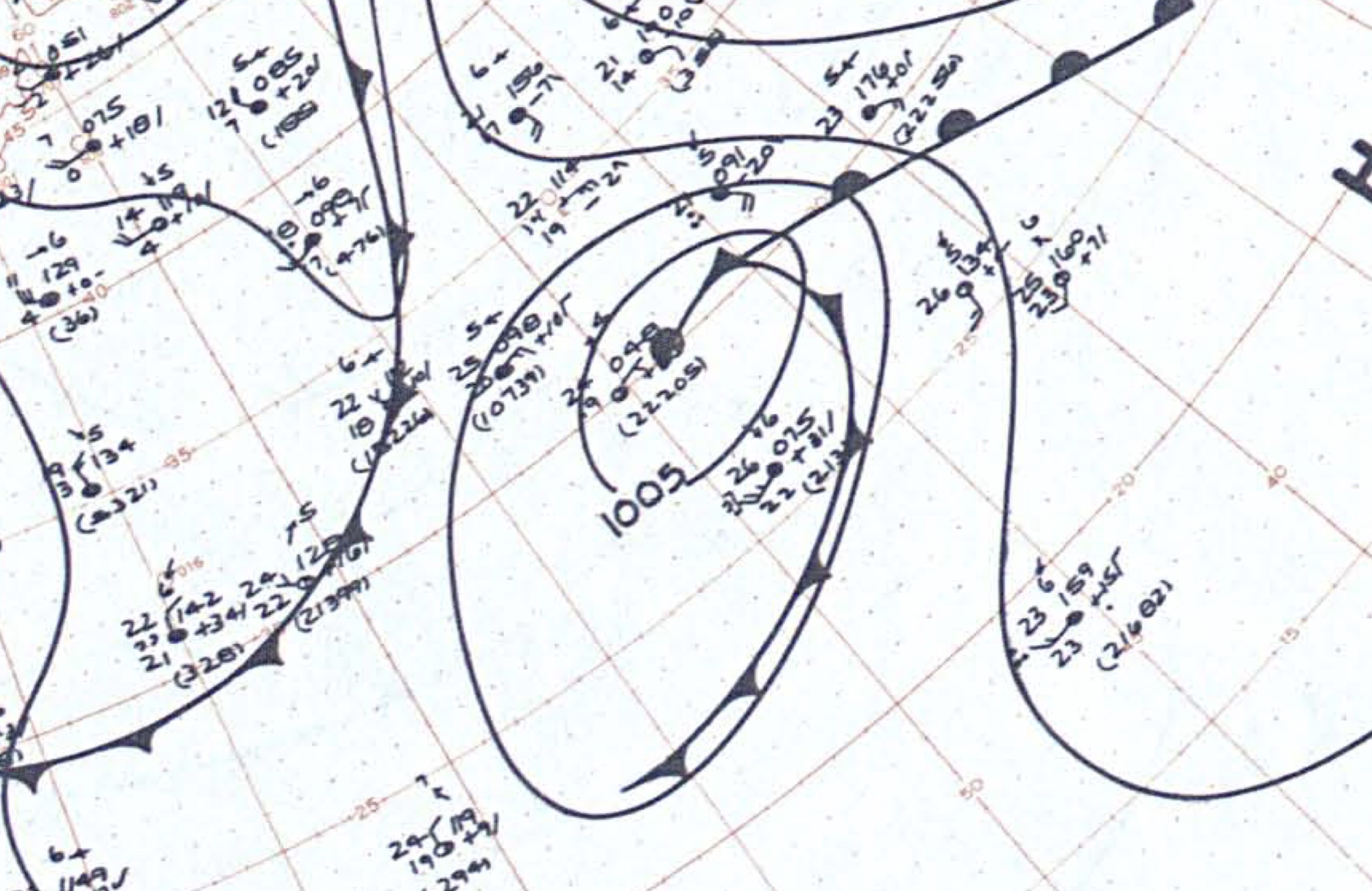
- Duration: November 17 – November 20
- Peak intensity: 60 mph (95 km/h) (1-min); ≤992 mbar (hPa)

A stationary front across the central Atlantic Ocean led to the development of a low pressure area by November 16, northeast of the Lesser Antilles. A day later, it is estimated that a tropical depression developed, although due to the system's large size, it was possible it was a subtropical cyclone. The depression moved northeastward and slowly intensified, based on observations from nearby ships. On November 19, the depression strengthened into a tropical storm. The storm strengthened to reach peak winds of 60 mph (97 km/h) on November 20. By that time, a cold front was approaching the storm, causing the storm to transition into an extratropical cyclone on November 21; later that day, the front absorbed the former tropical storm.

=== Other storms ===
In addition to the twelve systems reaching at least tropical storm status, two other cyclones formed but remained at tropical depression intensity. The first such system, also the first tropical cyclone of the season, originated from a tropical wave about 35 mi (55 km) east of Palm Bay, Florida, on June 10. Moving quickly northeastward, the depression may have reached tropical storm intensity on June 12 but degenerated into a trough offshore New England on the next day. On October 12, a trough developed into a tropical depression about halfway between Bermuda and North Carolina. This depression also moved quickly northeastward and merged with a frontal boundary by October 15.

A report from Mexico indicates that a tropical depression formed off the west coasts of Tabasco and Coatzacoalcos. The depression significantly impacted the northern portions of Veracruz with heavy rainfall on June 30. However, the Atlantic hurricane best track does not list this system as a tropical depression.

== Storm names ==
The following list of names was used for named storms (tropical storms and hurricanes) that formed in the North Atlantic in 1961. Storms were named Frances, Hattie, Inga and Jenny for the first (and only, in the case of Hattie) time in 1961.

- Anna
- Betsy
- Carla
- Debbie
- Esther
- Frances
- Gerda
- Hattie
- Inga
- Jenny
- Kara (unused)
- Laurie (unused)
- Martha (unused)
- Netty (unused)
- Orva (unused)
- Peggy (unused)
- Rhoda (unused)
- Sadie (unused)
- Tanya (unused)
- Virgy (unused)
- Wenda (unused)

=== Retirement ===
The names Carla and Hattie were retired after the season due to their severity of impacts. They were replaced with Carol and Holly, respectively, for the 1965 season.

== Season effects ==
This is a table of all of the storms that formed in the 1961 Atlantic hurricane season. It includes their name, duration, peak classification and intensities, areas affected, damage, and death totals. Deaths in parentheses are additional and indirect (an example of an indirect death would be a traffic accident), but were still related to that storm. Damage and deaths include totals while the storm was extratropical, a wave, or a low, and all of the damage figures are in 1961 USD.

Saffir–Simpson scale
TD	TS	C1	C2	C3	C4	C5

1961 Atlantic hurricane season statistics
Storm name	Dates active	Storm category at peak intensity	Max 1-min wind mph (km/h)	Min. press. (mbar)	Areas affected	Damage (US$)	Deaths	Ref(s).
Depression	June 10 – 12	Tropical depression	35 (55)	Unknown	None	None	None	
Anna	July 20 – 24	Category 2 hurricane	105 (165)	976	Windward Islands, Colombia, Venezuela, Central America, Jamaica	$300,000	1	
Betsy	September 2 – 11	Category 4 hurricane	130 (215)	945	None	None	None	
Carla	September 3 – 13	Category 4 hurricane	145 (230)	927	Central America, Yucatán Peninsula, Central United States, Eastern Canada	$325.74 million	43	
Debbie	September 6 – 16	Category 1 hurricane	90 (150)	975	Cape Verde, Azores, Ireland, United Kingdom, Norway, Soviet Union	Unknown	60	
Esther	September 10 – 26	Category 5 hurricane	160 (260)	919	North Carolina, Virginia, New England, Mid-Atlantic, Atlantic Canada	$6 million	0 (7)	
Six	September 12 – 15	Tropical storm	65 (100)	996	The Bahamas, East Coast of the United States, Atlantic Canada	Minimal	None	
Frances	September 30 – October 9	Category 4 hurricane	130 (215)	948	Lesser Antilles, Puerto Rico, Dominican Republic, Bermuda, Maine, Atlantic Canada	Unknown	None	
Depression	October 12 – 14	Tropical depression	35 (55)	Unknown	None	None	None	
Gerda	October 16 – 20	Tropical storm	70 (110)	988	Jamaica, Cuba, The Bahamas, New England, Atlantic Canada	Unknown	7	
Hattie	October 27 – November 1	Category 5 hurricane	165 (270)	914	Central America (Belize)	$60.3 million	319	
Jenny	November 1 – 10	Category 1 hurricane	80 (130)	974	Puerto Rico, Leeward Islands	None	None	
Inga	November 4 – 8	Tropical storm	70 (110)	997	Mexico	None	None	
Twelve	November 17 – 20	Tropical storm	60 (95)	992	None	None	None	
Season aggregates
14 systems	June 10 – November 20		165 (270)	914		$392.34 million	448 (7)	

== See also ==
- 1961 Pacific hurricane season
- 1961 Pacific typhoon season
- 1961 North Indian Ocean cyclone season
- Australian region cyclone seasons: 1960–61 1961–62
- South Pacific cyclone seasons: 1960–61 1961–62
- South-West Indian Ocean cyclone seasons: 1960–61 1961–62
