= Hurricane Debbie (1961) =

Category 1 Atlantic hurricane

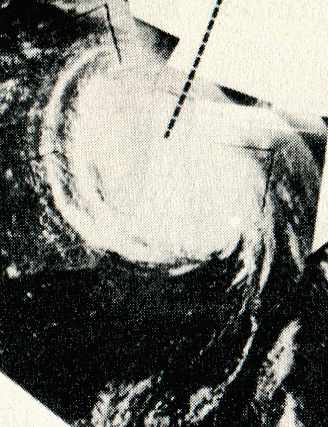
- Debbie at peak intensity, on 11 September

Meteorological history
- Formed: 6 September 1961
- Extratropical: 15 September 1961
- Dissipated: 19 September 1961

Category 1 hurricane
- 1-minute sustained (SSHWS/NWS)
- Highest winds: 90 mph (150 km/h)
- Lowest pressure: 975 mbar (hPa); 28.79 inHg

Overall effects
- Fatalities: 78
- Damage: $50 million (1961 USD) (estimated)
- Areas affected: Cape Verde Islands, Azores, Ireland, United Kingdom, Norway, Soviet Union
- IBTrACS
- Part of the 1961 Atlantic hurricane season

Hurricane Debbie was a moderate tropical cyclone which had significant impacts in Ireland as an extratropical cyclone. The fourth named storm of the 1961 Atlantic hurricane season, Debbie originated from a well-defined tropical disturbance that was first identified in late August over Central Africa. Tracking generally westward, the system moved off the coast of Senegal on 5 September into the Atlantic Ocean. At the time, it was estimated to have become a tropical depression, but forecasters did not issue advisories on the system until two days later. Late on 6 September, Debbie passed through the southern Cape Verde Islands as a moderate tropical storm. Once clear of the islands, data on the storm became sparse, and the status of Debbie was uncertain over the following several days as it tracked west-northwestward and later northward. It was not until a commercial airliner intercepted the storm on 10 September that its location became certain. The following day, Debbie intensified and reached its peak intensity as a Category 1 hurricane on the Saffir–Simpson hurricane scale, with maximum winds of 140 km/h (90 mph).

Maintaining its peak intensity for almost a day, the hurricane gradually slowed its forward motion and weakened. By 13 September, Debbie's motion became increasingly influenced by the westerlies, causing the system to accelerate east-northeastwards. The system passed over the western Azores as an extratropical cyclone bearing hurricane-force winds on 15 September. The system subsequently deepened explosively as it neared Ireland, skirting the coast of western Ireland (perhaps briefly making landfall near Connemara) from mid-morning onwards on 16 September, before rushing northwards towards the Outer Hebrides of Scotland that evening. The peaks of the winds over Ireland occurred during the morning and early afternoon on a Saturday (market day) when many people were outdoors doing their shopping. The remnants of the storm later weakened and turned eastwards, striking Norway and the Soviet Union, before dissipating on 19 September.

Striking Ireland as an extremely powerful mid-latitude storm, the remnants of Debbie brought record winds to large parts of the island, with a maximum wind gust of 181 km/h (113 mph) at the Met Éireann meteorological station of Malin Head (county Donegal), an absolute Irish station record which was later surpassed by storm Éowyn, and which equals the strongest wind gust recorded at a land-based lowland site in the Republic of Ireland until storm Éowyn. New data uncovered by Graham and Smart (2021), also shows that the same station recorded a possible new Irish mean (10-min) windspeed record of 141 km/h (87 mph) during four unique consecutive hours of hurricane-force winds on the Beaufort Scale that day. These winds caused widespread damage and disruption, downing tens of thousands of trees and power lines. Countless structures sustained varying degrees of damage, with many smaller buildings destroyed. Agriculture experienced extensive losses to barley, corn and wheat crops. Debbie killed 18 people – 12 in the Republic of Ireland and six in Northern Ireland. It caused US$40–50 million in damage in the Republic (Note: All damage totals are in 1961 values.) and at least £1.5 million (US$4 million) in Northern Ireland. The storm also battered parts of Great Britain with winds in excess of 100 mph (160 km/h).

== Meteorological history ==
Map plotting the storm's track and intensity, according to the Saffir–Simpson scale Map key Saffir–Simpson scale Tropical depression (≤38 mph, ≤62 km/h) Tropical storm (39–73 mph, 63–118 km/h) Category 1 (74–95 mph, 119–153 km/h) Category 2 (96–110 mph, 154–177 km/h) Category 3 (111–129 mph, 178–208 km/h) Category 4 (130–156 mph, 209–251 km/h) Category 5 (≥157 mph, ≥252 km/h) Unknown Storm type Tropical cyclone Subtropical cyclone Extratropical cyclone, remnant low, tropical disturbance, or monsoon depression

During late August and into early September 1961, an unusual series of low-level disturbances developed over Central and West Africa and into the eastern Atlantic Ocean. One of these systems, that probably formed over Central Africa at the end of August, became increasingly organised as it moved over Nigeria on 1 September. As the disturbance travelled steadily westward, its mid-level circulation became well defined, and the accompanying low-level centre gradually followed suit. An upper-level anticyclone accompanied the storm during this entire period, providing a favorable upper-air regime for strengthening. According to a post-storm study in 1962, all the necessary environmental ingredients were available to the disturbance while it was over land; the only factor inhibiting earlier development was a lack of access to the warm waters. Around 12:00 UTC on 5 September, the low emerged off the coast of Senegal as a strong tropical depression. At the time, the system had a central pressure below 1,006 mbar (29.7 inHg), and sustained winds of 56 km/h (35 mph) were reported in Bissau, Guinea-Bissau. As the system neared Cape Verde, it continued to intensify; early on 7 September, reports from the nearby Danish tanker Charlotte Maersk indicated that the system was already at or near hurricane intensity.

Late on 6 September, Debbie passed over the southern Cape Verde Islands as a strong tropical storm or low-end hurricane. Continuing on a west-northwest path, mainly in response to a large area of high pressure over the eastern Atlantic, the system continued to intensify. Sea surface temperatures in the region averaged 27 °C (80 °F), supportive of tropical development. At 19:13 UTC on 7 September, a picture from TIROS-3 showed that an eye had already developed and banding features covered an area more than 480 km (300 mi) from the centre. Debbie was not classified operationally as a tropical storm until 22:00 UTC on 7 September, at which time the centre was estimated to be about 890 km (550 mi) west-southwest of Sal Island. Over the following three days, virtually no data was available on the hurricane and no reliable estimates on its intensity could be made. During this time, the storm was estimated to have taken a more north-westerly course over the open ocean. It was not until a KLM flight encountered the storm on 10 September that an accurate positioning of the hurricane could be made.

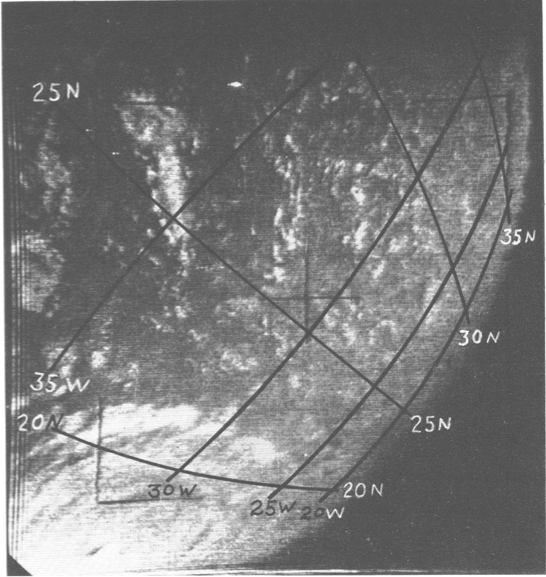
By 7 September, Hurricane Debbie (lower left corner) already featured a clear, well-defined eye.

After maintaining a nearly steady course for three days, Hurricane Debbie turned northward and slowed as it neared a break in the ridge previously steering it west-northwestward. During the evening of 11 September, a United States Navy Aircraft reconnaissance mission into the storm estimated sustained winds of 180–190 km/h (110–120 mph) and a central pressure of 976 mbar (976 hPa; 28.8 inHg); based on these data, reanalysis in 2019 concluded that Debbie peaked as a modern-day Category 1 hurricane on the Saffir–Simpson hurricane scale with winds of 140 km/h (90 mph). After maintaining its winds for over 18 hours, the system weakened and turned sharply towards the east-northeast in response to the upper-level westerlies. By the afternoon of 13 September, Debbie quickly accelerated towards the Azores. Early on 15 September, the storm acquired extratropical characteristics and passed over the western Azores with winds estimated at 130 km/h (80 mph) before turning more northeasterly. While the Weather Bureau's preliminary report noted that Debbie acquired characteristics of an extratropical cyclone on 15 September, until 2019 the system was still classified as a hurricane at that time and listed as such until its final position was noted. Prior to reanalysis, the best track supplied by the Bureau and the National Hurricane Center's hurricane database maintained the system as a tropical cyclone until the afternoon of 16 September, when the system was last observed.

The system moved towards Ireland and began to deepen. The remnants of Debbie eventually brushed the coast of Western Ireland near Achill Island during the morning of 16 September with sustained winds of 137 km/h (85 mph). Shortly after striking Ireland, the system was operationally confirmed to have transitioned into an extratropical cyclone as it re-emerged into the northeast Atlantic Ocean. While passing between Ireland and Scotland, the system continued to deepen, achieving an estimated central pressure of 950 hPa (28.05 inHg). After clearing Great Britain, the hurricane's remnants turned more easterly, later impacting Norway and the Soviet Union before dissipating on 19 September.

== Impact ==
=== Republic of Ireland ===
Notable wind measurements (Note: Values marked with † represent all-time record measurements as of 2012.)
Location	Maximum gust	10-minute sustained
Belmullet	148 km/h (92 mph)	106 km/h (66 mph)
Birr	150 km/h (93 mph)	72 km/h (45 mph)
Claremorris	169 km/h (105 mph)	111 km/h (69 mph) †
Clones	160 km/h (100 mph) †	93 km/h (58 mph)
Dublin Airport	119 km/h (74 mph)	63 km/h (39 mph)
Kilkenny	121 km/h (75 mph)	74 km/h (46 mph)
Malin Head	182 km/h (113 mph) †	126 km/h (78 mph)
Mullingar	146 km/h (91 mph) †	84 km/h (52 mph) †
Roche's Point	132 km/h (82 mph)	97 km/h (60 mph)
Rosslare	134 km/h (83 mph)	87 km/h (54 mph)
Shannon Airport	172 km/h (107 mph) †	111 km/h (69 mph) †
Valentia Observatory	163 km/h (101 mph) †	108 km/h (67 mph)

As early as 13 September, residents were made aware that a storm might strike parts of Ireland with hurricane-force winds. Two days later, forecasters believed the storm would take a more southerly course towards France. This forecast was later withdrawn as the storm failed to turn eastward. Consequently, gale warnings were issued for much of western Ireland on the morning of 16 September, hours before the brunt of the storm arrived. Fearing building collapses, officials in County Galway closed markets for the duration of the storm.

As a powerful extratropical cyclone on 16 September, post-Debbie became one of the most intense storms on record to strike Ireland. The storm brought hurricane-force winds to a large part of the country, with wind gusts peaking at 183 km/h (114 mph) off the coast of Arranmore. At several locations, all-time wind gusts and ten-minute sustained wind records were broken. Post-Debbie was the strongest storm, in terms of atmospheric pressure, to strike Belmullet during the month of September, with a pressure of 961.4 hPa (28.39 inHg) measured in Belmullet. Rainfall from the storm was relatively minor, with rainfall rates peaking at 9 mm (0.35 in) per hour at the Valentia Observatory.

The greatest damage occurred in a swath stretching from Kerry to Limerick as well as the counties of Sligo and Donegal. In these areas, the storm's powerful winds damaged or destroyed many buildings and downed trees and power lines. In the hardest hit areas, communication was not restored for over four days. Many roads were blocked by debris for up to two days. Crops and trees were badly damaged. Approximately two percent of the trees in the forestry industry were snapped or uprooted. In general, corn and wheat crops fared better than expected, with only 25–30 percent being lost; however, some farmers reported barley losses greater than 50 percent. Downed trees from the storm wreaked havoc, leaving considerable damage and loss of life behind. All told, Hurricane Debbie was responsible for 12 deaths in the Republic of Ireland. Four people were killed in County Cavan – a widow, her two daughters and granddaughter – after a tree fell on their car. Five deaths resulted from fallen trees and three others were from building collapses. At least 50 people were injured, few of which were serious.

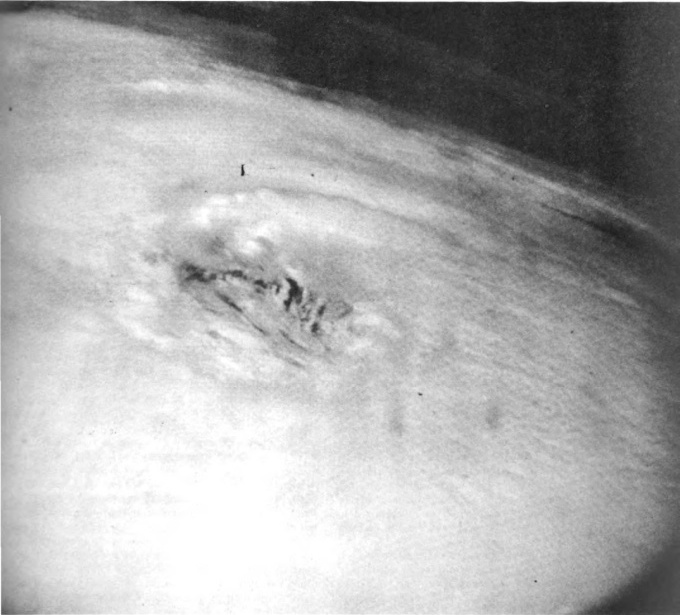
Satellite picture of Hurricane Debbie on 13 September over the open Atlantic, taken by the Mercury-Atlas 4 spacecraft

Newspapers reported that the city of Galway "resembled a bombed area," referring to the scale of damage caused by the winds. In nearby Ballygar, two barns were destroyed, one of which had debris strewn over a wide area. Hurricane-force winds battered Tuam for several hours, leaving most buildings damaged. Nearly every structure in Connemara was damaged and many homes lost their roofs. At Cork Airport, windows at the control tower were blown out and a construction crane was knocked over. Residents in Loughrea dubbed Saturday, 16 September 1961, as "The Day Of The Big Wind" in light of the extensive damage. Damage in Roscommon was "impossible to calculate," as all power and communication around the town was lost. In Limerick, 15 people were injured. Across County Cavan, thousands of trees were snapped or uprooted, leaving many towns temporarily cut off as roads were blocked and communications lost. Many structures sustained damage, which ranged from broken slate roofing to flattened barns. Most towns across the county were left without power and telephone service. Residents described the storm as "the worst in living memory."

Along the coast, rough seas spurred by the winds damaged docks and flooded some coastal regions. Offshore, waves reached heights of 14 m (45 ft) near Arranmore. Dozens of ships were torn from their moorings and run aground at various ports, some of which were found 180 m (200 yd) inland. In Salthill, three marinas were damaged with forty vessels damaged or sunk. Between 11:00 a.m. and 1:00 p.m. local time, onshore winds from the storm caused the River Shannon to flow backwards and rise 1.2 m (4 ft). Hundreds of acres of land, including potato and cabbage plots, were left several feet underwater. Many roads were submerged, making travel impossible in the area. The combination of strong winds and sea spray from the storm caused extensive defoliation of vegetation up to 16 km (10 mi) inland. Spray from the River Foyle reportedly travelled 91 m (100 yd).

In the wake of the storm, more than 1,000 Electricity Supply Board (ESB) personnel were deployed to restore power. In some areas, locals worked together to provide others with fresh food after electricity was lost. Fire brigades were sent on patrol to quell any looting. In Galway, ESB repair crews worked through labor and supply shortages to restore power and telephone service despite recent strikes in the company. By 23 September, officials in the city appealed to the Government for funding to deal with the aftermath of the storm. Uncertainty over whether some of the cost could be footed by landowners themselves resulted in disagreement over how much aid to request. Due to the severity of damage to the electrical grid, there were numerous requests made to the ESB to build underground power cables, especially in Galway.

=== Northern Ireland ===
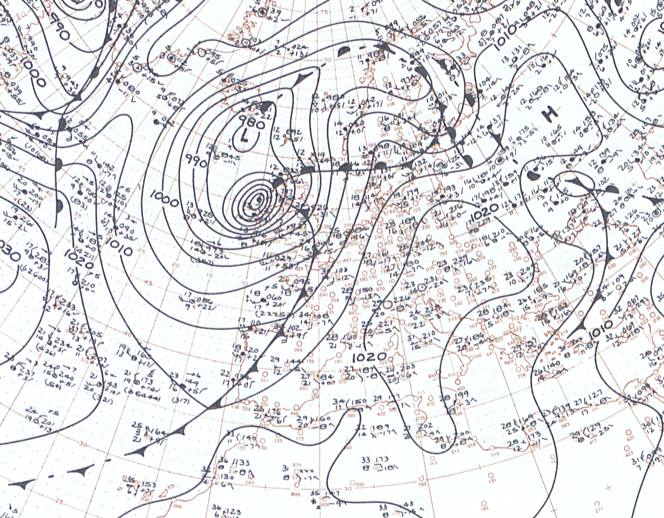
Surface weather analysis of Debbie as an extratropical cyclone over northwestern Europe on 16 September

Exceptionally strong winds from the storm buffeted parts of Northern Ireland. The winds downed tens of thousands of trees and more than 1,000 telephone lines across the region. Countless roads across Northern Ireland were blocked by debris and major rail lines had to suspend service. There was severe damage in the city of Derry where a newly built school was destroyed. Losses in the city alone amounted to £500,000 (US$1.4 million). In Lagan Valley, a brick community hall was destroyed. An estimated 200 homes and two churches in Strabane were damaged. The town's labour exchange building was severely damaged as well. In a local cemetery, many tombstones were uprooted from concrete foundations and destroyed. A newly built fire station in Clogher collapsed after its roof was blown off. Several people were injured in Belfast after a glass ceiling collapsed in a bus station and a piece of corrugated roofing blew in from a nearby building.

Six people were killed in Northern Ireland, mostly due to fallen trees: two in County Fermanagh and one each in Cookstown, Dungannon, Omagh, and elsewhere in Tyrone. The cereal crop in Northern Ireland suffered greatly due to Debbie, with half of the yield being lost. Losses from the crop were estimated at £1 million (US$2.8 million). In the wake of the storm, military ambulances from the Royal Army Medical Corps were dispatched to parts of West Tyrone. Power repair crews were dispatched for nearly a week repairing downed wires across Northern Ireland. Many public authorities paid tribute to the workers for their tireless work.

=== Elsewhere ===
After passing through Ireland, the storm brought strong winds and heavy rain to parts of Scotland and Wales, resulting in some damage and flooding in the region. On the coast of Lancashire and the Isle of Man, sand storms were reported.

Unsettled weather in the Cape Verde Islands brought about by Tropical Storm Debbie was blamed for the deaths of 60 people and a plane crash on 6 September. Strong winds were also reported from the Bay of Biscay to locations in northern Norway.

== See also ==
- Other tropical cyclones named Debbie
- List of Category 1 Atlantic hurricanes
- Tropical cyclone effects in Europe
- Hurricane Charley (1986)
- Hurricane Lili (1996)
- Hurricane Ophelia (2017)
