= List of storms named Debbie =

The name Debbie has been used for six tropical cyclones worldwide: four in the Atlantic Ocean and two in the Australian region.

In the Atlantic:

- Tropical Storm Debbie (1957) – struck the Florida Panhandle
- Hurricane Debbie (1961) – Category 1 hurricane that hit Ireland as an extratropical storm
- Tropical Storm Debbie (1965) – crossed the northeastern Yucatán Peninsula as a depression and dissipated offshore from Mississippi
- Hurricane Debbie (1969) – Category 3 major hurricane that brushed Newfoundland

In the Australian region:

- Cyclone Debbie (2003) – Category 3 severe tropical cyclone that made landfall in the Northern Territory
- Cyclone Debbie (2017) – Category 4 severe tropical cyclone that made landfall in Queensland

== See also ==
- Storm Debi (2023) – a European windstorm with a similar name.
