= Hurricane Anna (1961) =

Category 2 Atlantic hurricane in 1961

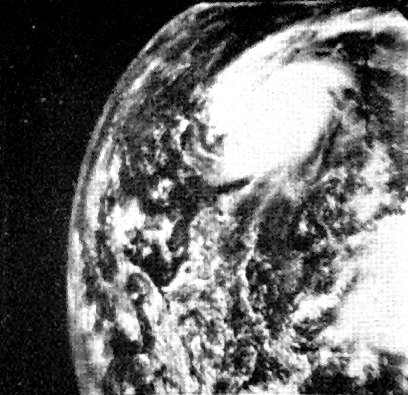
- Anna near peak intensity on July 21

Meteorological history
- Formed: July 20, 1961
- Dissipated: July 24, 1961

Category 2 hurricane
- 1-minute sustained (SSHWS/NWS)
- Highest winds: 105 mph (165 km/h)
- Lowest pressure: 976 mbar (hPa); 28.82 inHg

Overall effects
- Fatalities: 1 direct
- Damage: $300,000 (1961 USD)
- Areas affected: Venezuela, Leeward Antilles, Colombia, Jamaica, Nicaragua, Honduras, Belize, Guatemala, Mexico
- IBTrACS
- Part of the 1961 Atlantic hurricane season

Hurricane Anna impacted Central America and the Windward Islands in July 1961. The first tropical cyclone and first hurricane of the 1961 Atlantic hurricane season, Anna developed on July 20 from an easterly wave located in the Intertropical Convergence Zone (ITCZ) over the Windward Islands. Initially a tropical storm, it moved westward across the Caribbean Sea. Favorable environmental conditions allowed Anna to reach hurricane intensity late on July 20. Early on the following day, the storm strengthened into a Category 2 hurricane on the modern-day Saffir–Simpson hurricane wind scale. Intensification continued, and on July 22, Anna peaked with maximum sustained winds of 105 mph (169 km/h). The hurricane then weakened slightly while approaching the coast of Honduras. Further weakening occurred; when Anna made landfall in Belize (then known as British Honduras) on July 24, winds decreased to 80 mph (130 km/h). Anna rapidly weakened over land and dissipated later that day.

As a developing tropical cyclone over the Leeward Islands, Anna produced strong winds over Grenada, though damage was limited to some crops, trees, and telephone poles. Other islands experienced gusty winds, but no damage. Passing just north of Venezuela, the hurricane produced strong winds over the country, peaking as high as 70 mph (110 km/h). Strong winds caused widespread damage in northern Honduras. Throughout the country, at least 36 homes were destroyed and 228 were damaged. Severe damage in the Gracias a Dios Department left hundreds of people homeless. Additionally, high winds toppled approximately 5,000 coconut trees. Overall, Anna caused a fatality and $300,000 in damage (1961 USD), (Note: All damage figures are in 1961 United States dollar, unless otherwise noted) primarily in Central America.

== Meteorological history ==
Map plotting the storm's track and intensity, according to the Saffir–Simpson scale Map key Saffir–Simpson scale Tropical depression (≤38 mph, ≤62 km/h) Tropical storm (39–73 mph, 63–118 km/h) Category 1 (74–95 mph, 119–153 km/h) Category 2 (96–110 mph, 154–177 km/h) Category 3 (111–129 mph, 178–208 km/h) Category 4 (130–156 mph, 209–251 km/h) Category 5 (≥157 mph, ≥252 km/h) Unknown Storm type Tropical cyclone Subtropical cyclone Extratropical cyclone, remnant low, tropical disturbance, or monsoon depression

The origins of Hurricane Anna were likely from an easterly wave located over Africa. On July 16, Television Infrared Observation Satellite 3 (TIROS-3) imagery showed a cloud mass situated about 1,020 miles (1,640 km) west-southwest of the southernmost islands of Cape Verde. The existence of an easterly wave was not confirmed by United States Navy reconnaissance aircraft and ship reports until the following day, at which time the system was located over 445 miles (716 km) east of Antigua. Although no circulation existed while the wave approached the Windward Islands, significant amounts of deep convection was associated with the system and located near the Intertropical Convergence Zone (ITCZ). Early on July 20, ship reports indicated a developing circulation between Grenada and Trinidad; squalls on the former island produced wind gusts as strong as 50 mph (80 km/h). According to HURDAT – the North Atlantic hurricane database – the system developed into Tropical Storm Anna at 0000 UTC on July 20, as confirmed by a reconnaissance aircraft flight.

Situated about 25 miles (40 km) east-northeast of Tobago with an initial wind speed of 40 mph (64 km/h), Anna immediately began to strengthen while moving slightly north of due west. The first advisory on Anna, issued at 1330 UTC on July 20, reported sustained winds of 60 mph (97 km/h). Later that day, the storm was upgraded to a hurricane after a reconnaissance aircraft reported hurricane-force winds. Anna then deepened more steadily, becoming a Category 2 hurricane early on July 21. At 1200 UTC on the next day, Anna attained its peak intensity with maximum sustained winds of 105 mph (169 km/h) and a minimum barometric pressure of 976 mbar (28.8 inHg). Early on July 23, Anna weakened to a Category 1 hurricane while approaching the northern coast of Honduras. Around 12:00 UTC on the following day, Anna made landfall in a rural area of Stann Creek District, Belize, with winds of 80 mph (130 km/h). Late on July 24, the system weakened to a tropical storm and then dissipated.

== Preparations ==
The United States Weather Bureau issued tropical cyclone watches and warnings for Venezuela, Curaçao, Bonaire and Aruba. In Jamaica, meteorologists forecast that the storm would bypass the island to the south without causing any effects. As Anna continued westward, it was predicted to make landfall in either northern Nicaragua or southeastern Honduras. Residents in those countries were advised to take precautions ahead of the storm. Central Americans residing along Gulf of Honduras were also warned about 10 feet (3.0 m) tides and strong winds. As the storm neared Honduras, small boats and other water craft were advised to remain in port. Additionally, a hurricane watch was posted for the Swan Islands. In Belize, the threat of the storm forced 100 residents to evacuate their homes, while numerous businesses were closed down. At Belize Harbor, many ships and boats were moved upstream inland. The hurricane was also forecast to bring heavy rainfall to the mountainous areas of Belize, causing a concern for flash flooding. Additionally, Belize's Church Welfare Service began to ship clothing and other materials in anticipation of the hurricane.

== Impact ==
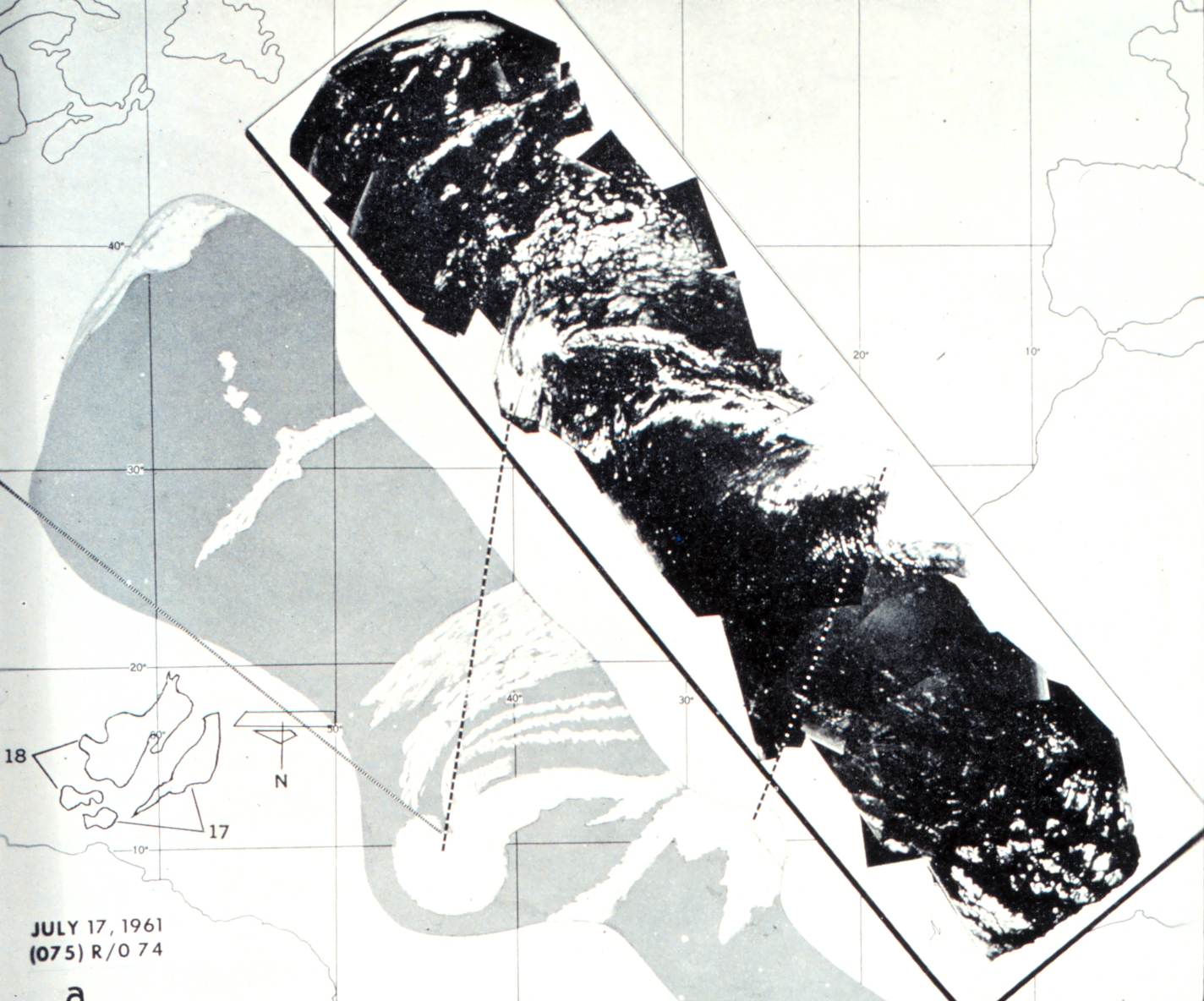
The precursor to Hurricane Anna.

In Grenada, Anna produced wind gusts of 50 mph (80 km/h). Damage from the storm's impact on Grenada was limited to banana crops, trees, and telephone poles. Winds were light on Barbados and Saint Lucia, reaching only 29 mph (47 km/h) on both islands. Damage on Trinidad was minor. In northern Venezuela and the ABC Islands, the storm produced winds of 50–70 mph (80–113 km/h) in Curaçao, Los Hermanos and La Blanquilla; A weather station in Aruba reported winds of 50 mph (80 km/h).

In Honduras, damage from Anna was moderate and limited to the Atlantic coast. A weather station in Tela recorded rainfall of 0.29–1.5 inches (7.4–38.1 millimetres) over a two-day period, and another station in Puerto Cortés measured 2 inches (51 mm). In Plaplaya, the storm damaged 215 homes. In Trujillo, a number of buildings suffered damage. At Limón, nine houses were destroyed and eighteen more were left uninhabitable. Serious damage also occurred in Gracias a Dios Department, where hundreds of people were left homeless. On the Bay Islands, nine houses were demolished and thirteen suffered damage. High winds toppled about 5,000 coconut trees on Útila. Damage from Anna in Honduras amounted to $300,000. One person drowned and 12 other were injured, and victims required food and medical aid in Anna's wake. In Belize, Anna produced waves 7–10 ft (2.1–3.0 m) and gusty winds. Though unspecific, there were reports of considerable damage in the country.

== See also ==
- 1961 Atlantic hurricane season
- Hurricane Abby (1960)
- Hurricane Greta–Olivia
- Hurricane Iris
- Hurricane Felix
