= 1931 British Honduras hurricane =

Category 4 Atlantic hurricane in 1931

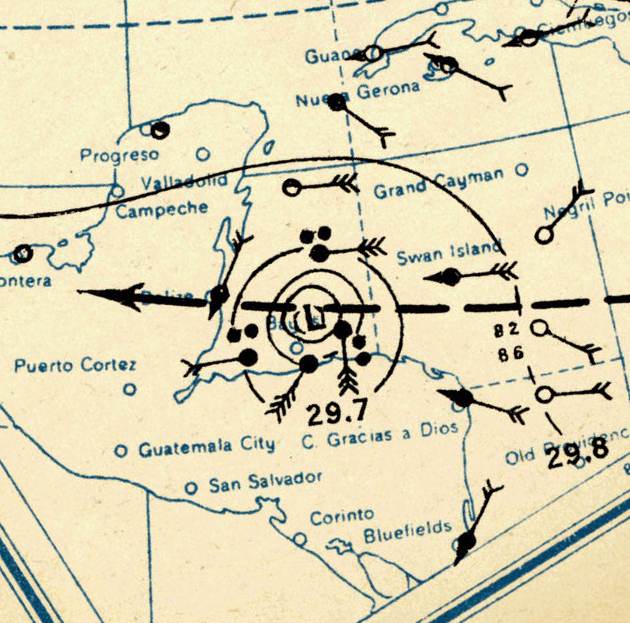
- Surface weather analysis of the hurricane on 10 September

Meteorological history
- Formed: September 6, 1931
- Dissipated: September 13, 1931

Category 4 major hurricane
- 1-minute sustained (SSHWS/NWS)
- Highest winds: 130 mph (215 km/h)
- Lowest pressure: 952 mbar (hPa); 28.11 inHg

Overall effects
- Fatalities: 2,500
- Damage: $7.5 million (1931 USD)
- Areas affected: British Honduras; Mexico
- IBTrACS
- Part of the 1931 Atlantic hurricane season

The 1931 British Honduras hurricane was the deadliest hurricane in the history of British Honduras (known as Belize since 1973), killing an estimated 2,500 people. The hurricane was first detected as a tropical wave off the west coast of Africa on 29 August. Moving westward, the disturbance remained relatively weak until 6 September, when it was first classified as a tropical cyclone just west of the Windward Islands. The depression gradually intensified, reaching tropical storm intensity within the first six hours following tropical cyclogenesis. The cyclone intensified further to hurricane intensity by 8 September. Strengthening and organisation remained gradual until the storm reached the Gulf of Honduras, by which time it began to rapidly intensify, reaching Category 4 hurricane intensity on 10 September. The hurricane subsequently made landfall in Belize City with maximum sustained winds of 130 mph (215 km/h). Moving across the Yucatán Peninsula, the tropical cyclone weakened, and continued to do so when it moved across the Bay of Campeche. This track brought it to a second landfall north of Tampico, Mexico, as a tropical storm on 13 September. Once inland, the storm quickly weakened and dissipated later that day.

Possibly due to celebrations of the anniversary of the defeat of Spanish conquerors by the British in 1798, there was little warning of the storm in British Honduras. At St. George's Caye, many structures were washed away by abnormally high tides and storm surge. Belize City was devastated, with the entire city being inundated with at least 5 ft (1.5 m) of water. Property on six streets was completely swept away, while overall 70% of the city was destroyed. Among the buildings severely damaged or demolished included many buildings and resident halls at St. John's College and the U.S. Embassy building; the Consul suffered fatal injuries during the collapse of the building. Further inland, severe damage to agriculture occurred. Overall, the storm left $7.5 million (1931 USD) in damage.

== Meteorological history ==
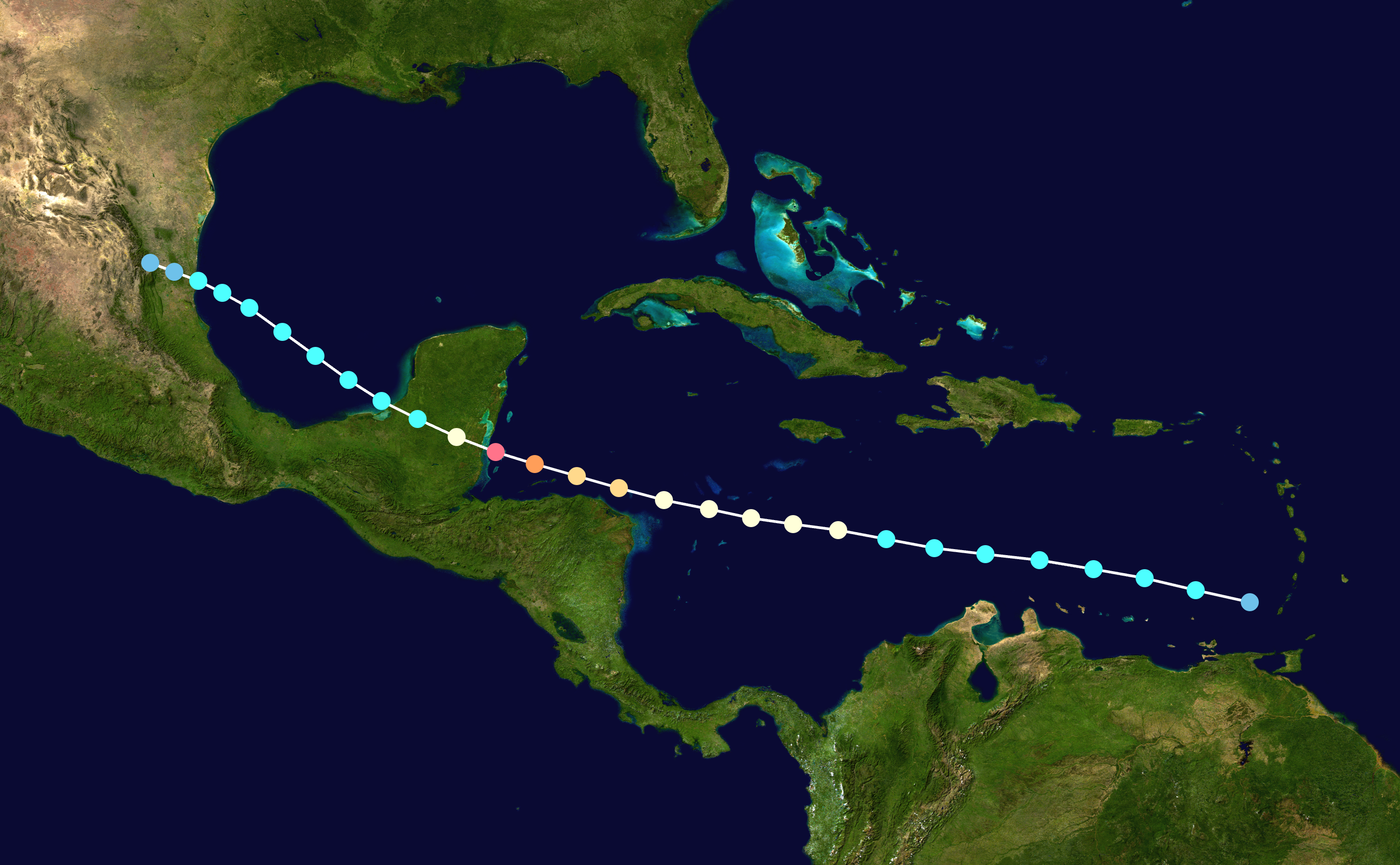
Map plotting the storm's track and intensity, according to the Saffir–Simpson scale Map key Saffir–Simpson scale Tropical depression (≤38 mph, ≤62 km/h) Tropical storm (39–73 mph, 63–118 km/h) Category 1 (74–95 mph, 119–153 km/h) Category 2 (96–110 mph, 154–177 km/h) Category 3 (111–129 mph, 178–208 km/h) Category 4 (130–156 mph, 209–251 km/h) Category 5 (≥157 mph, ≥252 km/h) Unknown Storm type Tropical cyclone Subtropical cyclone Extratropical cyclone, remnant low, tropical disturbance, or monsoon depression

The hurricane began as a tropical wave—a westbound low-pressure area—first observed southeast of Cape Verde on 29 August. Traversing the tropical Atlantic, the wave retained a minimum barometric pressure of about 1010 mbar (hPa; 29.83 inHg) and strengthened briefly the following day. By 1 September, however, the wave had become rather weak and indiscernible; it would remain as such for much of its early existence until 6 September, by which time it had moved past the Windward Islands. In this region the system became sufficiently organised to be classified as a tropical depression at 18:00 UTC that same day near Grenada. Some six hours after its inception the depression strengthened to a tropical storm over the eastern Caribbean Sea. Owing to a lack of ship observations, data on the storm were scarce in that region. The first ship to identify the storm clearly was the tanker Geo H. Jones, which recorded strong winds in conjunction with rapidly decreasing barometric pressures late on 7 September. As the storm remained west-northwest bound across the Caribbean, more ships were able to record data on the cyclone.

It is estimated that at 18:00 UTC on 8 September, the tropical storm attained hurricane intensity. Intensification remained gradual until the hurricane moved into the Gulf of Honduras by 10 September, when the hurricane began to rapidly intensify. At 00:00 UTC on 10 September, the cyclone intensified into a Category 2 hurricane. The storm strengthened further before reaching its peak intensity as a Category 4 hurricane with maximum sustained winds of 130 mph (215 km/h) at 1800 UTC. The strong hurricane made landfall on Belize City at the same intensity two hours later. A barometer in the city recorded a minimum pressure of 952 mbar (hPa; 28.12 mbar); this was the lowest barometric pressure measured in association with the storm. The hurricane substantially weakened over the Yucatán Peninsula, and had weakened to tropical storm strength by the time it had entered the Bay of Campeche. Despite moving back over water, the tropical cyclone continued to weaken in the bay, and made its final landfall roughly 60–70 mi (95–110 km) north of Tampico, Mexico, with winds of 40 mph (65 km/h) at around 00:00 UTC on 13 September. Over the mountainous terrain of Mexico, the storm quickly weakened, and dissipated later on 13 September.

== Preparations, impact, and aftermath ==
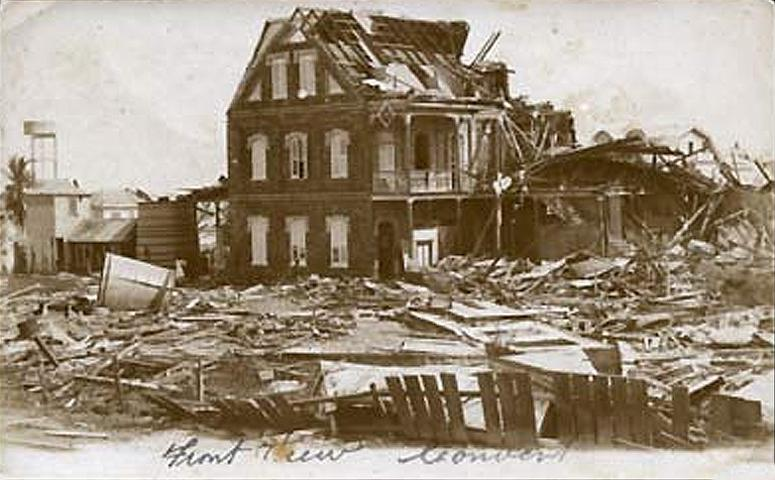
Convent in Belize City after the hurricane

The day of the hurricane, 10 September, is also a national holiday for British Honduras, on which many locals gather in the streets to celebrate the Battle Of St. George's Caye. It is widely believed that the hurricane struck without any warning, although some recent historians have disputed this. In his column for The Belize Times on 5 September 2004, Emory King claimed that Belizean authorities withheld continuous warnings from U.S. ships in the region of a possible hurricane strike on British Honduras so the festivities would not be interrupted. King cited as evidence a letter dated 24 September 1931, from a local radio operator to the Colonial Secretary in which the warnings were discussed, adding that "perhaps none of [the authorities] had ever been in a hurricane and didn't know exactly how bad it was going to be." Additionally, there was also belief among residents of Belize City that the reefs would provide a barrier against large tidal waves.

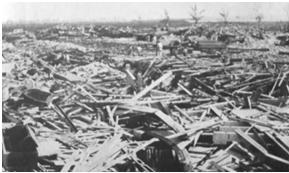
The remains of St. John's College

Storm surge, abnormally high tides, and strong winds resulted in severe damage and many deaths in Belize City. The entire city was inundated with 5 ft (1.5 m) of water. Numerous boats were swept far inland, including a 200-ton dredge. Properties on six streets were completely swept away, while 70% of the city overall was destroyed. The U.S. Embassy building was severely damaged, after water reached the second floor. Giles Russell Taggart, the Consul, suffered injuries after the building collapsed that were ultimately fatal. At St. John's College, several buildings and resident halls were extensively damaged or destroyed. Government radio facilities in Belize City were cut out during the storm. Several American priests in the city were killed during the storm. Within a 25 mi (40 km) radius of Belize City and about 40 mi (64 km) upstream the Belize River, all agricultural plantations were obliterated. Offshore at St. George's Caye, structures were completely destroyed, while 24 deaths occurred there. Overall, damage in the country reached approximately $7.5 million. The storm left approximately 2,500 deaths, making it the deadliest tropical cyclone in the history of Belize.

The British government requested for the United States to send vessels to assist those affected by the storm. A number of residents of Belize City were left without food and water supplies. The USS Swan (AM-34), stationed at nearby Trujillo, Honduras, was dispatched to send aid to British Honduras. United States President Herbert Hoover ordered the United States Navy and American Red Cross to cooperate in relief efforts. Both agencies and organisations ordered a United States Marine Corps plane from Managua, Nicaragua, to send $2,500 worth of medical supplies to affected areas of British Honduras. Throughout the city, relief kitchens were set up. The Government of British Honduras eventually began burning areas with debris and bodies, to prevent spread of disease. Monrad Metzgen, a lieutenant of the British Honduras Defense Force, became responsible for the rescue of persons trapped, feeding those without shelter, and the burial of the deceased. For his efforts, Metzgen received an Order of the British Empire award from King George V of the United Kingdom.

Authorities of Belize City considered abandoning the community and moving it to higher ground. Additionally, there was a proposal to relocate the capital further south or inland to the pine ridge, with either resulting in a higher elevation of the capital. However, the process of moving the capital did not begin until 1961, after Belize City was devastated by Hurricane Hattie. Belmopan became the capital city of British Honduras in 1970.

Due to the weak intensity of the storm and a rural landfall location in Mexico, there were few observations of weather related to the storm in the country. In Tampico, located south of where the storm made landfall, winds reached only 20 mph (32 km/h).

== See also ==
- List of Category 4 Atlantic hurricanes
- Hurricane Hattie (1961)
- Hurricane Greta–Olivia (1978)
- Hurricane Keith (2000)
- Hurricane Iris (2001)
