= List of Category 5 Atlantic hurricanes =

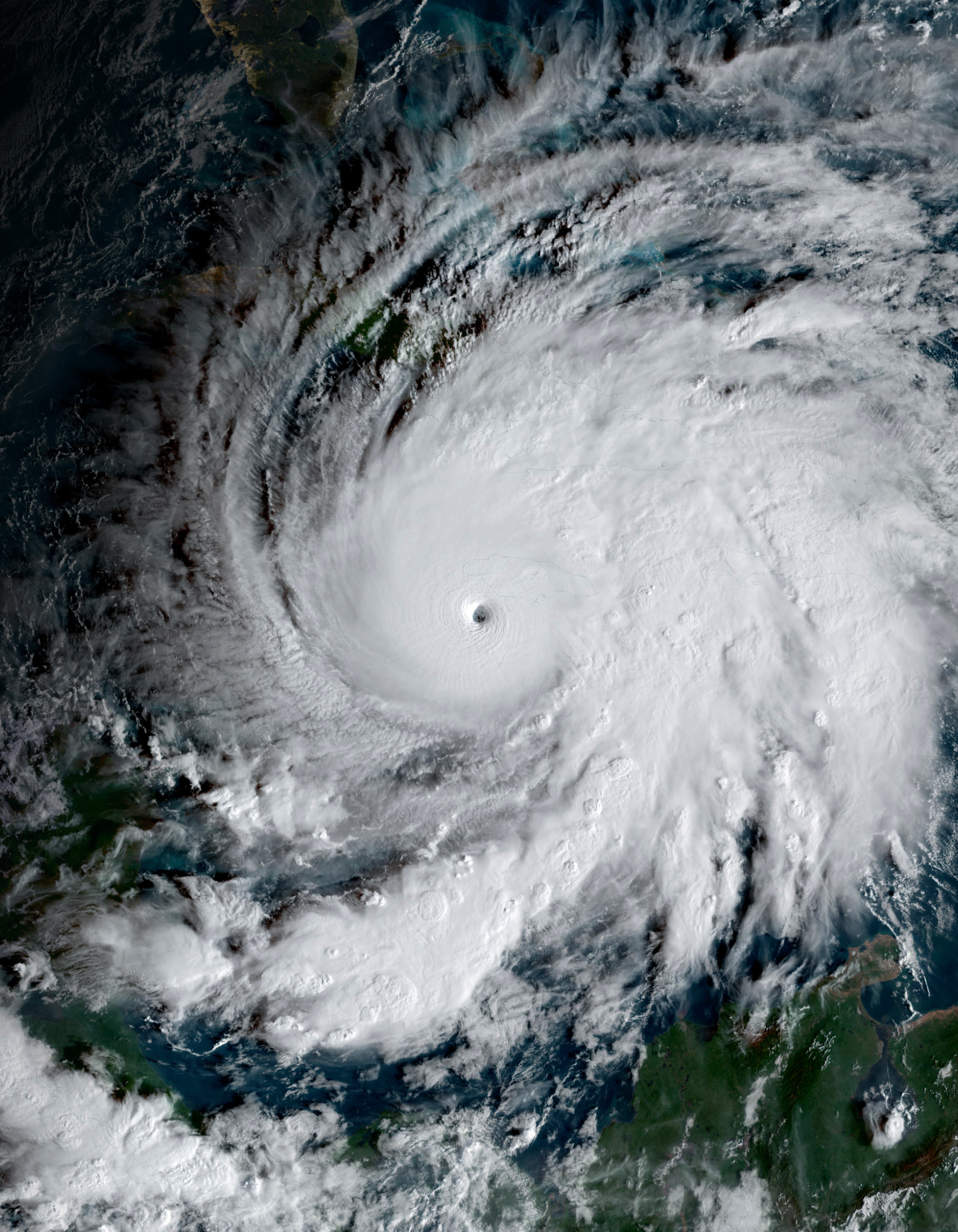
Hurricane Melissa before making landfall on Jamaica on October 28, 2025. It is the most recent hurricane of this strength to form.

A Category 5 Atlantic hurricane is a tropical cyclone that reaches Category 5 intensity on the Saffir–Simpson hurricane wind scale, within the Atlantic Ocean to the north of the equator. They are among the strongest tropical cyclones that can form on Earth, having 1-minute sustained wind speeds of at least 137 knots (254 km/h; 158 mph; 70 m/s). The United States National Hurricane Center (NHC) currently estimates that 11 tropical cyclones between 1851 (the first Atlantic hurricane season to be included in the official Atlantic tropical cyclone record) and 1959 peaked as Category 5 hurricanes. However, because technologies such as satellite monitoring were not available until the 1960s, some cyclones may have remained undetected. Since 1960, 33 Atlantic hurricanes have reached Category 5.

== Background ==
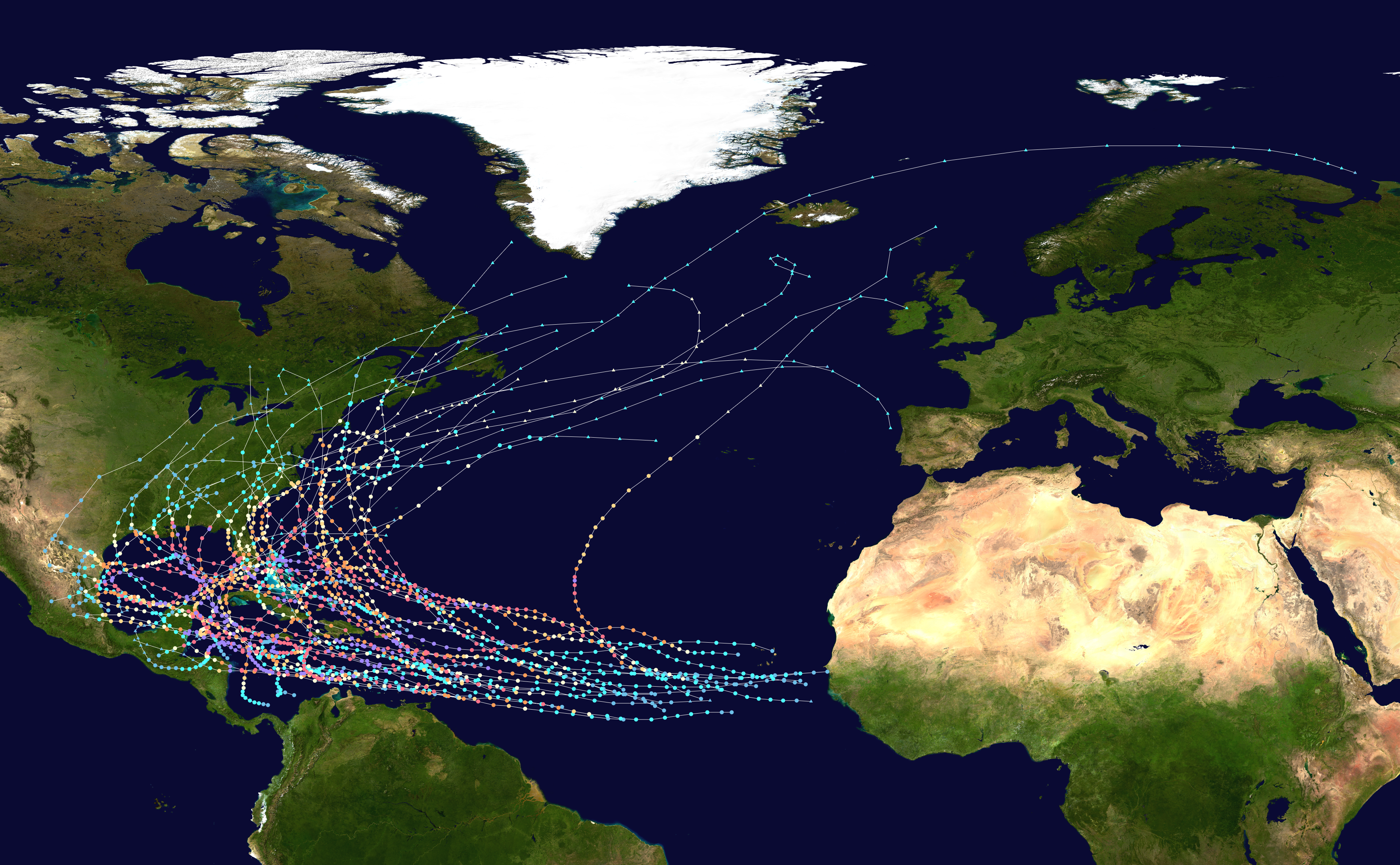
Tracks of all known Category 5 Atlantic hurricanes between 1851 and 2025. This map does not reflect the downgrade of Edith to Category 4.

Within the Atlantic Ocean to the north of the equator, hurricanes are officially monitored by the United States's National Hurricane Center (NHC), however, other meteorological services, such as Météo-France, the United Kingdom's Met Office and Environment Canada also monitor the basin. Within the region, a Category 5 hurricane is a tropical cyclone which reaches Category 5 status on the Saffir–Simpson hurricane wind scale, that is, a tropical cyclone that has 1-minute mean maximum sustained wind speeds of 137 knots (254 km/h; 158 mph; 70 m/s) or greater at 10 metres (32.8 ft) above ground.

No Category 5 hurricanes were observed officially before 1924. It can be presumed that earlier storms reached Category 5 strength over open waters, but the strongest winds were not measured. Although the anemometer, a device used for measuring wind speed, was invented in 1846, during major hurricane strikes, the instruments were often blown away or damaged, leaving the hurricane's peak intensity unrecorded. For example, as the Great Beaufort Hurricane of 1879 struck North Carolina, the anemometer cups were blown away when indicating 138 mph (222 km/h).

As of May 2018, a reanalysis of weather data was ongoing by researchers who may upgrade or downgrade Atlantic hurricanes. For example, the 1825 Santa Ana hurricane is suspected to have reached Category 5 strength. Furthermore, paleotempestological research aims to identify past major hurricanes by comparing sedimentary evidence of recent and past hurricane strikes. For example, a "giant hurricane" significantly more powerful than Hurricane Hattie (Category 5) has been identified in Belizean sediment, having struck the region sometime before 1500.

== Records ==
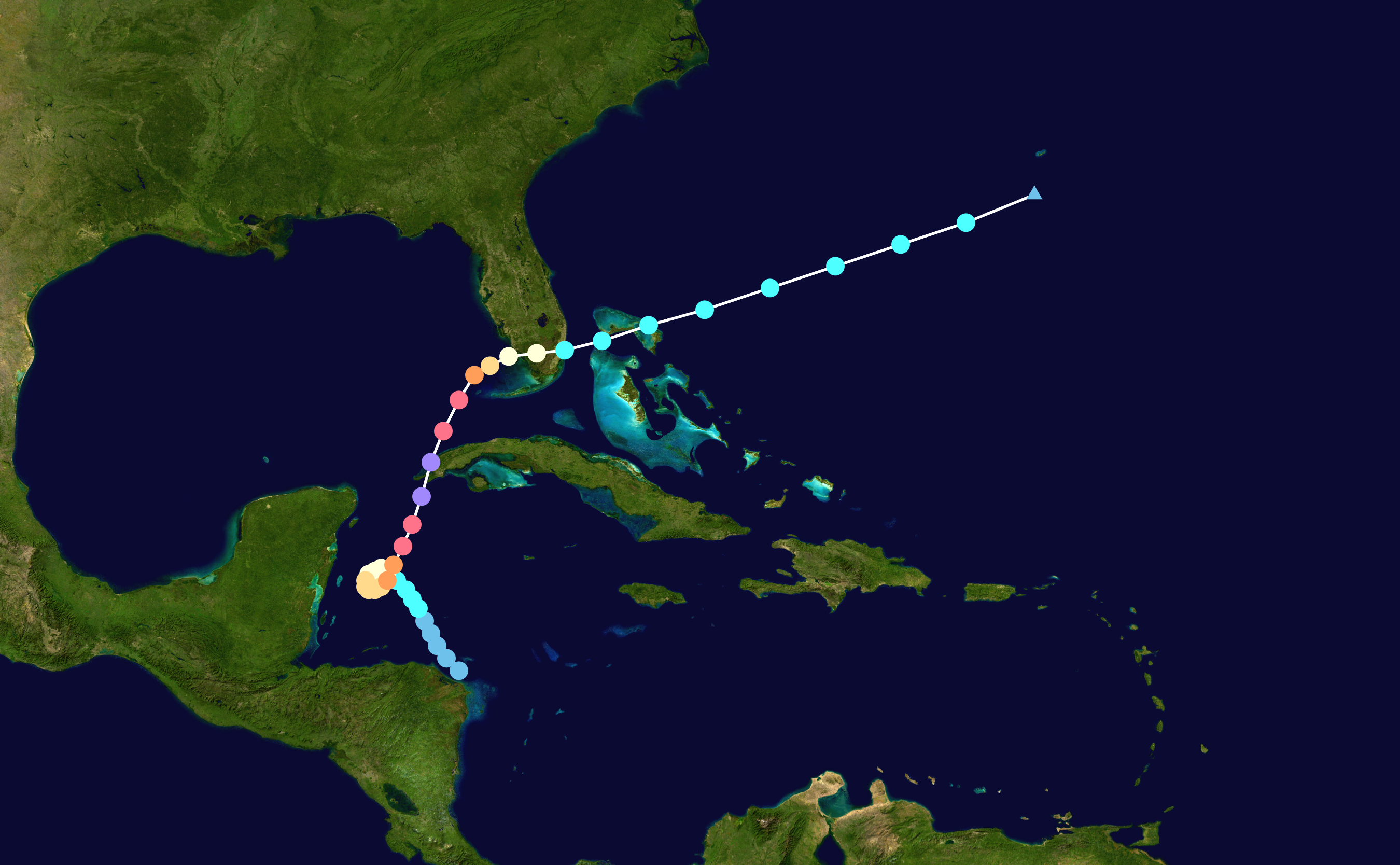
Track of an October Category 5 hurricane that hit Cuba, Florida, and The Bahamas in 1924. It was the first hurricane to be officially recognized as a Category 5 on the modern-day Saffir–Simpson Hurricane Wind Scale.

Officially, the decade with the most Category 5 hurricanes is the 2000s, with eight Category 5 hurricanes having occurred: Isabel (2003), Ivan (2004), Emily (2005), Katrina (2005), Rita (2005), Wilma (2005), Dean (2007), and Felix (2007). The previous decades with the most Category 5 hurricanes were the 1930s and 1960s, with six occurring between 1930 and 1939. The most Category 5 hurricanes recorded in a single season is four, in 2005, followed by 2025, which recorded three. No other seasons had more than two Category 5 hurricanes. The most consecutive years to feature at least one Category 5 hurricane each is four, both from 2016 to 2019 and from 2022 to 2025.

A collage of all Category 5 Atlantic hurricanes since 1980.

Ten Atlantic hurricanes—Camille, Allen, Andrew, Isabel, Ivan, Dean, Felix, Irma, Maria, and Milton—reached Category 5 intensity on more than one occasion; that is, by reaching Category 5 intensity, weakening to a Category 4 status or lower, and then becoming a Category 5 hurricane again. Camille, Andrew, Dean, Felix, Irma, and Maria each attained Category 5 status twice during their lifespans. Allen, Isabel, Ivan, and Milton reached Category 5 intensity on three occasions. The 1932 Cuba hurricane holds the record for the most time spent as a Category 5 hurricane (although it took place before satellite or aircraft reconnaissance, so this record may be somewhat suspect). Irma holds the record for the longest continuous span as a Category 5 storm in the satellite era.

Of the 44 Category 5 Atlantic hurricanes on record, 2 have been recorded in July, 8 in August, 25 in September, 8 in October, and 1 in November. There have been no officially recorded June or off-season Category 5 hurricanes.

July and August Category 5 hurricanes reached their high intensities in either the Gulf of Mexico, Caribbean, or the southwestern Atlantic.

September sees the most Category 5 hurricanes, with over half of the total. This coincides with the climatological peak of the Atlantic hurricane season, which occurs in early September. September Category 5s reached their strengths in any of the Gulf of Mexico, Caribbean, and open Atlantic. These places are where September tropical cyclones are likely to form. Many of these hurricanes are either Cape Verde hurricanes, which develop their strength due to a long track over warm waters, or else intensify over the warm Loop Current in the Gulf of Mexico.

All but two of the Category 5 hurricanes in October and November (the exceptions being Michael and Milton) reached their intensities in the western Caribbean, a region that Atlantic hurricanes strongly gravitate toward late in the season. This is due to the climatology of the area, which sometimes has a high-altitude anticyclone that promotes rapid intensification late in the season, as well as warm waters.

== Systems ==
Name	Category 5 intensity		Peak intensity		Areas affected	Damage (USD)	Deaths	Refs.
Name	Dates	Duration	Wind speed	Pressure	Areas affected	Damage (USD)	Deaths	Refs.
"Cuba"	October 19, 1924	12 hours	165 mph (270 km/h)	910 hPa (26.87 inHg)	Central America, Mexico, Cuba; Florida, The Bahamas		90	
"San Felipe II; Okeechobee"	September 13–14, 1928	12 hours	160 mph (260 km/h)	929 hPa (27.43 inHg)	Lesser Antilles, The Bahamas; United States East Coast, Atlantic Canada	$100 million	4,000	
"Abaco"	September 5–6, 1932	1 day	160 mph (260 km/h)	931 hPa (27.49 inHg)	The Bahamas, Northeastern United States		18	
"Camagüey"	November 5–8, 1932	3 days 6 hours	175 mph (280 km/h)	915 hPa (27.02 inHg)	Lesser Antilles, Jamaica, Cayman Islands; Cuba, The Bahamas, Bermuda	$40 million	3,103	
"Cuba–Brownsville"	August 30, 1933	12 hours	160 mph (260 km/h)	930 hPa (27.46 inHg)	The Bahamas, Cuba, Florida; Texas, Tamaulipas	$27.9 million	179	
"Tampico"	September 21, 1933	12 hours	160 mph (260 km/h)	929 hPa (27.43 inHg)	Jamaica, Yucatán Peninsula	$5 million	184	
"Labor Day"	September 3, 1935	18 hours	185 mph (295 km/h)	892 hPa (26.34 inHg)	The Bahamas, Florida, Georgia; The Carolinas, Virginia		408	
"New England"	September 19–20, 1938	18 hours	160 mph (260 km/h)	940 hPa (27.76 inHg)	Eastern United States, Southwestern Quebec	$306 million	682	
"Great Atlantic"	September 13, 1944	18 hours	160 mph (260 km/h)	918 hPa (27.11 inHg)	Eastern United States, Atlantic Canada	$100 million	300	
Carol	September 3, 1953	12 hours	160 mph (260 km/h)	929 hPa (27.43 inHg)	Bermuda, New England, Atlantic Canada	$2 million	5	
Janet	September 27–28, 1955	18 hours	175 mph (280 km/h)	914 hPa (26.99 inHg)	Lesser Antilles, Central America	$65.8 million	1,023	
Esther	September 17, 1961	18 hours	160 mph (260 km/h)	919 hPa (27.14 inHg)	East Coast of the United States	$6 million	7	
Hattie	October 31, 1961	6 hours	165 mph (270 km/h)	914 hPa (26.99 inHg)	Central America	$60.3 million	319	
Inez	September 28–29, 1966	1 day	160 mph (260 km/h)	927 hPa (27.37 inHg)	Greater Antilles, Florida, Mexico	$229 million	756	
Beulah	September 20, 1967	6 hours	160 mph (260 km/h)	921 hPa (27.20 inHg)	The Caribbean, Mexico, Texas	$208 million	59	
Camille	August 16–17 and 18, 1969	1 day 6 hours (Note: Discontinuous duration (weakened below Category 5, then restrengthened to that classification))	175 mph (280 km/h)	900 hPa (26.58 inHg)	Cuba, United States Gulf Coast	$1.42 billion	259	
Anita	September 2, 1977	12 hours	175 mph (280 km/h)	926 hPa (27.34 inHg)	Mexico	Unknown	11	
David	August 30–31, 1979	1 day 18 hours	175 mph (280 km/h)	924 hPa (27.29 inHg)	The Caribbean, United States East coast	$1.54 billion	2,068	
Allen	August 5–6, 7–8, and 9, 1980	3 days	190 mph (305 km/h)	899 hPa (26.55 inHg)	The Caribbean, Yucatán Peninsula; Mexico, South Texas	$1.57 billion	281	
Gilbert	September 13–14, 1988	1 day	185 mph (295 km/h)	888 hPa (26.22 inHg)	Jamaica, Venezuela, Central America; Hispaniola, Mexico	$2.98 billion	318	
Hugo	September 15, 1989	6 hours	160 mph (260 km/h)	918 hPa (27.11 inHg)	The Caribbean, United States East Coast	$10 billion	107	
Andrew	August 23 and 24, 1992	16 hours	175 mph (280 km/h)	922 hPa (27.23 inHg)	The Bahamas, Florida, United States Gulf Coast	$26.5 billion	65	
Mitch	October 26–28, 1998	1 day 18 hours	180 mph (285 km/h)	905 hPa (26.72 inHg)	Central America, Yucatán Peninsula, South Florida	$6.08 billion	11,374	
Isabel	September 11–12, 13, and 14, 2003	1 day 18 hours	165 mph (270 km/h)	915 hPa (27.02 inHg)	Greater Antilles, Bahamas; Eastern United States, Ontario	$5.37 billion	51	
Ivan	September 9, 11–12, and 13–14, 2004	2 days 12 hours	165 mph (270 km/h)	910 hPa (26.87 inHg)	The Caribbean, Venezuela, United States Gulf Coast	$23.3 billion	124	
Emily	July 16, 2005	6 hours	160 mph (260 km/h)	929 hPa (27.43 inHg)	Windward Islands, Jamaica, Mexico, Texas	$1.01 billion	17	
Katrina	August 28–29, 2005	18 hours	175 mph (280 km/h)	902 hPa (26.64 inHg)	Bahamas, United States Gulf Coast	$125 billion	1,392	
Rita	September 21–22, 2005	1 day	180 mph (285 km/h)	895 hPa (26.43 inHg)	Cuba, United States Gulf Coast	$12 billion	125	
Wilma	October 19, 2005	18 hours	185 mph (295 km/h)	882 hPa (26.05 inHg)	Greater Antilles, Central America, Mexico, Florida	$29.4 billion	87	
Dean	August 18 and 21, 2007	1 day	175 mph (280 km/h)	905 hPa (26.72 inHg)	The Caribbean, Central America	$1.76 billion	45	
Felix	September 3 and 4, 2007	1 day	175 mph (280 km/h)	929 hPa (27.43 inHg)	Nicaragua, Honduras	$720 million	133	
Matthew	October 1, 2016	12 hours	165 mph (270 km/h)	934 hPa (27.58 inHg)	Antilles, Venezuela, Colombia; United States East Coast, Atlantic Canada	$15.1 billion	603	
Irma	September 5–8 and 8–9, 2017	3 days	180 mph (285 km/h)	914 hPa (26.99 inHg)	Cape Verde, The Caribbean, Virgin Islands; Cuba, Florida	$64.8 billion	138	
Maria	September 18–19 and 19–20, 2017	1 day 4 hours 15 minutes	175 mph (280 km/h)	908 hPa (26.81 inHg)	Lesser Antilles, Virgin Islands, Puerto Rico; Dominican Republic, Turks and Caicos Islands	$91.4 billion	3,018	
Michael	October 10, 2018	30 minutes	160 mph (260 km/h)	919 hPa (27.14 inHg)	Central America, United States Gulf Coast	$25.1 billion	74	
Dorian	September 1–2, 2019	1 day 6 hours	185 mph (295 km/h)	910 hPa (26.87 inHg)	The Caribbean, The Bahamas, United States East Coast, Atlantic Canada, Greenland	$5 billion	84	
Lorenzo	September 29, 2019	3 hours	160 mph (260 km/h)	925 hPa (27.32 inHg)	Cabo Verde, Azores, Western Europe	$367 million	20	
Ian	September 28, 2022	6 hours	160 mph (260 km/h)	937 hPa (27.67 inHg)	Caribbean, Cuba, Florida, The Carolinas	$113 billion	160	
Lee	September 8, 2023	6 hours	165 mph (270 km/h)	926 hPa (27.34 inHg)	Bermuda, New England, Atlantic Canada	$80 million	4	
Beryl	July 2, 2024	15 hours	165 mph (270 km/h)	932 hPa (27.52 inHg)	Caribbean, Puerto Rico, Yucatán Peninsula, Texas	$8.3 billion	73	
Milton	October 7–8, 8–9, and 9–10 2024	1 day 2 hours 5 minutes	180 mph (285 km/h)	895 hPa (26.43 inHg)	Yucatán Peninsula, Florida, and The Bahamas	$34.3 billion	45	
Erin	August 16, 2025	6 hours	160 mph (260 km/h)	913 hPa (26.96 inHg)	Cape Verde, Lesser Antillies	>$25 million	13	
Humberto	September 27–28, 2025	12 hours	160 mph (260 km/h)	918 hPa (27.11 inHg)	Bermuda	None	0	
Melissa	October 27–28, 2025	1 day 12 hours	190 mph (305 km/h)	892 hPa (26.34 inHg)	Jamaica, Cuba, Haiti, Bermuda	$8.8 billion	95	

=== Other systems ===
The 1947 Fort Lauderdale hurricane and Hurricanes Dog (1950), Easy (1951), Cleo (1958), Donna (1960), Ethel (1960), Carla (1961) and Edith (1971) were all originally estimated to have Category 5 sustained wind speeds. However, later systematic studies by the Atlantic hurricane reanalysis project found that the wind speeds associated with these systems were overestimated and downgraded them to Category 4 (Category 3 in the case of Ethel). Separately, Hurricane Iota (2020) was operationally considered to be a Category 5 hurricane, with estimated 1-minute sustained wind speeds of 160 mph (260 km/h). However, during their routine post-analysis best track process after the season (rather than the historical reanalysis project), the NHC downgraded Iota to a Category 4 hurricane after determining that there was a high bias in wind speeds derived from the Stepped Frequency Microwave Radiometer instrument.

== Number by month ==
Number of recorded Category 5 Atlantic hurricanes by month
Month	Number of hurricanes
July	2
August	8
September	25
October	8
November	1

== Landfalls ==
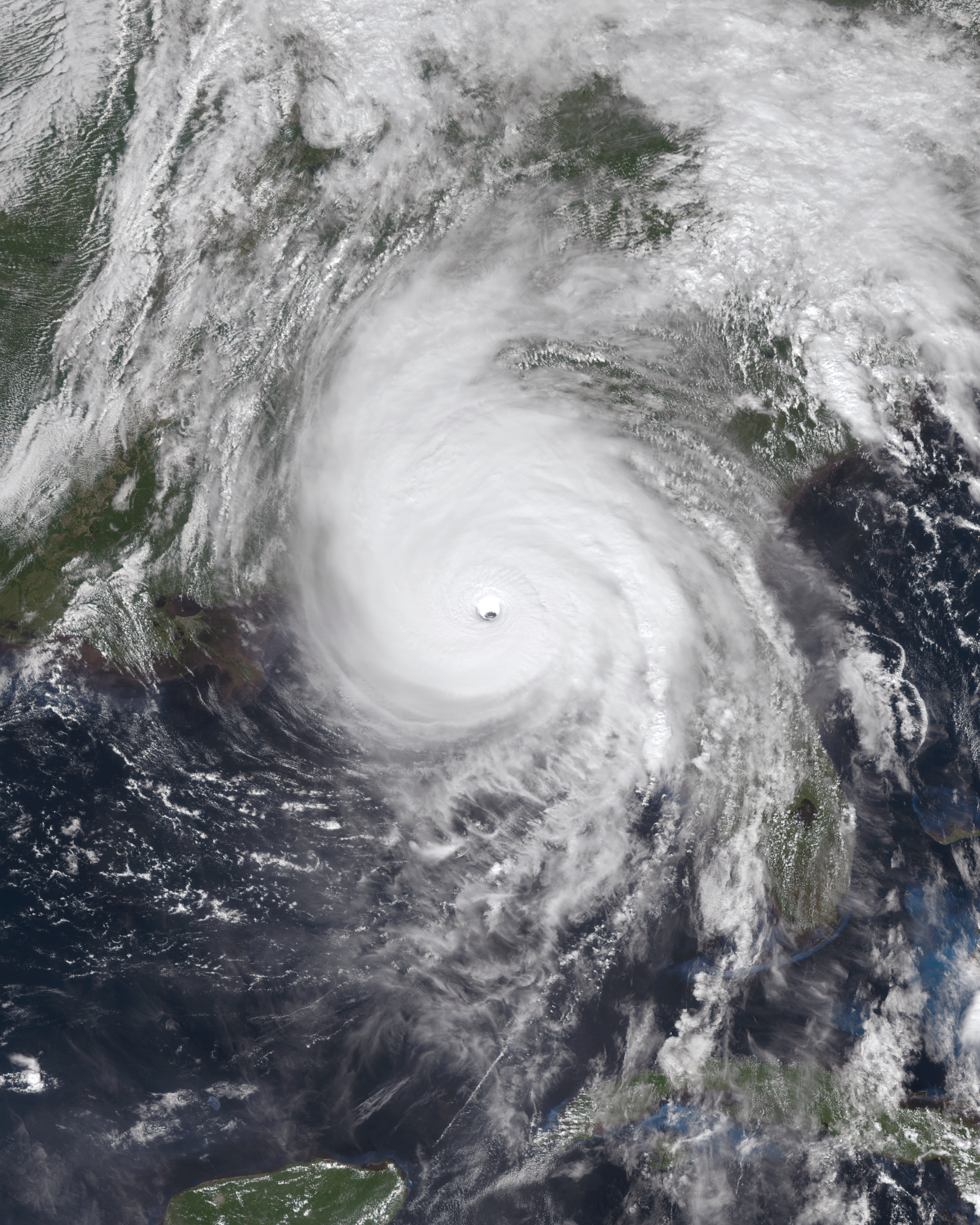
Hurricane Michael as it was making landfall as a Category 5 hurricane in 2018

Nearly all Atlantic Category 5 hurricanes have made landfall at some location while a tropical or subtropical cyclone. This is primarily because of their proximity to land in the Caribbean and Gulf of Mexico, where the usual synoptic weather patterns carry them towards land, as opposed to the westward, oceanic mean track of Eastern Pacific hurricanes. 19 of the storms made landfall at least once while at Category 5 intensity; 2007 and 2017 are the only years in which two storms made landfall at this intensity. All but six landfalling systems (the 1944 Great Atlantic hurricane, Carol, Esther, Mitch, Isabel, and Erin) did so at major hurricane strength.

Many of these systems made landfall shortly after weakening from a Category 5 hurricane. This weakening can be caused by dry air near land, shallower waters due to shelving, interaction with land, eyewall replacement cycles, increased vertical wind shear, or cooler waters near shore.

The only Atlantic Category 5 hurricanes that did not make landfall while a tropical or subtropical cyclone were Hurricane Lorenzo, which still brought hurricane-force winds to the Azores; Hurricane Lee, which still made landfall as an extratropical cyclone in Nova Scotia; and Hurricane Humberto, which still caused increased surf along the East Coast of the United States and minor impacts to Bermuda. These three storms are therefore not included in the table below.

The following table lists these hurricanes by landfall intensity.

Name	Year	Category 5	Category 4	Category 3	Category 2	Category 1	Tropical or subtropical storm	Tropical or subtropical depression	Refs.
"Cuba"	1924	Cuba				Florida	The Bahamas		
"Okeechobee"	1928	Puerto Rico	Guadeloupe, Lucayan Archipelago, Florida			South Carolina			
"Abaco"	1932	The Bahamas							
"Cuba"	1932		Little Cayman, Cuba	The Bahamas			Martinique		
"Cuba–Brownsville"	1933	The Bahamas		Cuba, Texas					
"Tampico"	1933		Yucatán Peninsula		Mainland Mexico				
"Labor Day"	1935	Florida Keys			Northwest Florida	The Bahamas			
"New England"	1938			New York, Connecticut					
"Great Atlantic"	1944				New York, Rhode Island				
Carol	1953					New Brunswick			
Janet	1955	Yucatán Peninsula			Mainland Mexico				
Esther	1961						Massachusetts, Maine		
Hattie	1961		Belize						
Inez	1966	Dominican Republic		Cuba, Haiti, mainland Mexico		Cuba			
Beulah	1967			Mexico					
Camille	1969	Mississippi			Cuba				
Anita	1977	Mainland Mexico							
David	1979	Dominican Republic	Dominica		Florida	Cuba, The Bahamas, Georgia			
Allen	1980			Texas, Barbados					
Gilbert	1988	Quintana Roo	Jamaica	Tamaulipas					
Hugo	1989		Guadeloupe, Saint Croix, South Carolina	Puerto Rico					
Andrew	1992	Eleuthera, Florida	Berry Islands	Louisiana					
Mitch	1998					Honduras	Campeche, Florida		
Isabel	2003				North Carolina				
Ivan	2004			Alabama, Grenada				Louisiana	
Emily	2005		Quintana Roo	Tamaulipas		Grenada			
Katrina	2005			Louisiana, Mississippi		Florida			
Rita	2005			Louisiana					
Wilma	2005		Cozumel, Quintana Roo	Florida					
Dean	2007	Quintana Roo			Veracruz				
Felix	2007	Nicaragua					Grenada		
Matthew	2016		Haiti, Cuba, Grand Bahama			South Carolina			
Irma	2017	Barbuda, Saint Martin, Virgin Gorda, Cuba	Little Inagua, Florida Keys	Southwest Florida					
Maria	2017	Dominica	Puerto Rico						
Michael	2018	Florida							
Dorian	2019	Abaco Islands, Grand Bahama (2×)			North Carolina	St. Thomas	Saint Lucia, Barbados		
Ian	2022		Florida (2x)	Cuba		South Carolina			
Beryl	2024		Carriacou			Quintana Roo, Texas			
Milton	2024			Florida					
Erin	2025						Cabo Verde		
Melissa	2025	Jamaica		Cuba		Long Island, Bahamas, San Salvador Island			

== See also ==
- Atlantic hurricane season
- List of Atlantic hurricanes
- List of Category 4 Atlantic hurricanes
- List of Category 3 Atlantic hurricanes
- List of Category 2 Atlantic hurricanes
- Pacific hurricane season
- List of Pacific hurricanes
- List of Category 5 Pacific hurricanes
- List of Category 4 Pacific hurricanes
- List of Category 3 Pacific hurricanes
