= 1933 Tampico hurricane =

Category 5 Atlantic hurricane in 1933

Hurricane Fourteen 1933 Tampico hurricane
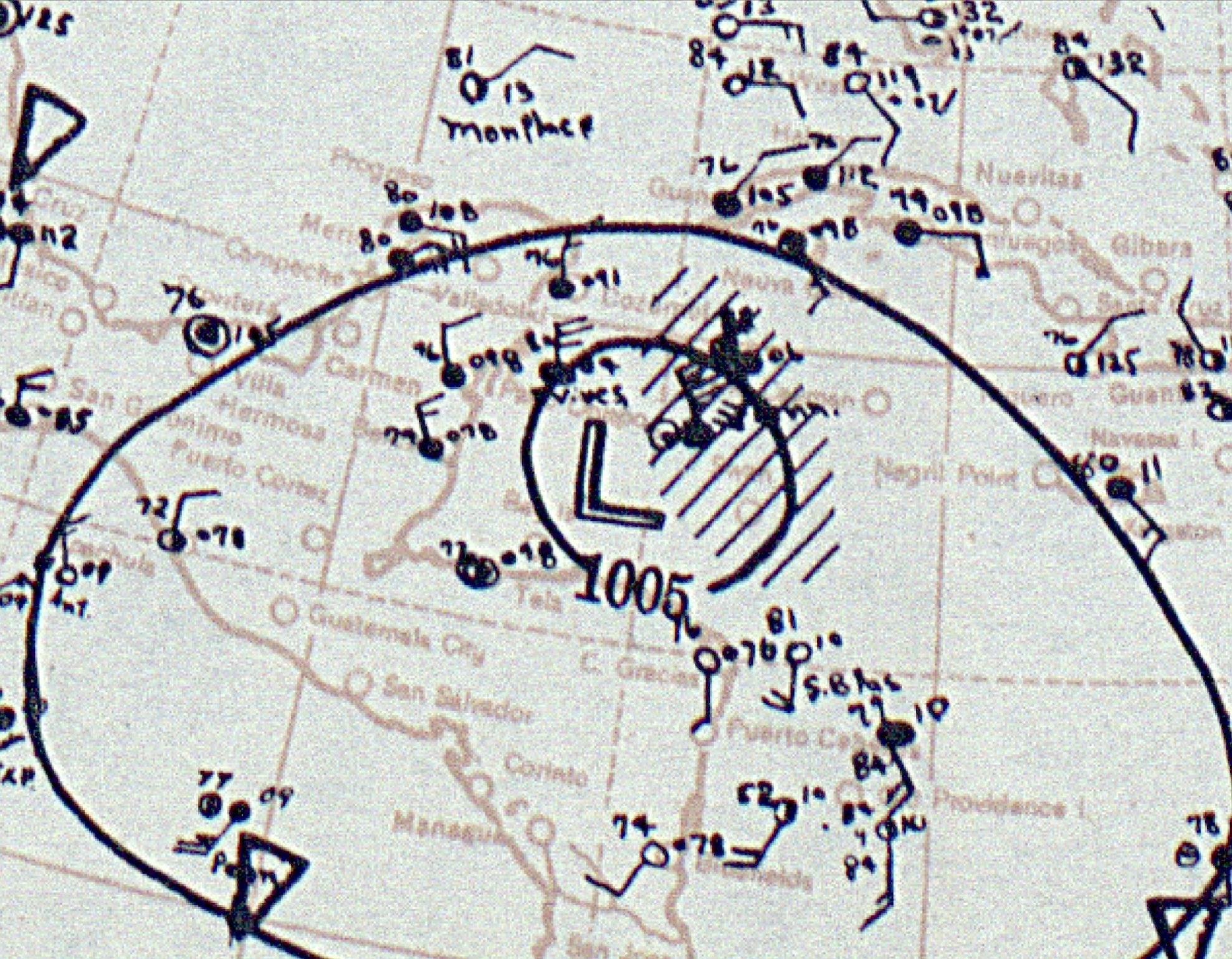
- Surface weather analysis of the hurricane at peak intensity as it approaches the Yucatán Peninsula on September 21

Meteorological history
- Formed: September 16, 1933
- Dissipated: September 25, 1933

Category 5 major hurricane
- 1-minute sustained (SSHWS/NWS)
- Highest winds: 160 mph (260 km/h)
- Lowest pressure: 929 mbar (hPa); 27.43 inHg

Overall effects
- Fatalities: ~184
- Damage: $5 million (1933 USD)
- Areas affected: Jamaica, Yucatán Peninsula, Tamaulipas
- IBTrACS
- Part of the 1933 Atlantic hurricane season

The 1933 Tampico hurricane was a deadly tropical cyclone late in the 1933 Atlantic hurricane season. It was the second system of the season to reach Category 5‑equivalent intensity on the Saffir–Simpson Hurricane Scale. (Note: The Saffir-Simpson hurricane wind scale was developed in 1971, and has been retroactively applied to the entirety of the Atlantic hurricane database.) It developed on September 16 near the Lesser Antilles, and slowly intensified while moving across the Caribbean Sea. Becoming a hurricane on September 19, its strengthening rate increased while passing south of Jamaica. Two days later, the hurricane reached peak winds, estimated at 160 mph (260 km/h). After weakening, it made landfall on the Yucatán Peninsula, destroying several houses. One person was killed offshore Progreso, Yucatán during the storm.

Over land, the hurricane weakened to a tropical storm, although it re-intensified slightly in the Gulf of Mexico. On September 25, it made a second landfall just south of Tampico, Tamaulipas with winds at around 110 mph (180 km/h), and it quickly dissipated over land. Damage was heaviest there, estimated at $5 million (1933 USD) and there were hundreds of deaths. About 75% of the houses in Tampico were damaged, including about 50% of houses that had severe to total destruction to their roofs. The destruction prompted the declaration of martial law, and there was a curfew instated.

== Meteorological history ==
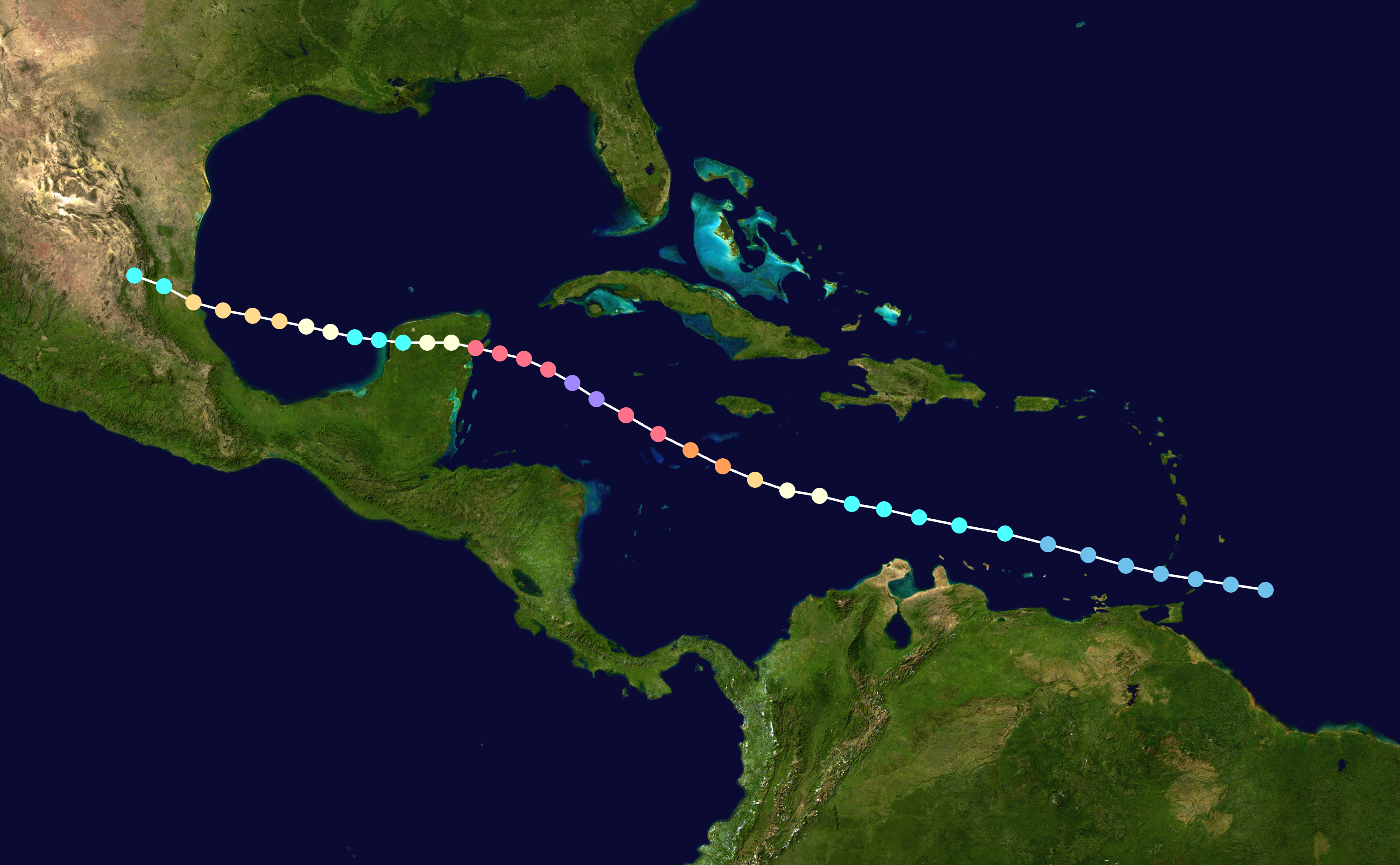
Map plotting the storm's track and intensity, according to the Saffir–Simpson scale Map key Saffir–Simpson scale Tropical depression (≤38 mph, ≤62 km/h) Tropical storm (39–73 mph, 63–118 km/h) Category 1 (74–95 mph, 119–153 km/h) Category 2 (96–110 mph, 154–177 km/h) Category 3 (111–129 mph, 178–208 km/h) Category 4 (130–156 mph, 209–251 km/h) Category 5 (≥157 mph, ≥252 km/h) Unknown Storm type Tropical cyclone Subtropical cyclone Extratropical cyclone, remnant low, tropical disturbance, or monsoon depression

A tropical disturbance moved westward across the tropical Atlantic Ocean in mid-September. On September 16, it was estimated that a tropical depression developed about 185 mi (298 km) east-northeast of Tobago. It moved west-northwestward through the Lesser Antilles, passing about 14 mi (23 km) south of Grenada; however, the system was very weak, and the island reported east winds of only 12 mph (19 km/h). After entering the Caribbean Sea, the depression intensified into a tropical storm on September 18, and a day later it became a hurricane. On September 20 it passed to the south of Jamaica while quickly strengthening. At 0000 UTC on September 21, a ship in the eye reported a barometric pressure of 929 mbar (27.4 inHg). Ordinarily, the pressure reading would suggest winds of 153 mph (246 km/h); however, observations from the ship indicated the hurricane was smaller than normal, with a radius of maximum winds of 8 mi (13 km). As a result, the peak winds were estimated at 160 mph (260 km/h), or a Category 5 on the Saffir-Simpson Hurricane Scale.

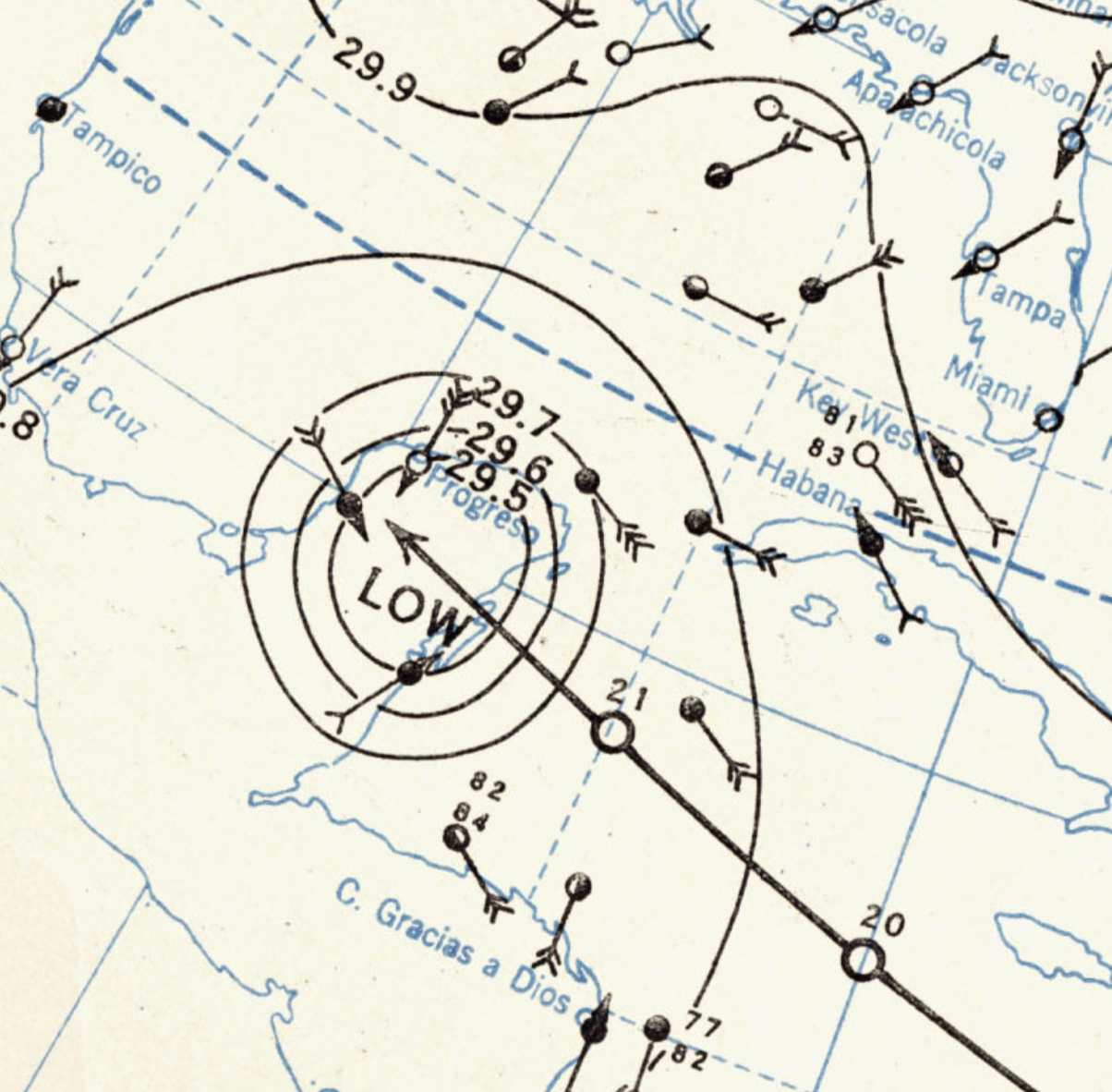
Surface weather analysis showing the hurricane shortly after landfall in the Yucatán Peninsula on September 22

After peaking in intensity, the hurricane continued to the northwest. Early on September 22, it passed about 50 mi (80 km) (Note: The 1933 Monthly Weather Review reported that the hurricane passed "about 40 miles south of Cozumel Island", and the 2012 Atlantic hurricane reanalysis wrote that the "center passed about 10 nmi farther south of Cozumel than previously analyzed".) south of Cozumel before making landfall on the Yucatán Peninsula. Its landfall intensity was unknown; the Atlantic hurricane reanalysis in 2012 suggested that the storm could have retained Category 5 status until landfall, although local observations did not validate the theory. In the original analysis of the season, the landfall intensity was estimated at 105 mph (169 km/h). As a compromise, the 2012 reanalysis estimated the hurricane struck land with winds of 140 mph (230 km/h). The cyclone rapidly weakened while crossing the Yucatán peninsula, and on September 23 it emerged into the Gulf of Mexico with winds of 65 mph (105 km/h). It quickly reintensified into a hurricane while moving toward the northeast Mexican coastline. At around 0000 UTC on September 25, the hurricane made its final landfall just south of Tampico, Tamaulipas with winds of 110 mph (180 km/h); this was based on a ship in the eye reporting a pressure of 960 mbar (28 inHg). Within 12 hours, the storm dissipated over land.

== Impact ==
While passing south of Jamaica, the hurricane produced high surf in Kingston. Heavy rains from the storm affected much of the island, which disrupted travel and caused one mudslide. In Cozumel offshore the Yucatán Peninsula, winds reached 76 mph (122 km/h) from the southeast. There, the hurricane destroyed a fishing pier and several houses. While the storm crossed the peninsula, Progreso, Yucatán reported east winds of 55 mph (89 km/h). Offshore Progreso, the storm capsized a boat, killing one person.

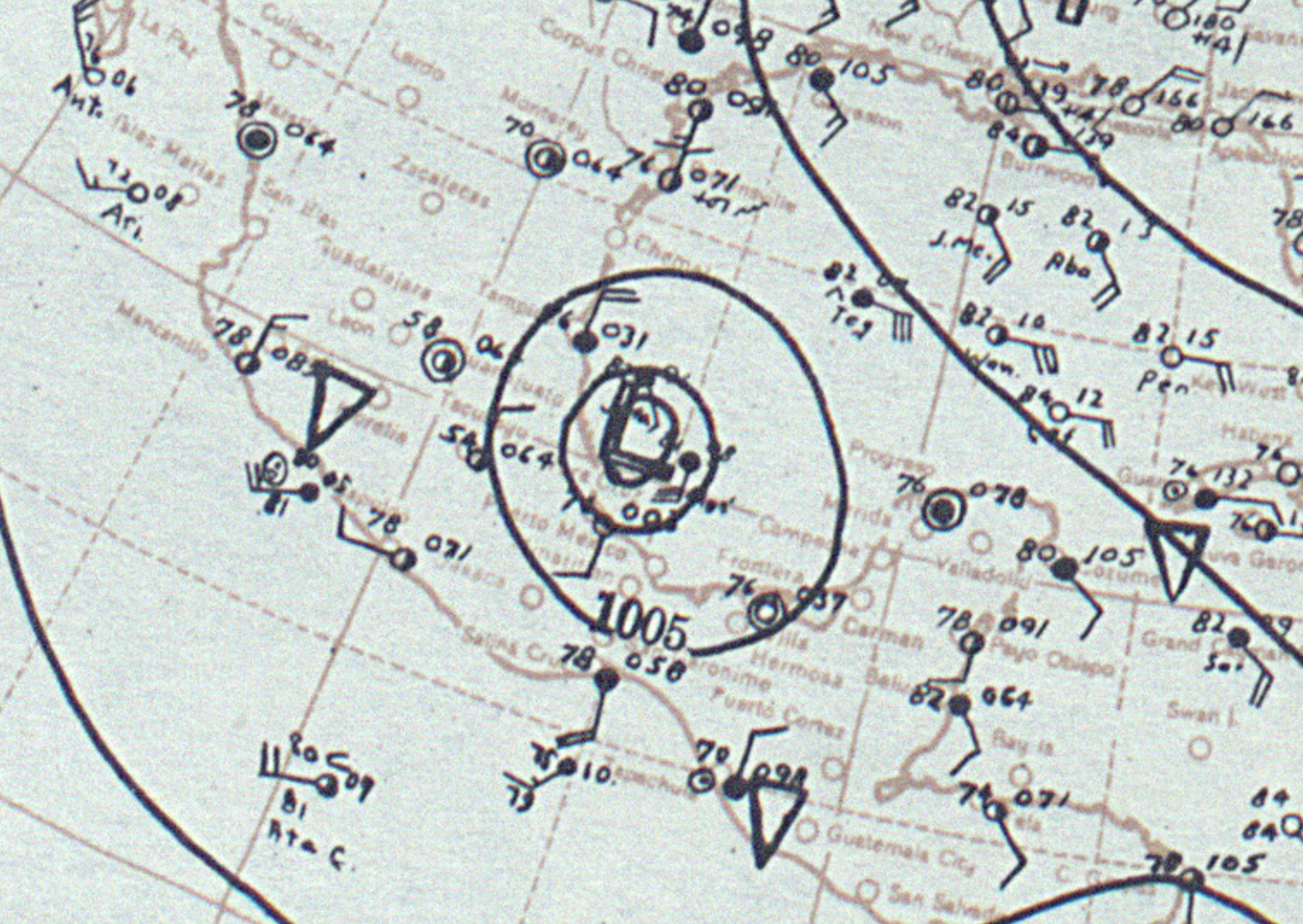
Synoptic weather map of the hurricane approaching landfall in Mexico, near Tampico on September 24

Before the hurricane made its final landfall, the threat of heavy rainfall prompted evacuations around Tampico, just 10 days after another hurricane hit the same region. Near Tampico, a ship reported winds of 81 mph (130 km/h), and a station in Tampico recorded winds of 53 mph (85 km/h). High winds cut power lines and blew off or heavily damaged the roofs of half of the city's houses. A high accompanying storm surge washed away many people from their homes, and several barges were washed away. The harbor was filled with debris after the storm, rendering it unusable. Portions of the city were flooded up to 15 ft (4.6 m) deep. According to news reports, the hurricane damaged about 75% of Tampico. Majority of the damage was to poorly constructed houses, although a large hospital in Tampico was also destroyed, killing 87 people. Roads were blocked throughout the city, and the river was closed to boating. The rail line was impacted, which disrupted relief supplies from reaching the region. Outside of the city, the hurricane increased levels along the Pánuco and Tamesí rivers, which remained above flood stage for several days. West of Tampico, the hurricane flooded the entire city of Cárdenas, San Luis Potosí, killing 20 and injuring 200 people. In Pánuco, Veracruz, about 5,000 people were left homeless. In San Luis Potosí state, 30 people were killed when a dam burst. Heavy rainfall in Monterrey caused rivers to flood. Damage spread as far as the west coast of Mexico. Throughout the country, air travel was disrupted, and several train lines were washed out, leaving three trains missing.

Initial news reports suggested a death toll of up to 5,000 people, and the storm was considered "the greatest disaster in recent Mexican history". Two days after the storm dissipated, the death toll was set at 54, with 850 people injured and potentially thousands that were buried. Search and rescue teams dug through the debris of the Tampico to find survivors and victims. In 1997, the National Hurricane Center listed the death toll between 184–200, and damage was estimated at $5 million (1933 USD).

In the aftermath of the storm, food and medical supplies rapidly diminished. After the storm dissipated, doctors and nurses traveled to the city to assist in the aftermath, while trains carried food and water. A train from Monterrey to Tampico carried food, medicine, and soldiers to assist in rebuilding, but was delayed by ongoing flooding. Military planes were utilized to transport aid. Martial law was declared in Tampico following the storm, and officials imposed a 7 p.m. curfew. Uninjured citizens helped clear the roads. President Abelardo L. Rodríguez asked the governors of the Mexican states to send aid and for residents to send money to the Bank of Mexico. Following the storm, residents overcrowded the buildings that remained standing in Tampico.

== See also ==
- List of Category 5 Atlantic hurricanes
- Hurricane Gilbert (1988) – A destructive Category 5 hurricane that took a similar track
- Hurricane Emily (2005) – Another destructive Category 5 hurricane that took a similar track
- Hurricane Dean (2007) – Another destructive Category 5 hurricane that took a similar track
