= List of storms named Esther =

The name Esther has been used for four tropical cyclones worldwide.

In the Atlantic:

- Tropical Storm Esther (1957)
- Hurricane Esther (1961)

In the Australian basin:

- Cyclone Esther (1983)
- Cyclone Esther (2020)
