= Hurricane Esther =

Category 5 Atlantic hurricane in 1961

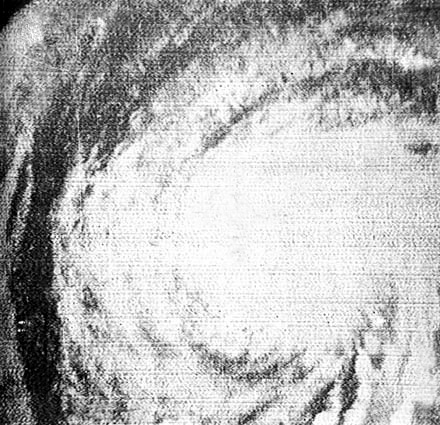
- Satellite image of Hurricane Esther

Meteorological history
- Formed: September 10, 1961
- Dissipated: September 27, 1961

Category 5 major hurricane
- 1-minute sustained (SSHWS/NWS)
- Highest winds: 160 mph (260 km/h)
- Lowest pressure: 919 mbar (hPa); 27.14 inHg

Overall effects
- Fatalities: 7 indirect
- Damage: $6 million (1961 USD)
- Areas affected: East Coast of the United States, New England
- IBTrACS
- Part of the 1961 Atlantic hurricane season

Hurricane Esther was the first large tropical cyclone to be captured by satellite imagery. The fifth tropical cyclone, named storm, and hurricane of the 1961 Atlantic hurricane season, Esther developed from an area of disturbed weather hundreds of miles west-southwest of the southernmost Cape Verde Islands on September 10. Moving northwestward, the depression strengthened into Tropical Storm Esther on September 11, before reaching hurricane intensity on the following day. Early on September 13, Esther curved westward and deepened into a major hurricane. The storm remained a Category 3 hurricane for about four days and gradually moved in a west-northwestward direction. Late on September 17, Esther strengthened into a Category 5 hurricane, peaking with sustained winds of 160 mph (260 km/h) and a minimum pressure of 919 mbar (91.9 kPa; 27.1 inHg) on September 18. The storm curved north-northeastward on September 19, while offshore of North Carolina. Esther began to weaken while approaching New England and fell to Category 3 intensity on September 21. The storm turned eastward early on the following day, and rapidly weakened to a tropical storm.

Esther then executed a large loop, until curving northward on September 25. Early on the following day, Esther made landfall on Cape Cod, hours before emerging into the Gulf of Maine. Later on September 26, the storm made landfall in southeastern Maine, before weakening to a tropical depression and transitioning to an extratropical cyclone over southeastern Quebec. The cyclone persisted for about 12 hours, before dissipating early on September 27. Between North Carolina and New Jersey, effects were primarily limited to strong winds and minor beach erosion and coastal flooding due to storm surge. In New York, strong winds led to severe crop losses and over 300,000 power outages. High tides caused coastal flooding and damage to a number of pleasure boats. Similar impact was reported in Massachusetts. Additionally, some areas observed more than 8 inches (203 mm) of rainfall, flooding basements, low-lying roads, and underpasses. Overall, damages totaled about $6 million (1961 USD). There were also seven deaths reported when a United States Navy P5M aircraft crashed about 120 miles (190 km) north of Bermuda.

== Meteorological history ==
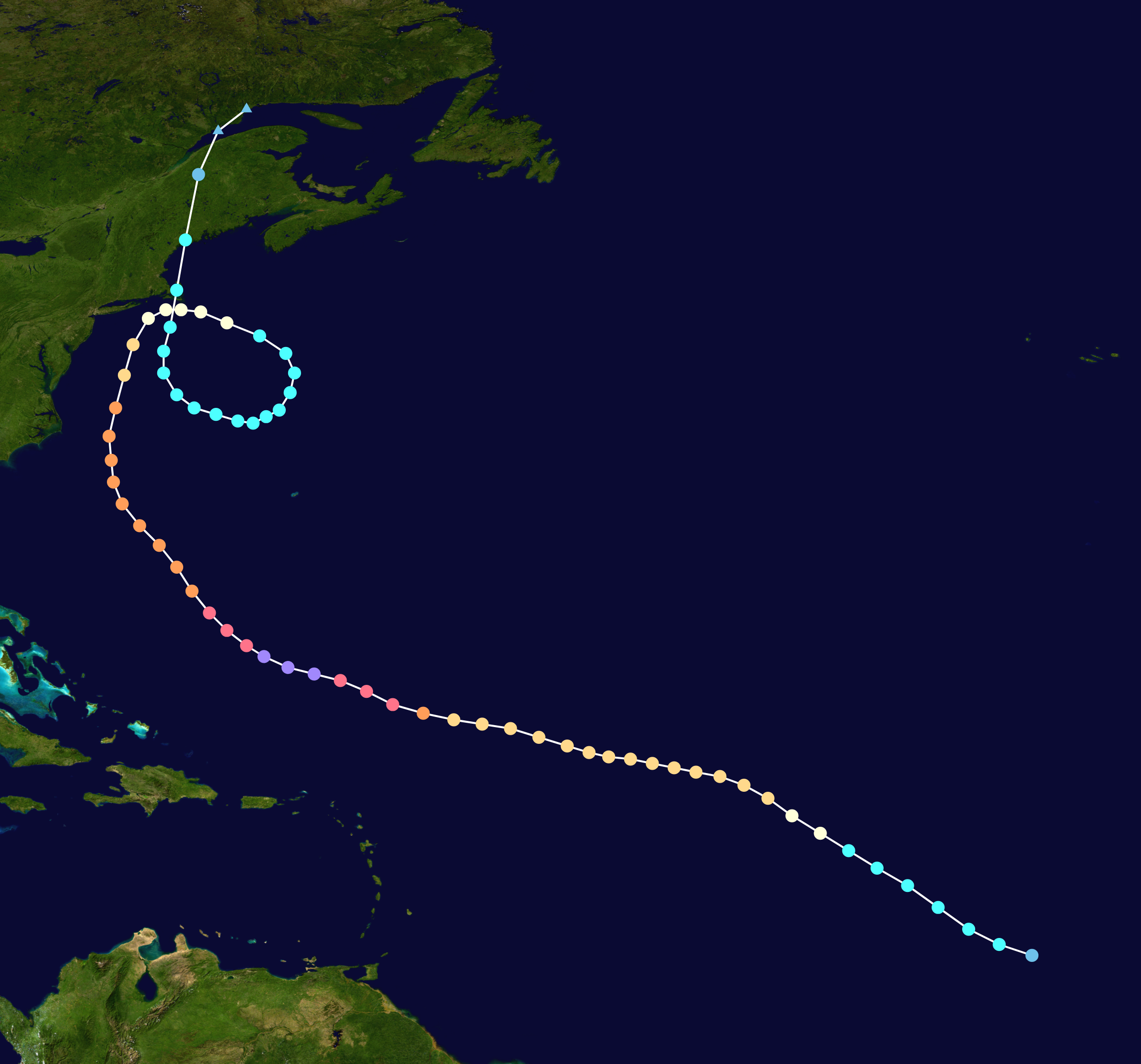
Map plotting the storm's track and intensity, according to the Saffir–Simpson scale Map key Saffir–Simpson scale Tropical depression (≤38 mph, ≤62 km/h) Tropical storm (39–73 mph, 63–118 km/h) Category 1 (74–95 mph, 119–153 km/h) Category 2 (96–110 mph, 154–177 km/h) Category 3 (111–129 mph, 178–208 km/h) Category 4 (130–156 mph, 209–251 km/h) Category 5 (≥157 mph, ≥252 km/h) Unknown Storm type Tropical cyclone Subtropical cyclone Extratropical cyclone, remnant low, tropical disturbance, or monsoon depression

On September 10, the Television Infrared Observation Satellite observed an area of convection, or thunderstorms, to the southwest of the Cape Verde islands, suggesting the possibility of tropical cyclogenesis. At 18:00 UTC that day, a tropical depression formed and subsequently moved on a northwest trajectory. By the time the Hurricane Hunters reached the system on September 12, winds of hurricane force were recorded, and as such, the San Juan, Puerto Rico Weather Bureau began issuing warnings on Hurricane Esther. It was later estimated that the system attained tropical storm status on September 11, although the National Hurricane Center later noted that it could have attained hurricane status by this date, thus potentially being one of four simultaneous hurricanes, along with hurricanes Betsy, Carla, and Debbie. The only other such occasions were in 1893 and 1998. This also made Esther the first hurricane to be discovered by satellite imagery, although not the first to be imaged by one.

After becoming a hurricane, Esther turned more to the west-northwest, influenced by the strengthening Bermuda High that built behind Hurricane Debbie well to the north. By September 13, the storm attained major hurricane status, which is a Category 3 on the current-day Saffir-Simpson scale with sustained winds of 115 mph (185 km/h). By that time, the gale force winds extended about 230 mi (370 km) from the center, with hurricane-force winds spreading 135 mi (217 km) to the north. After maintaining winds of 125 mph (201 km/h) for about two days, Esther weakened slightly on September 16 while passing well north of the Lesser Antilles. On the next day, the hurricane passed about 375 mi (604 km) north of Puerto Rico. Late on September 17, the barometric pressure fell to 927 mbar (92.7 kPa; 27.4 inHg) in the center of Esther, and operationally the Hurricane Hunters estimated winds of 150 mph (240 km/h). This was later lowered slightly to 145 mph (233 km/h), which would be its peak intensity attained on September 18, making it a Category 4 hurricane. However, reanalysis as part of the Atlantic hurricane reanalysis project concluded that Esther was in fact a Category 5 hurricane with winds of 160 mph (260 km/h) and a minimum pressure of 919 mbar (91.9 kPa; 27.1 inHg); this has now been officially incorporated into HURDAT.

Around the time of attaining peak winds, Esther began moving more to the northwest toward the east coast of the United States, influenced by a dissipating cold front that exited the coast on September 15. On September 20, the hurricane passed about 120 mi (193 km) east of Cape Hatteras while turning to the north-northeast while gradually weakening. It continued up the coastline, later passing about 150 mi (241 km) east of the Delmarva Peninsula. Another trough from the west steered Esther to the northeast and was expected to cause the storm to accelerate, potentially bringing it over Cape Cod. While turning, the hurricane passed about 110 mi (177 km) south of the eastern tip of Long Island, 35 mi (56 km) southeast of Block Island, and just 27 mi (43 km) south of Nantucket Island, while a Category 1 hurricane at the time. After the trough bypassed the hurricane, Esther slowed and turned to the east - away from land and over much cooler waters. It weakened to tropical storm status on September 22, and on that day the Weather Bureau discontinued advisories, remarking that Esther no longer had tropical characteristics.

As a weakened tropical storm, Esther turned to the southeast and gradually executed a large loop. On September 24, it turned back to the west and subsequently turned back to the north, influenced by another approaching trough. Warmer waters allowed the storm to re-intensify slightly. As a result, the Boston Weather Bureau reissued advisories on the storm on September 25 while Esther was 275 mi (443 km) south of Nantucket. The storm crossed over eastern Cape Cod while gradually weakening, making a final landfall near Rockland, Maine, on September 26. After crossing into Canada, Esther became extratropical early on September 27 while continuing to the east-northeast. It was last noted at 06:00 UTC that day while over eastern Quebec.

== Preparations ==
While Esther was becoming a powerful hurricane over the open Atlantic, the San Juan Weather Bureau office issued a small craft advisory for the Leeward Islands, United States Virgin Islands, Puerto Rico, Hispaniola, the Bahamas, and Bermuda. Because of uncertainty about the storm's future path, the Weather Bureau advised residents along the east coast of the United States to closely follow the storm. The agency later issued a hurricane watch from Myrtle Beach, South Carolina to Norfolk, Virginia on September 18.

In Norfolk, Virginia, between 10,000 and 15,000 people were evacuated to emergency shelters on September 19, but were able to return home the next day as Esther passed far to the east. Preparations for Esther were described by the National Weather Service's Norfolk bureau as "the most thorough ever seen here" at the time. Naval ships and aircraft carriers based in the city headed for open waters to endure the storm, while over 200 military airplanes were flown inland away from the coast.

The National Weather Service, in anticipation of a possible landfall in the Carolinas, issued a gale warning and a hurricane watch from Myrtle Beach, South Carolina to Norfolk, Virginia on September 18 (tropical storm warnings were not issued at the time). A hurricane warning was issued from Cherry Point, North Carolina to the Virginia capes on September 19, but was discontinued early on September 20 as the hurricane passed to the east. A hurricane watch was also issued from Cape May, New Jersey to the Massachusetts coast on September 19, and like the warning, was discontinued on September 20.

As Esther began to parallel the coastline, a hurricane warning was issued for coastal areas from Long Island to Provincetown, Massachusetts on September 20, and were extended to Eastport, Maine early on September 21. All hurricane watches were discontinued on September 21 as Esther moved away from the New England coast, and all hurricane warnings were downgraded to gale warnings later that day as Esther passed near Nantucket and weakened to a tropical storm, and all warnings were discontinued on September 22 after the storm moved away from the coast. After Esther completed its anticyclonic loop over the northwestern Atlantic, a gale warning was again issued from Provincetown, Massachusetts to Eastport, Maine on September 25, and was discontinued the next day after Esther made its second landfall in Maine. Personnel on two offshore surveillance stations called the Texas Towers were evacuated; a third tower had collapsed during a storm in January 1961, prompting higher safety standards.

== Impact and aftermath ==
A powerful hurricane, Esther produced high waves and strong swells across much of the western Atlantic, including along the north coast of Puerto Rico, the Virgin Islands, and the Bahamas.

=== North Carolina and Virginia ===
In North Carolina, the outer edges of Esther brought sustained winds of 35 mph (56 km/h) with gusts up to 60 mph (97 km/h). A storm surge of 6 ft (1.8 m) was reported in Wilmington, North Carolina. The storm surge caused minor flooding and beach erosion in the Outer Banks, where road damage was extensive. Damage to property, however, was minimal, and the storm's effects in the Wilmington area were compared to those of "a good nor'easter" by the local weather bureau. Southeastern Virginia experienced tides 2 to 4 ft (0.6 to 1.2 m) above normal, which flooded some coastal highways in the Hampton Roads area. There was minor beach erosion in the Norfolk area due to turbulent seas.

=== Mid-Atlantic ===
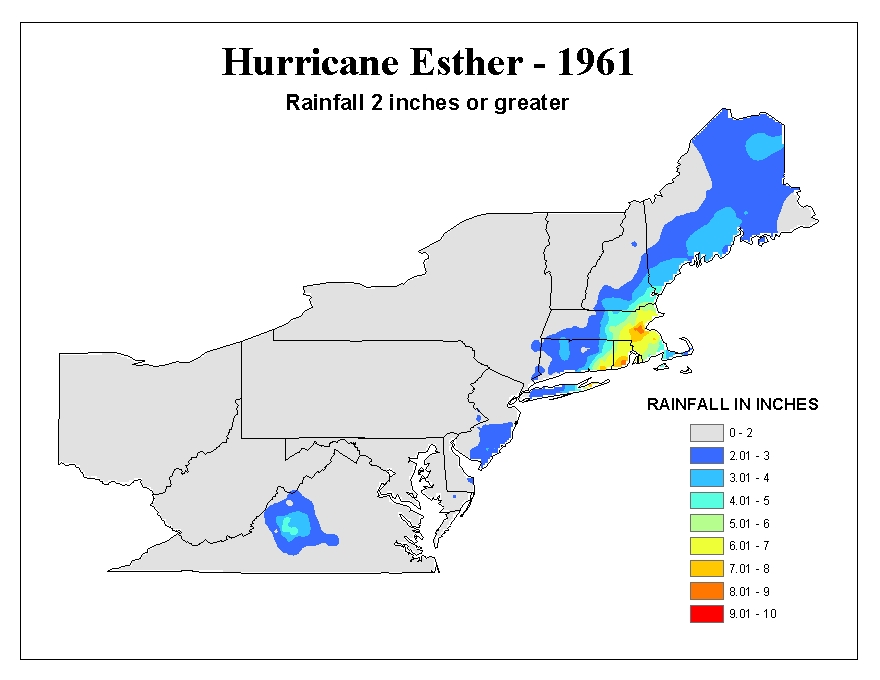
Rainfall totals from Hurricane Esther

Esther mainly produced heavy rainfall and gale-force wind gusts along the coasts of Maryland and Delaware. These areas also experienced storm surges of 6–7 ft (1.8–2.1 m) above normal. Wind gusts to 45 mph (72 km/h) were observed at Ocean City, Maryland, and storm surge flooding caused damage to the city's sea wall and boardwalk. Minor to moderate damage was reported along the New Jersey coast. A wind gust of 69 mph (111 km/h) was observed in Atlantic City. Winds downed trees and power lines and damaged apple crops. Storm surge resulted in minor beach erosion and wrecked some boats. Damage totaled less than $1 million.

In New York, sustained winds of 40 mph (64 km/h) and gusts up to 60 mph (97 km/h) in Putnam and Rockland counties downed numerous trees, caused power outages, and damaged crops. Farther south on Long Island, the hardest hit areas were Nassau and eastern Suffolk counties. Wind gusts up to 108 mph (174 km/h) felled trees and power lines, leaving over 300,000 homes without electricity; minor structure damage was also reported. Downed power lines and minor flooding due to rainfall amounts of up to 7 in (178 mm) also caused public transportation delays on Long Island. Tides as high as 35 ft (10.7 m) damaged many pleasure boats. Minor flooding was reported in Queens and Brooklyn. Damage likely exceeded $3 million, with nearly one-third of that amount incurred to crops and property each.

=== New England ===
In Connecticut, sustained winds between 35 and 50 mph (56 and 80 km/h) and gusts between 45 and 65 mph (72 and 105 km/h) caused electrical and phone service outages, as well as generally minor property damage. There was also some loss to crops, especially apples and corn. Similar impact was reported farther east in Rhode Island, though winds were much stronger, with sustained winds of 74 mph (119 km/h) and a gust up to 83 mph (134 km/h) observed at Block Island. Tides ranging from 4 to 6 ft (1.2 to 1.8 m) above normal damaged small crafts and caused severe beach erosion, destroying a parking lot and washing out several roads. In south-central and northeastern Maine, precipitation totals between 2 and 4 in (51 and 102 mm) flooded basements, underpasses, and low-lying roads, resulting in traffic being delayed by detours.

Strong winds were also observed in eastern Massachusetts, with the strongest wind gust being 70 mph (110 km/h) in Chatham.

Despite gale and storm force wind gusts in eastern Massachusetts and southern New Hampshire, damage was minimal and consisted mainly of downed trees and isolated power outages. Rainfall totals ranged from 1 inch (25 mm) in southern Maine to around 6 inches (152 mm) in the Boston area. The storm separated Smith's Point from the rest of Nantucket Island, creating what came to be known as Esther's Island (which has since re-connected in 1988, re-separated, and re-connected again in 2009). In all, Esther caused an estimated $6 million (1961 USD) in damage.

=== Navy plane crash ===
While over open waters, Esther caused seven indirect deaths when a United States Navy P5M aircraft crashed about 120 miles (193 km) north of Bermuda. A merchant ship, the African Pilot, was in the area where the plane crashed when the captain of the ship received a message from the Bermuda Coast Guard that "We have aircraft in trouble in that vicinity..." The captain of the African Pilot diverted the ship in order to assist the Coast Guard's search for the lost plane. The heavy seas brought by Esther made search-and-rescue efforts difficult. In the end, only three of the ten crewmen were rescued; the other seven were declared lost at sea.

The survivors told Coast Guard officials that during the storm, one of the engines of the plane failed, along with most of the electrical power; as a result, the crew was unable to drop the reserve tank or close the bomb bay doors automatically. Before the crew could close the bomb bay doors manually, the plane crashed in shark-infested waters and broke apart; three of the crewmen were able to get out of the downed plane, but the other seven were unable to escape. The three survivors were then attacked by sharks before being rescued.

== Project Stormfury ==
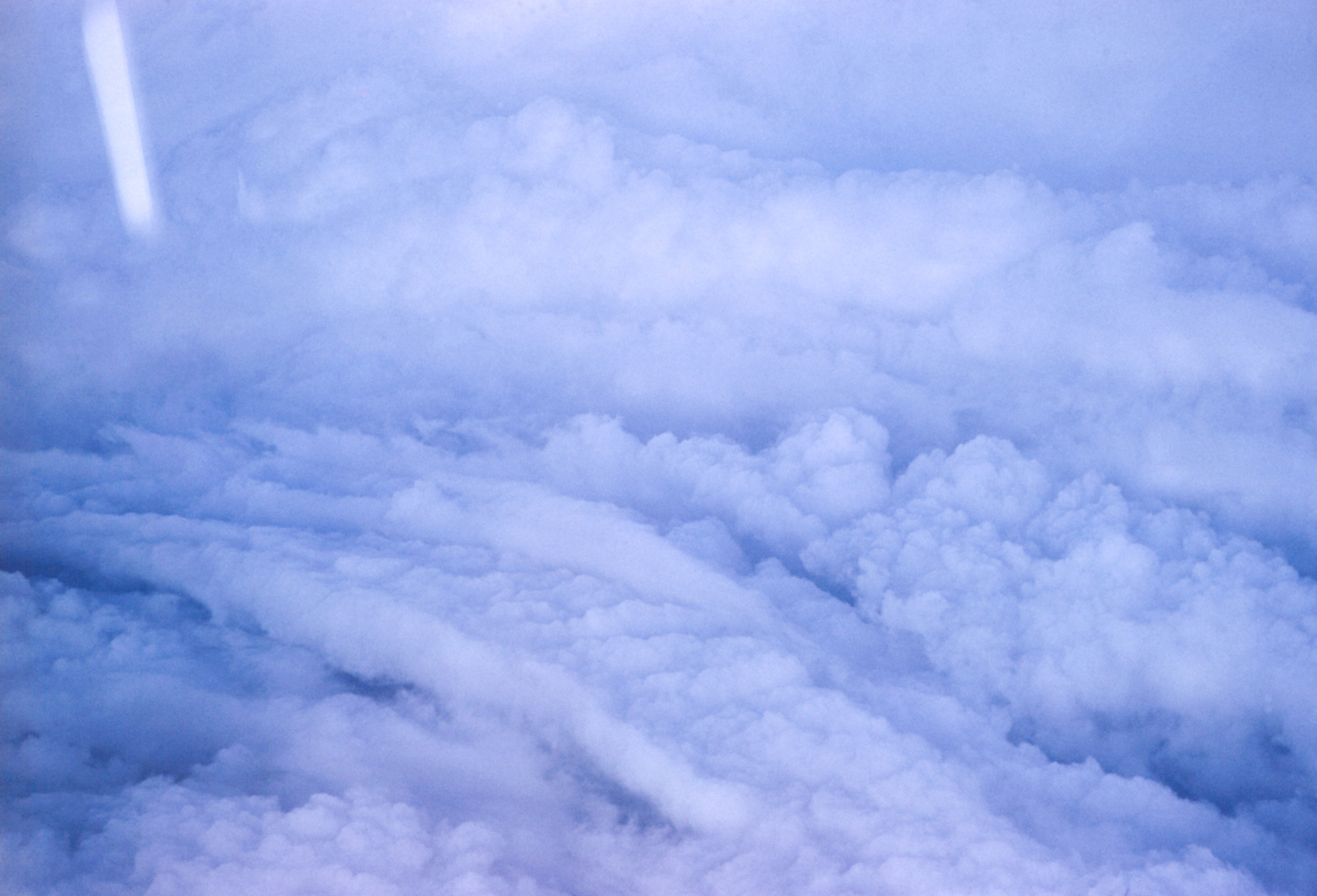
Eye of Hurricane Esther viewed from a Weather Bureau plane

Hurricane Esther was one of the first targets of a Navy experiment in modifying or weakening hurricanes by seeding them. On September 16, a Navy plane flew into the eye of Esther about 400 miles (644 km) northeast of Puerto Rico, and dropped canisters of silver iodide into the storm. The hurricane appeared to weaken slightly in response to the seeding, reportedly by ten percent. This weakening was temporary, however, as the hurricane resumed strengthening shortly after. The aircraft returned the next day to seed again, but the seeding canisters fell outside of the eyewall with no effect on its structure, and the hurricane continued to strengthen. Despite this result, the experiment was erroneously deemed a success, and led to the establishment of Project Stormfury.

== See also ==
- Other storms of the same name
- List of New England hurricanes
- Hurricane Gloria (1985)
- Hurricane Earl (2010)
- Hurricane Jose (2017)
