= Weather modification =

Act of intentionally altering or manipulating the weather

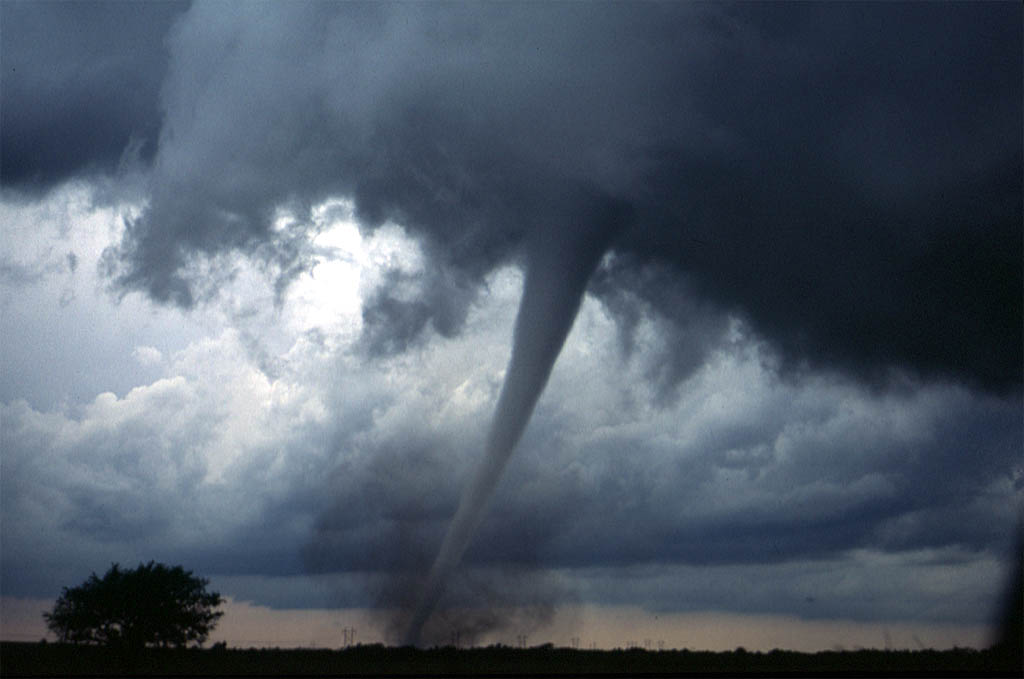
A tornado near Anadarko, Oklahoma during the 1999 Oklahoma tornado outbreak. Weather researchers may aspire to eliminate or control dangerous types of weather such as this.

Weather modification is the act of intentionally manipulating or altering the weather. The most common form of weather modification is cloud seeding, which increases rainfall or snowfall, usually for the purpose of increasing the local water supply. Weather modification can also have the goal of preventing damaging weather, such as hail or hurricanes, from occurring; or of provoking damaging weather against an enemy, as a tactic of military or economic warfare like Operation Popeye, where clouds were seeded to prolong the monsoon in Vietnam. Weather modification in warfare has been banned by the United Nations under the Environmental Modification Convention.

== History ==
A popular belief in Northern Europe was that shooting prevents hail, which thus caused many agricultural towns to fire cannons without ammunition. Veterans of the Seven Years' War, Napoleonic Wars, and the American Civil War reported that rain fell after every large battle. After their stories were collected in War and Weather, the United States Department of War in the late 19th century purchased $9,000 of gunpowder and explosives to detonate them in Texas, in hopes of condensing water vapor into rain. The results of the test, supervised by Robert Dyrenforth, were inconclusive.

Wilhelm Reich performed cloudbusting experiments in the 1950s, the results of which are controversial and were not widely accepted by mainstream science.

In November 1954 the Thailand Royal Rainmaking Project (Thai: โครงการฝนหลวง) was initiated by King Bhumibol Adulyadej. He discovered that many areas faced the problem of drought. Over 82 percent of Thai agricultural land relied on rainfall. Thai farmers were not able to grow crops for lack of water. The royal rainmaking project debuted on 20 July 1969 at his behest, when the first rainmaking attempt was made at Khao Yai National Park. Dry ice flakes were scattered over clouds. Reportedly, some rainfall resulted. In 1971, the government established the Artificial Rainmaking Research and Development Project within the Thai Ministry of Agriculture and Cooperatives.

In January 2011, several newspapers and magazines, including the UK's Sunday Times and Arabian Business, reported that scientists backed by the government of Abu Dhabi, the capital of the United Arab Emirates, had created over 50 artificial rainstorms between July and August 2010 near Al Ain, a city which lies close to the country's border with Oman and is the second-largest city in the Abu Dhabi Emirate. The artificial rainstorms were said to have sometimes caused hail, gales and thunderstorms, baffling local residents.

In the run up to the 2008 Beijing Olympic Games, the Chinese Government said they could control precipitation to some extent and that the Games would not be hampered by bad weather conditions. For this purpose they established a government office called the Beijing Weather Modification Office, which is under the national weather control office.

== Cloud seeding ==
Cloud seeding can be done by ground generators (left) or planes

Cloud seeding is a common technique to enhance precipitation. Cloud seeding entails spraying small particles, such as silver iodide, onto clouds to attempt to affect their development, usually with the goal of increasing precipitation. Cloud seeding only works to the extent that there is already water vapor present in the air. Critics generally contend that claimed successes occur in conditions which were going to lead to rain anyway. It is used in a variety of drought-prone countries, including the United States, China, India, and Russia. In China, there is a perceived dependency upon it in dry regions, and there is a strong suspicion it is used to "wash the air" in dry and heavily polluted places, such as Beijing. In mountainous areas of the United States such as the Rocky Mountains and Sierra Nevada, cloud seeding has been employed since the 1950s.

Project Cirrus was an attempt by General Electric to modify the weather which ran from 1947-1952. During that time, under the supervision of the United States Air Force, attempts were made to create snowstorms and seed hurricanes by using silver iodide. While General Electric reported positive results, they also acknowledged that their experiments were controversial.

The United Arab Emirates has been cloud seeding since the 2000s and aims to increase rainfall by 15-30% per year. The materials used are potassium chloride, sodium chloride, magnesium, and other materials.

=== Consequences ===
==== Societal ====
Not having adequate systems to handle weather modification may have disastrous consequences. "In the city of Jeddah in Western Saudi Arabia was damaged by floods in 2009 that reportedly killed more than 100 people; igniting questions of why the country doesn't have effective drainage systems in place."

==== Human ====
The U.S. National Library of Medicine notes that the silver iodide has no known "ill effects" on people, although people's "hands may have remained yellowed for weeks" after being exposed to it.

== Storm prevention ==
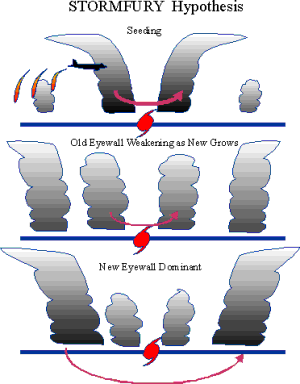
Project Stormfury

Project Stormfury was an attempt to weaken tropical cyclones by flying aircraft into storms and seeding the eyewall with silver iodide. The project was run by the United States Government from 1962 to 1983. A similar project using soot was run in 1958, with inconclusive results. Various methods have been proposed to reduce the harmful effects of hurricanes. Moshe Alamaro of the Massachusetts Institute of Technology proposed using barges with upward-pointing jet engines to trigger smaller storms to disrupt the progress of an incoming hurricane; critics doubt the jets would be powerful enough to make any noticeable difference.

Alexandre Chorin of the University of California, Berkeley, proposed dropping large amounts of environmentally friendly oils on the sea surface to prevent droplet formation. Experiments by Kerry Emanuel of MIT in 2002 suggested that hurricane-force winds would disrupt the oil slick, making it ineffective. Other scientists disputed the factual basis of the theoretical mechanism assumed by this approach.

The Florida company Dyn-O-Mat and its CEO, Peter Cordani, proposed the use of a patented product it developed, called Dyn-O-Gel, to reduce the strength of hurricanes. The substance is a polymer in powder form (a polyacrylic acid derivative) which reportedly has the ability to absorb 1,500 times its own weight in water. The theory is that the polymer is dropped into clouds to remove their moisture and force the storm to use more energy to move the heavier water drops, thus helping to dissipate the storm. When the gel reaches the ocean surface, it is reportedly dissolved. Peter Cordani teamed up with Mark Daniels and Victor Miller, the owners of a government contracting aviation firm AeroGroup which operated ex-military aircraft commercially. Using a high altitude B-57 Bomber, AeroGroup tested the substance dropping 9,000 pounds from the B-57 aircraft's large bomb bay and dispersing it into a large thunderstorm cell just off the east coast of Florida. The tests were documented on film and made international news showing the storms were successfully removed on monitored Doppler radar. In 2003, the program was shut down because of political pressure through NOAA. Numerical simulations performed by NOAA showed however that it would not be a practical solution for large systems like a tropical cyclone.

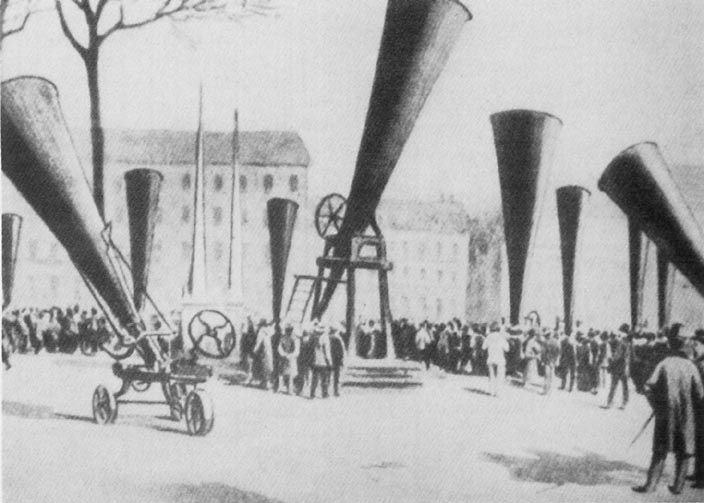
Hail cannons at an international congress on hail shooting held in 1901

Hail cannons have been used by some farmers since the 19th century in an attempt to ward off hail, but there is no reliable scientific evidence to confirm their effectiveness. Another new anti-hurricane technology is a method for the reduction of tropical cyclones' destructive force – pumping sea water into and diffusing it in the wind at the bottom of such tropical cyclones in its eye wall.

== Hurricane modification ==
NOAA published a page addressing various ideas in regard to tropical cyclone manipulation.

In 2007, "How to stop a hurricane" explored various ideas such as:

- Using lasers to discharge lightning in storms which are likely to become hurricanes
- Pouring liquid nitrogen onto the sea to deprive the hurricane of heat energy.
- Creating soot to absorb sunlight and change air temperature and create convection currents in the outer wall.

Researchers from NOAA's hurricane research division addressed hurricane control based ideas.

Later ideas (2017) include laser inversion along the same lines as laser cooling (normally used at cryogenic temperatures) but intended to cool the top 1mm of water. If enough power were to be used then it may be enough, combined with computer modelling, to form an interference pattern able to inhibit a hurricane or significantly reduce its strength by depriving it of heat energy.

Other proposals for hurricane modification include the construction of a large array of offshore wind turbines along the East Coast of the United States. Such turbines would have the dual purpose of generating plentiful energy whilst also reducing the power of oncoming hurricanes before they make landfall. Additionally, meteorologists formerly considered using nuclear bombs on hurricanes, though the scientific establishment has since abandoned the idea. In 2026, researchers at the Advanced Research for Climate Emergencies Initiative called for increased coordination and governance as research accelerates on hurricane modification.

=== Artificial upwelling ===
Pumping up colder deep ocean water in front of a tropical storm to cool the sea surface skin temperature could be a technique used to fight hurricanes in the Atlantic before they develop into major hurricanes.

It is purely speculative and difficult to realize since placing such pumps in the path of a hurricane would be difficult. Furthermore, any such project would need a large number of them to upwell enough water to cool a large enough sea surface area to have any effectiveness. That is without counting the large amount of energy needed to power those pumps and its effects on marine life.

== In military ==
Operation Popeye was a highly classified operation run by the US military from 1967-1972. The purpose was to prolong the monsoon in Southeast Asia. The overwhelming precipitation successfully disrupted the tactical logistics of the Vietnamese army. Operation Popeye is believed as the first successful practice of weather modification technology in warfare. After it was unveiled, weather modification in warfare was banned by the Environmental Modification Convention (ENMOD).

In "Benign Weather Modification" published in March 1997, Air Force Major Barry B. Coble superficially documents the existence of weather modification science where he traces the developments that have occurred, notably, in the hands of the Pentagon and CIA's staunchest ideological enemies.

- The first scientifically controlled and monitored effort generally recognized by the meteorological community as constituting weather modification occurred in 1948. When Dr. Irving Langmuir first experimented with artificially seeding clouds to produce rain in New Mexico, his experiments showed positive results – sparking tremendous interest in the field nearly overnight.
- Many countries throughout the world practice weather modification. The Russians have long been interested in using weather modification as a way to control hail.

In the 1990s a directive from the chief of staff of the Air Force Ronald R. Fogleman was issued to examine the concepts, capabilities, and technologies the United States would require to remain the dominant air and space force in the future.

== In law ==
=== US and Canada agreement ===
In 1975, the US and Canada entered into an agreement under the auspices of the United Nations for the exchange of information on weather modification activity.

=== 1977 UN Environmental Modification Convention ===
Weather modification, particularly hostile weather warfare, was addressed by the "United Nations General Assembly Resolution 31/72, TIAS 9614 Convention on the Prohibition of Military or Any Other Hostile Use of Environmental Modification Techniques." The Convention was signed in Geneva on May 18, 1977; entered into force on October 5, 1978; ratified by U.S. President Jimmy Carter on December 13, 1979; and the U.S. ratification deposited in New York on January 17, 1980.

=== US National Oceanic and Atmospheric Administration ===
In the US, the National Oceanic and Atmospheric Administration keeps records of weather modification projects on behalf of the Secretary of Commerce, under the authority of Public Law 92-205, 15 USC § 330B, enacted in 1971.

=== Proposed US legislation ===
U.S. Senate Bill 517 and U.S. House Bill 2995 were two bills proposed in 2005 that would have expanded experimental weather modification, to establish a Weather Modification Operations and Research Board, and implemented a national weather modification policy. Neither was made into law.

Senate Bill 1807 and House Bill 3445, identical bills introduced July 17, 2007, proposed to established a Weather Mitigation Advisory and Research Board to fund weather modification research

=== Passed Tennessee legislation ===
Tennessee bill HB 2063/SB 2691 was signed into law on April 11, 2024. This bill bans the "intentional injection, release, or dispersion" of chemicals within Tennessee "with the express purpose of affecting temperature, weather, or the intensity of the sunlight".

The text of the bill doesn't explicitly reference the chemtrail conspiracy theory, but the sponsor of the bill, Sen. Steve Southerland said that it is one of the intended targets of the bill.

== In religion and mythology ==
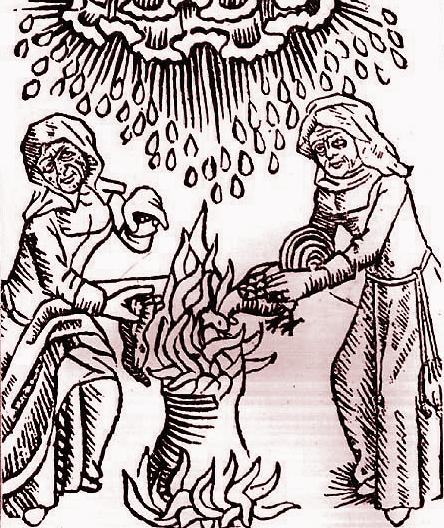
Witches concoct a brew to summon a hailstorm.

Magical and religious practices to control the weather are attested in a variety of cultures. In ancient India, it is said that yajna or Vedic rituals of chanting mantras and offerings were performed by rishis to bring sudden bursts of rainfall in rain starved regions.

Some Indigenous Americans, like some Europeans, had rituals which they believed could induce rain.

The early modern era saw people observe that during battles the firing of cannons and other firearms often initiated precipitation.

In Greek mythology, Iphigenia was offered as a human sacrifice to appease the wrath of the goddess Artemis, who had becalmed the Achaean fleet at Aulis at the beginning of the Trojan War. In Homer's Odyssey, Aeolus, keeper of the winds, bestowed Odysseus and his crew with a gift of the four winds in a bag. However, the sailors opened the bag while Odysseus slept, looking for booty (money), and as a result, were blown off course by the resulting gale. In ancient Rome, the lapis manalis was a sacred stone kept outside the walls of Rome in a temple of Mars. When Rome suffered from drought, the stone was dragged into the city. The Berwick witches of Scotland were found guilty of using black magic to summon storms to murder King James VI of Scotland by seeking to sink the ship upon which he travelled. Scandinavian witches allegedly claimed to sell the wind in bags or magically confined into wooden staves; they sold the bags to seamen who could release them when becalmed. In various towns of Navarre, prayers petitioned Saint Peter to grant rain in times of drought. If the rain was not forthcoming, the statue of St Peter was removed from the church and tossed into a river.

In the Hebrew Bible, it is recorded that Elijah in the way of judgement, told King Ahab that neither dew nor rain would fall until Elijah called for it. It is further recorded that the ensuing drought lasted for a period of 3.5 years at which time Elijah called the rains to come again and the land was restored. The New Testament records Jesus Christ controlling a storm by speaking to it.

In Islam, Salat Al-Istisqa’ (Prayer for Rain) is taken as a recourse when seeking rain from God during times of drought.

== Conspiracy theories ==
Weather modification, along with climate engineering, is a recurring theme in conspiracy theories.

The chemtrails conspiracy suggests that trails left by aircraft contain nefarious chemical or biological agents which are being used as chemical or biological warfare, or that weather control projects are in some way sinister. (Note: Silver iodide does have some toxicity, thus it could be argued cloud seeding trails containing silver iodide are chemtrails. The conspiracy theory aspect however refers more to undisclosed chemicals, intentional poisoning, or something that is being done for a nefarious purpose.) The theory may also implicate contrails, which have been shown to be different to chemtrails.

Other theories attempt to implicate scientific infrastructure such as the High-frequency Active Auroral Research Program (HAARP).

== In popular culture ==
In the franchise of both The Bionic Woman and The Six Million Dollar Man. In 1976, the weather control machine by Dr. Franklin, played by John Houseman featured in the "Kill Oscar" trilogy.

Frank Herbert's Dune series features weather control technology, mainly on two planets: Arrakis, where the technology is used by the Fremen to assure privacy from observation and hide their true population and their plans to terraform the planet from the Imperium; and, Chapterhouse, where the Bene Gesserit intend to turn the planet into a desert.

The ability to manipulate the weather has become a common superpower in superhero fiction. A notable example is the Marvel Comics character Storm.

In the children's book Cloudy with a Chance of Meatballs, the fictional town of Chewandswallow has weather that rains down food instead of actual rain or snow, which becomes so extreme it forces its citizens to move to a different town. This was adapted into a movie where Flint Lockwood, the town's outcast and scientist, has created a machine that converts water from the clouds into food.

In the Star Trek franchise, the United Federation of Planets has weather modification technology, in addition to terraforming capabilities.

In One Piece, a (fictitious) powder called Dance Powder capable of making artificial rain plays a key role in Alabasta Arc's plot.

== See also ==
- Alberta Hail Project
- Beijing Weather Modification Office
- Chemtrail conspiracy theory
- Climate engineering
- Cloud seeding
- Environmental Modification Convention (ENMOD)
- Extreme weather
- Fog Investigation and Dispersal Operation (FIDO)
- Global warming
- Hurricane Control conspiracy
- Land surface effects on climate
- Operation Popeye
- Project Cumulus
- Project Stormfury
- Water scarcity
- Weather forecasting
- Weather modification in North America
- List of weather modification projects in the United States during 2025
