= Project Stormfury =

NOAA weather modification program

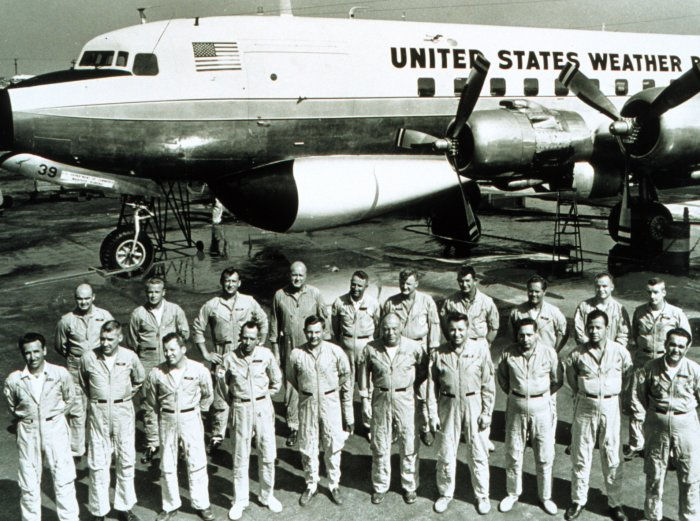
1966 photo of the crew and personnel of Project Stormfury

Project Stormfury (or stylized as Project STORMFURY) was an attempt to weaken tropical cyclones by flying aircraft into them and seeding them with silver iodide. The project was run by the United States Government from 1962 to 1983. The hypothesis was that the silver iodide would cause supercooled water in the storm to freeze, disrupting the inner structure of the hurricane, and this led to seeding several Atlantic hurricanes. However, it was later shown that this hypothesis was incorrect. It was determined that most hurricanes do not contain enough supercooled water for cloud seeding to be effective. Additionally, researchers found that unseeded hurricanes often undergo the same structural changes that were expected from seeded hurricanes. This finding called Stormfury's successes into question, as the changes reported now had a natural explanation.

The last experimental flight was flown in 1971, due to a lack of candidate storms and a changeover in NOAA's fleet. Project Stormfury was officially canceled more than a decade after the last modification experiment. Although the project failed to achieve its goal of reducing the destructiveness of hurricanes, its observational data and storm lifecycle research helped improve meteorologists' ability to forecast the movement and intensity of hurricanes.

== Hypothesis ==
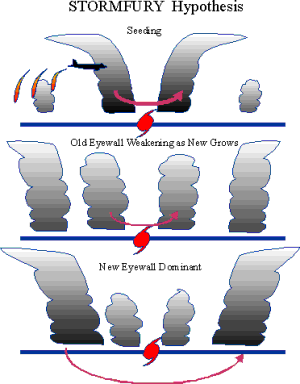
The working hypothesis of Project Stormfury

Cloud seeding was first attempted by Vincent Schaefer and Irving Langmuir. After witnessing the artificial creation of ice crystals, Langmuir became an enthusiastic proponent of weather modification. Schaefer found that when he dumped crushed dry ice into a cloud, precipitation in the form of snow resulted.

With regard to hurricanes, it was hypothesized that by seeding the area around the eyewall with silver iodide, latent heat would be released. This would promote the formation of a new eyewall. As this new eyewall was larger than the old eyewall, the winds of the tropical cyclone would be weaker due to a reduced pressure gradient. Even a small reduction in the speed of a hurricane's winds would be beneficial: since the damage potential of a hurricane increased as the square of the wind speed, a slight lowering of wind speed would have a large reduction in destructiveness.

Due to Langmuir's efforts, and the research of Schaefer at General Electric, the concept of using cloud seeding to weaken hurricanes gathered momentum. Indeed, Schaefer had caused a major snowstorm on December 20, 1946 by seeding a cloud. This caused GE to drop out for legal reasons. Schaefer and Langmuir assisted the U.S. military as advisors for Project Cirrus, the first large study of cloud physics and weather modification. Its most important goal was to try to weaken hurricanes.

== Project Cirrus ==
Project Cirrus
- Formation: 1946
- Dissolved: October 15, 1947; 78 years ago
- Type: Public–private research
- Headquarters: Schenectady, New York

Project Cirrus was the first attempt to modify a hurricane. It was a collaboration of the General Electric Corporation, the US Army Signal Corps, the Office of Naval Research, and the US Air Force. After several preparations and initial skepticism by government scientists, the first attempt to modify a hurricane began on October 13, 1947 on Hurricane Cape Sable that was heading west to east and out to sea.

The project's two B-17s and a B-29 of the 53rd Weather Reconnaissance group were dispatched from MacDill Field, Florida, to intercept the hurricane. The seeding B-17 flew along the rainbands of the hurricane, and dropped nearly 180 pounds (82 kilograms) of crushed dry ice into the clouds. The crew reported "Pronounced modification of the cloud deck seeded". It is not known if that was due to the seeding. Next, the hurricane changed direction and made landfall near Savannah, Georgia. The public blamed the seeding, and Irving Langmuir claimed that the reversal had been caused by human intervention. Cirrus was canceled, and lawsuits were threatened. Only the fact that a system in 1906 had taken a similar path, as well as evidence showing that the storm had already begun to turn when seeding began, ended the litigation. This disaster set back the cause of seeding hurricanes for eleven years.

At first the seeding was officially denied and it took years before the government admitted it. According to the September 12, 1965 edition of the Fort Lauderdale News and Sun-Sentinel, in 1947 a hurricane "went whacky" and "Twelve years later it was admitted the storm had in fact been seeded."

== Between the projects ==
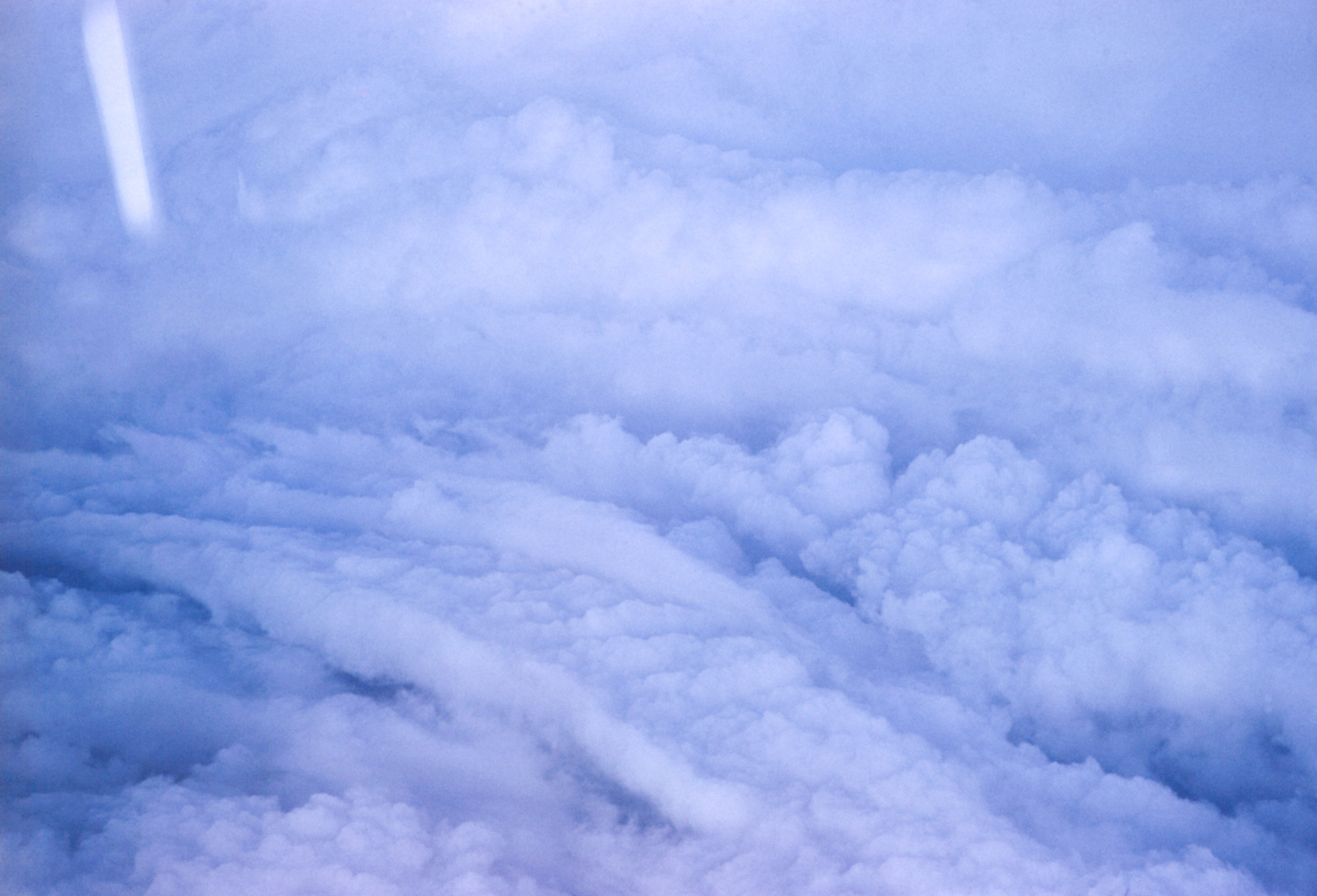
Eye of Hurricane Esther

The United States Weather Bureau's National Hurricane Research Project, founded in 1955, had as one of its objectives to investigate the scientific validity of hurricane modification methods. To this end, silver iodide dispensers were tested in Hurricane Daisy in August 1958. The flares were deployed outside of the hurricane eyewall, so this was an equipment test rather than a modification experiment. The equipment malfunctioned in all but one of the flights, and no conclusive data was acquired.

The first seeding experiment since the Cirrus disaster was attempted on September 16, 1961, into Hurricane Esther by NHRP and the United States Navy aircraft. Eight cylinders of silver iodide were dropped into Esther's eyewall, and winds were recorded as weakening by 10 percent. The next day, more seeding flights were made. This time, the silver iodide did not fall into the eyewall, and no reduction in windspeed was observed. These two results were interpreted as making the experiment a "success".

The seedings into Hurricane Esther led to the establishment of Project Stormfury in 1962. Project Stormfury was a joint venture of the United States Department of Commerce and the United States Navy.

== Project BATON ==
The objective of Project BATON was the analysis of the life history of thunderstorms. A Department of Defense research activity supported by the Advanced Research Project Agency, Project BATON sought to expand understanding of storm physics as an aid to weather forecasting, fire prevention, and, possibly, for artificially controlling the weather. Dr. Helmut Weickmann, as an employee of the U.S. Army Signal Research and Development Laboratory, and Dr. Paul MacCready of Meteorology Research, Inc., were joint leaders of the Project BATON team.

During the 1962 July–August storm season in Flagstaff, Arizona, the scientists, selected "guinea pig" storms, and seeded them with chemicals. Effects were thoroughly analyzed from the ground and from the air with time-lapse motion picture cameras, stereo still cameras, storm radar, lightning detectors, and airborne heat sensors. Among the agents inserted in selected clouds were "condensation nuclei" which temporarily increased the number of water droplets in the cloud, and pulverized dry ice, which turns a portion of the cloud to fine snow crystals that remain aloft. The utilization of these agents facilitated study of a storm's characteristics.

== Project STORMFURY begins ==
Robert Simpson became its first director, serving in this capacity until 1965. There were several guidelines used in selecting which storms to seed. The hurricane had to have a less than 10 percent chance of approaching inhabited land within a day; it had to be within range of the seeding aircraft; and it had to be a fairly intense storm with a well-formed eye. The primary effect of these criteria was to make possible seeding targets extremely rare.

No suitable storms formed in the 1962 season. Next year, Stormfury began by conducting experiments on cumulus clouds. From August 17 to 20 of that year, experiments were conducted in 11 clouds, of which six were seeded and five were controls. In five of the six seeded clouds, changes consistent with the working hypothesis were observed.

On August 23, 1963, Hurricane Beulah was the site of the next seeding attempt. It had an indistinct eyewall. In addition, mistakes were made, as the seedings of silver iodide were dropped in the wrong places. As a consequence, nothing happened. The next day, another attempt was made, and the seeders hit their targets. The eyewall was observed to fall apart and be replaced by another eyewall with a larger radius. The sustained winds also fell by twenty percent. All in all, the results of the experiments on Beulah were "encouraging but inconclusive."

In the six years after Beulah, no seedings were conducted for several different reasons. In 1964, measurement and observation equipment was not ready to be used. The year after that, all flights were used for additional experimentation in non-hurricane clouds.

Joanne Simpson became its director beginning in 1965. While out to sea in August of the 1965 Atlantic hurricane season, Stormfury meteorologists decided that Hurricane Betsy was a good candidate for seeding. However, the storm immediately swung towards land, and on September 1, the planned flights were canceled. For some reason, the press was not notified that there were no seedings, and several newspapers reported that it had begun. As Betsy passed close to the Bahamas and smashed into southern Florida, the public and Congress thought that seeding was underway and blamed Stormfury. It took two months for Stormfury officials to convince Congress that Betsy was not seeded, and the project was allowed to continue. A second candidate, Hurricane Elena, stayed too far out to sea.

After Betsy, two other hurricanes came close to being seeded. Hurricane Faith was considered a likely candidate, but it stayed out of range of the seeding planes. That same year, recon flights were conducted into Hurricane Inez, but there were no seedings. Both the 1967 and 1968 seasons were inactive. Because of that, there were no suitable seeding targets in either of those two seasons.

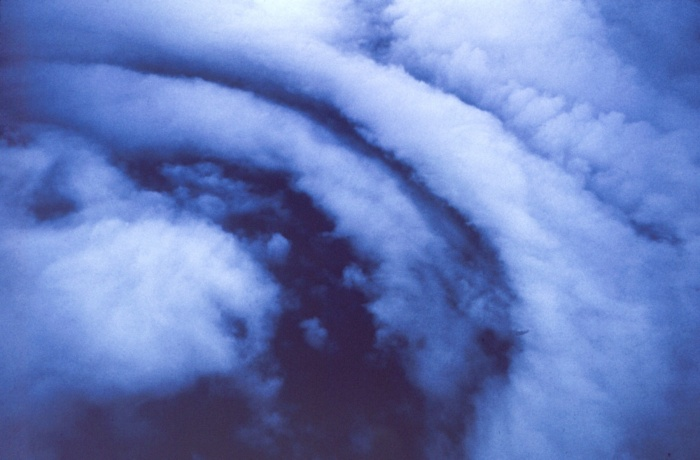
The eye of Hurricane Debbie on August 20

Dr. R. Cecil Gentry became the director of Stormfury in 1968. There were no more near-seedings until 1969. In the interim, equipment was improved. What once was the primitive method of hand-dumping dry ice was replaced with rocket canisters loaded with silver iodide, and then gun-like devices mounted on the wings of the airplanes that fired silver iodide into the clouds. Observation equipment was improved. Additional reconnaissance data was utilized to modify the working hypothesis. The new theory took cumulus towers outside the eyewall into account. According to the revised theory, by seeding the towers, latent heat would be released. This would trigger the start of new convection, which would then cause a new eyewall. Since the new eyewall was outside the original one, the first eyewall would be choked of energy and fall apart. In addition, since the new eyewall was broader than the old one, the winds would be lower due to a less sharp pressure difference.

Hurricane Debbie in 1969 provided the best opportunity to test the underpinnings of Project Stormfury. In many ways it was the perfect storm for seeding: it did not threaten any land; it passed within range of seeding aircraft; and was intense with a distinct eye. On August 18 and again on August 20, thirteen planes flew out to the storm to monitor and seed it. On the first day, windspeeds fell by 31%. On the second day, windspeeds fell by 18%. Both changes were consistent with Stormfury's working hypothesis. Indeed, the results were so encouraging that "a greatly expanded research program was planned." Among other conclusions was the need for frequent seeding at close to hourly intervals.

The 1970 and 1971 seasons provided no suitable seeding candidates. Despite this, flights were conducted into Hurricane Ginger. Ginger was not a suitable storm for seeding, due to its diffuse, indistinct nature. The seeding had no effect. Ginger was the last seeding done by Project Stormfury.

== After the seedings ==
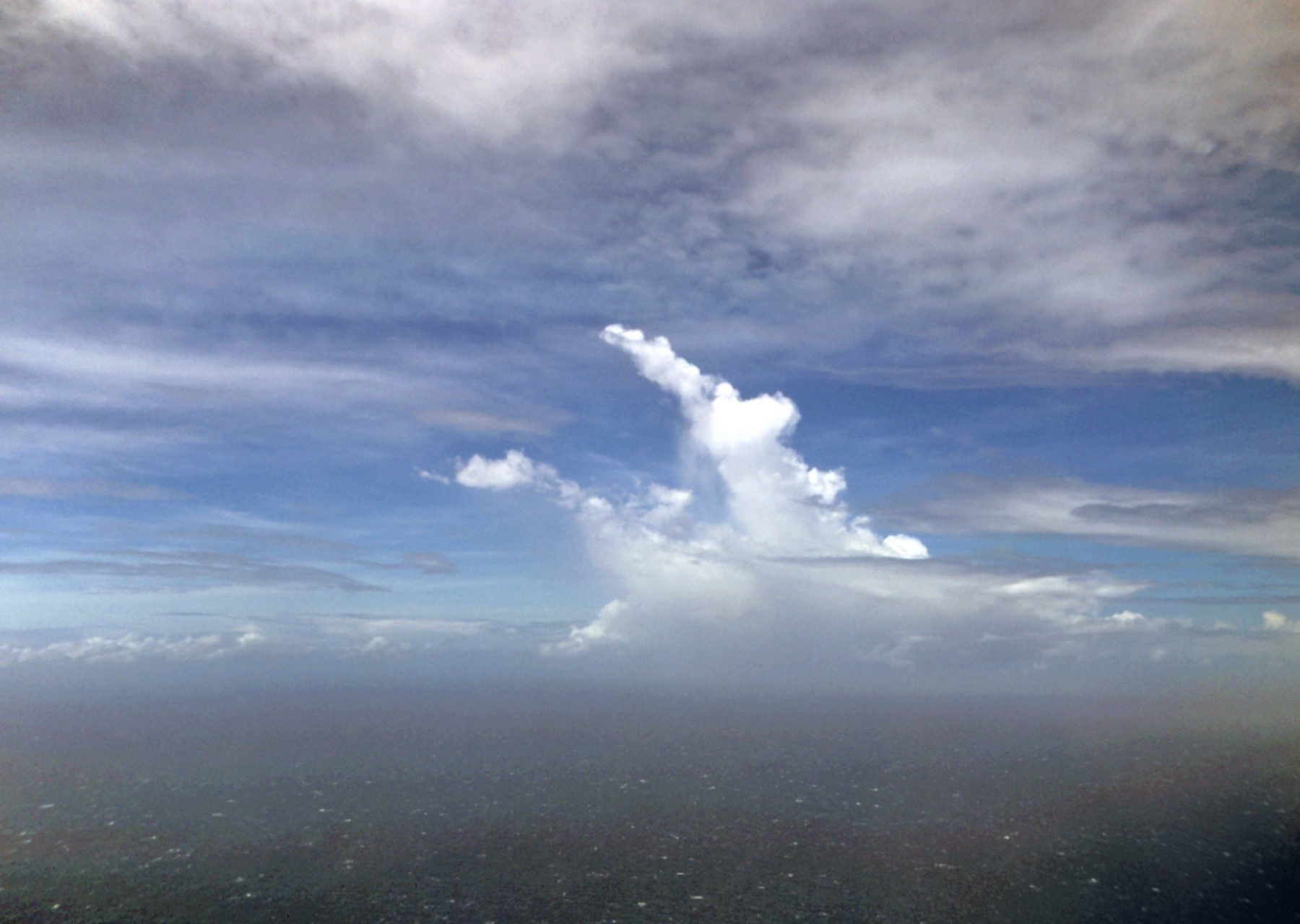
Stormfury inside Tropical Storm Dorothy

Atlantic hurricanes meeting all of the criteria were extremely rare, which made duplication of the "success" reached with Hurricane Debbie extremely difficult. Meanwhile, developments outside of meteorology hindered the cause of hurricane modification.

In the early 1970s, the Navy withdrew from the project. Stormfury began to refocus its efforts on understanding, rather than modifying, tropical cyclones. At the same time, the Project's B-17s were nearing the end of their operational lifetimes. At the cost of $30 million (year unknown) two Lockheed P-3's were acquired. Due to the rarity of Atlantic hurricanes meeting the safety requirements, plans were made to move Stormfury to the Pacific and experiment on the large number of typhoons there. This action required many of the same safety requirements as in the Atlantic, but had the advantage of a much higher number of potential subjects.

The plan was to begin again in 1976, and seed typhoons by flying out of Guam. However, political issues blocked the plan. The People's Republic of China announced that it would not be happy if a seeded typhoon changed course and made landfall on its shores, while Japan declared itself willing to put up with difficulties caused by typhoons because that country got more than half of its rainfall from tropical cyclones.

Similar plans to operate Stormfury in the eastern north Pacific or in the Australian region also collapsed.

== Failure of the working hypothesis ==
Multiple eyewalls had been detected in very strong hurricanes before, including Typhoon Sarah and Hurricane Donna. Double eyewalls were usually only seen in very intense systems. They had also been observed post-seeding in some of the seeded storms. At the time, the only observations of rapid changes in eyewall diameter, other than during presumably successful seedings, occurred during rapid changes in storm intensity. It remained unclear whether the seedings caused the secondary eyewalls or whether it was just part of a natural cycle (because correlation does not imply causation). It was initially thought that eyewall changes similar to those observed in seeded but not unseeded systems provided the evidence that Project Stormfury was a success. But if it was later observed that such eyewall changes were common in unseeded systems as well, such observations would throw doubt on the hypothesis and assumptions driving Project Stormfury.

Data and observations did in fact begin to accumulate that debunked Stormfury's working hypothesis. Beginning with Hurricanes Anita and David, flights by hurricane hunting aircraft encountered events similar to what happened in "successfully" seeded storms. Anita itself had a weak example of a concentric eyewall cycle, and David a more dramatic one. In August 1980, Hurricane Allen passed through the Atlantic, Caribbean, and Gulf of Mexico. It also underwent changes in the diameter of its eye and developed multiple eyewalls. All this was consistent with the behavior that would have been expected of Allen had it been seeded. Thus, what Stormfury thought to have accomplished by seeding was also happening on its own.

Other observations in Hurricanes Anita, David, Frederic, and Allen also discovered that tropical cyclones have very little supercooled water and a great deal of ice crystals. The reason that tropical cyclones have little supercooled water is that the updrafts within such a system are too weak to prevent water from either falling as rain or freezing. As cloud seeding needed supercooled water to function, the lack of supercooled water meant that seeding would have no effect.

Those observations called the basis for Project Stormfury into question. In the middle of 1983, Stormfury was finally canceled after the hypothesis guiding its efforts was invalidated.

== Legacy ==
In the sense of weakening hurricanes to reduce their destructiveness, Project Stormfury was a complete failure because it did not distinguish between natural phenomena in tropical cyclones and the impact of human intervention. Millions of dollars had been spent. In the end, "[Project] STORMFURY had two fatal flaws: it was neither microphysically nor statistically feasible."

In addition, Stormfury had been a primary generator of funding for the Hurricane Research Division. While the project was operational, the HRD's budget had been around $4 million (1975 USD; $16 million 2008 USD), with a staff of approximately 100 people. In 2000, the HRD employed 30 people and has a budget of roughly $2.6 million each year.

However, Project Stormfury had positive results as well. Knowledge gained during flights proved invaluable in debunking its hypotheses. Other science resulted in a greater understanding of tropical cyclones. In addition, the Lockheed P-3s were perfectly suitable for gathering data on tropical cyclones, allowing improved forecasting of these monstrous storms. Those planes were still used by the NOAA as of 2005.

Former Cuban president Fidel Castro alleged that Project Stormfury was an attempt to weaponize hurricanes.

== See also ==
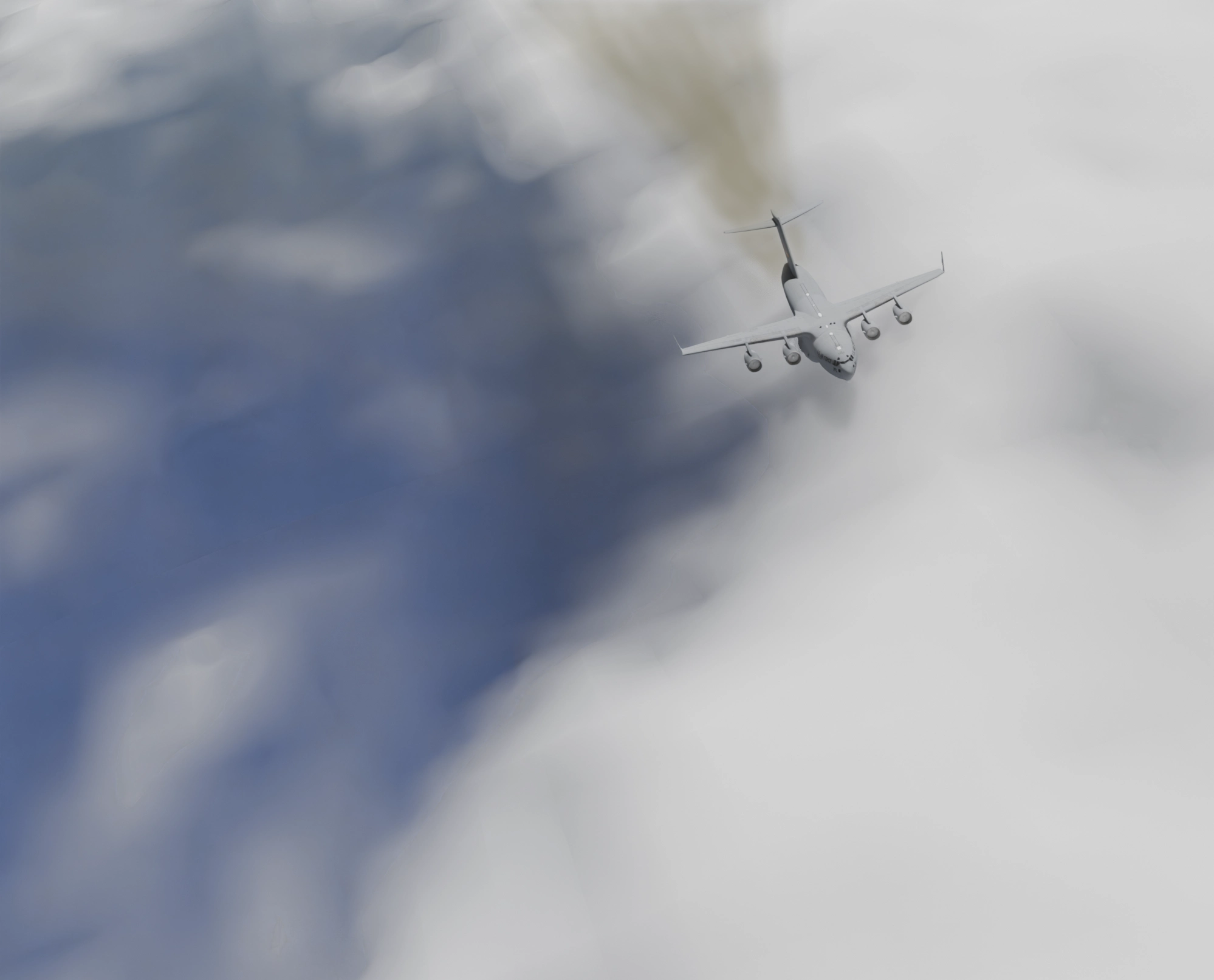
3D design of a C-17 seeding a hurricane or aerosolizing it to mitigate the storm

- Alberta Hail Project
- Cape Verde hurricane
- Deep ocean water – Cold, salty water deep below the surface of Earth's oceans
- List of United States government meteorology research projects
- Operation Popeye
- Saharan air layer – dust aerosols blown from Africa that mitigates Atlantic hurricane formation
- Sea surface temperature
- Weather modification in North America
- Wind shearing
