= Weather Wars =

Weather Wars may refer to:

- Weather wars, a description of sensationalist journalism
- North Atlantic weather war, during World War II

== See also ==
- Weather warfare
- Weather warning
