= Nuclear strikes on hurricanes =

Proposal to stop or mitigate hurricanes

Since 1945, the American press, public, and individual scientists have proposed using nuclear bombs on hurricanes as a way to disrupt or destroy them. Proponents argue one or more nuclear bombs can disintegrate, redirect, or at least weaken a hurricane, preventing or mitigating a natural disaster. Prominent physicists such as Vladimir K. Zworykin and Edward Teller have entertained this proposal. At various times, elected politicians have expressed enthusiasm, and government agencies such as the Weather Bureau have explored it as an option. At least one meteorologist has written a detailed scientific proposal on potentially using nuclear bombs on hurricanes. Other public figures and scientists, including U.S. president Harry Truman, have spoken out against these proposals.

This idea persists in the 21st century, despite a lack of scientific backing. The US National Oceanic and Atmospheric Administration (NOAA) notes that a nuclear bomb would not release enough energy to affect a hurricane, and that a nuclear detonation would release radioactive fallout. A Weather Bureau study suggests that any use of nuclear bombs could actually intensify a hurricane. The legality of using nuclear bombs on hurricanes is disputed—international treaties may prohibit it.

== History ==
=== 20th century ===
==== 1940s: Hiroshima, Florida proposals, and Zworykin ====
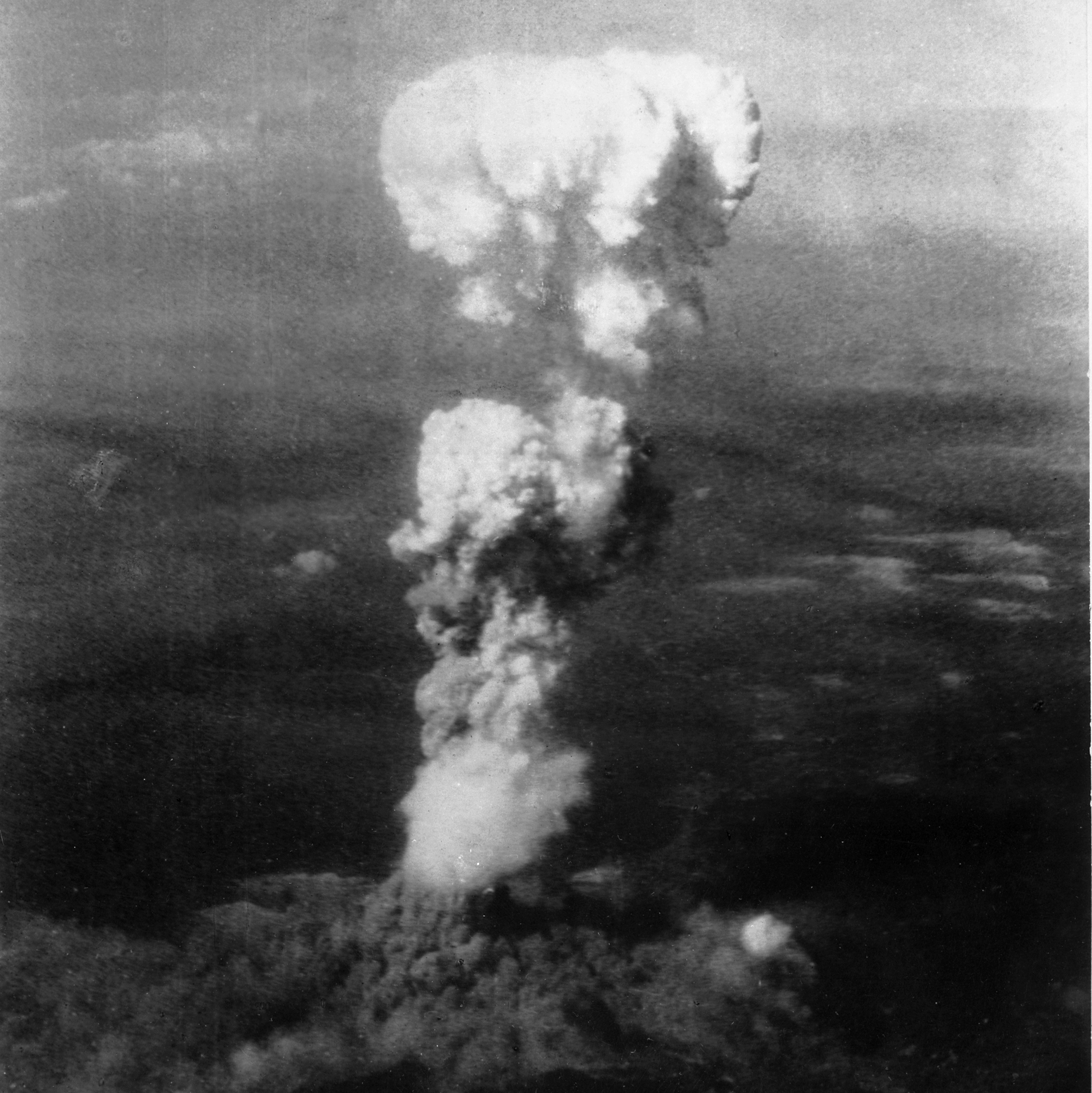
The rising mushroom cloud over Hiroshima after the bombing, August 6, 1945

Soon after the U.S. deployed a nuclear bomb on Hiroshima in 1945, the American press and public began speculating about using such bombs to control hurricanes. Attacking hurricanes with conventional bombs had already been proposed, though it had never been tried. In August 1945, meteorologists Grady Norton and Paul Kutschenreuter considered the idea but remained cautious. They acknowledged that much remained unknown, and that a bomb could inject energy into a hurricane, worsening it, or simply fail to affect it at all. Physicist E.T. Lindstrom called it conceivable in theory but added that the Hiroshima bomb (Little Boy) would not be big enough to disrupt any hurricane. That week, Lee County, Florida offered a 7,500-acre tract for testing nuclear bombs to be deployed against hurricanes.

Later that month, Miami Beach, Florida mayor Herbert A. Frink wrote to U.S. president Harry Truman requesting that he fire a nuclear bomb at the next Florida-bound hurricane, disintegrating it. Truman declined, noting that nuclear tests in New Mexico showed little effect on the weather, but referred him to engineer Vladimir K. Zworykin, who was interested in the idea. Zworykin contacted Frink, requesting that they meet in Miami in September 1945. He proposed "electronic techniques" that could control hurricanes or weather in general. Frink confirmed receipt of the message. That October, Zworykin wrote "Outline of Weather Proposal", suggesting that storms could be disrupted if one could perfectly predict their formation. He proposed various methods—including using nuclear bombs—to destroy them. John von Neumann and Athelstan Spilhaus endorsed his ideas. In 1947, however, Zworykin repudiated the idea of "[directly influencing]" hurricanes, noting that they release too much energy.

==== 1950s: Public demand and Reed ====
The U.S. Weather Bureau received numerous suggestions to drop nuclear bombs on hurricanes (or forming storms) during the intense 1955 hurricane season. Edward Teller, a nuclear physicist who designed the hydrogen bomb, vaguely suggested that advances in atomic science could prevent hurricanes. Chief of the Weather Bureau Francis Reichelderfer seriously doubted these ideas, stating that even multiple bombs would be too insignificant to affect a hurricane. Theodore Gleiter, the head of the Weather Bureau's hurricane warning system, speculated that the radioactive fallout from a bombing could kill ten to a thousand times more people than the storm itself.

Meteorologist Jack Reed took inspiration from the 1952 Ivy Mike nuclear test and drew up plans to disrupt hurricanes with nuclear bombs. Reed, an early hurricane hunter, had worked in the U.S. nuclear test program and studied the atmospheric effects of nuclear explosions. He authored the paper "Some Speculations on the Effects of Nuclear Explosions on Hurricanes", containing two proposals: Plan A and Plan B. Plan A envisioned using one or two 20-megaton nuclear bombs to destroy a hurricane's symmetry, weakening it and redirecting it back towards the ocean. Plan B envisioned using a single 20-megaton nuclear bomb, or many smaller bombs, to blow the eye of the storm into the stratosphere, which would slow or halt the hurricane. He was amenable to both dropping the bomb from an airplane or launching it from a submarine. He argued that radiation would have minimal effects and did not address potential harm to marine life. He presented these proposals to the 1959 symposium on Project Plowshare and an American Meteorological Society conference, and unsuccessfully sought its inclusion in the International Geophysical Year.

National Geographic suggests that the American public began consistently mailing government agencies about the idea in the late 1950s—writing in 2019 that it was a six-decade-old phenomenon. Contemporary reporting from United Press International suggests that this included members of the U.S. Congress.

==== 1960s to 1990s: Weather Bureau and Teller ====
In 1961, AP reported that the Weather Bureau was studying the possibility of bombing hurricanes with conventional or nuclear bombs. In a speech to the National Press Club, Reichelderfer stated that using TNT was possible within two or three years, but that deploying nuclear bombs was still a "gleam in the eye". He added that both ideas were in the "think stage". UPI reported that the bureau and the Atomic Energy Commission held informal discussions about using nuclear bombs on hurricanes. Reichelderfer was quoted as stating that a one-megaton bomb could affect a hurricane, in either a "good or bad" way. He also stated that one-megaton nuclear bomb cost $1 million USD (equivalent to $8,012,771 in 2024), providing the first public estimate of the cost of a hydrogen bomb by a government official.

In 1990, Teller suggested that nuclear bombs could be used to trigger small hurricanes in conditions conducive to hurricanes before large ones could form. He added that this solution was speculative—akin to "performing surgery without knowledge of anatomy" if applied without more scientific knowledge.

=== 21st century ===
Avatar of Donald J. Trump

Donald J. Trump
(@realDonaldTrump)
tweeted:

The story by Axios that President Trump wanted to blow up large hurricanes with nuclear weapons prior to reaching shore is ridiculous. I never said this. Just more FAKE NEWS!

Aug 26, 2019, 5:25 a.m.

In 2004, an aging Jack Reed reiterated his support for nuclear bombing hurricanes, incorrectly asserting that no one had challenged the physics of his proposal.

In 2019, Axios reported that U.S. president Donald Trump had suggested using nuclear bombs to stop hurricanes on numerous occasions. Top officials reportedly responded with incredulity and assured him that the matter would be looked into. President Trump strongly denied these claims, calling the report "fake news". The National Hurricane Center noted that it received three to four dozen similar suggestions every hurricane season. Former Secretary of State Hillary Clinton and science communicator Bill Nye publicly opposed the idea.

== Current evaluation of feasibility ==
The 21st century scientific consensus is against deploying nuclear bombs on hurricanes, despite a history of meteorologists entertaining the idea.

In 1959, UPI reported that the Weather Bureau had conducted a study on using nuclear bombs on hurricanes. The bureau categorized the hurricane life cycle into four parts: formation, intensification, maturity, and dissipation. The agency reached the following conclusions about using a nuclear bomb in each of its life cycle stages:

- Formation: Hurricanes form in areas with thunderstorms and showers, and it would be necessary to bomb every single one of these areas to completely preclude hurricane formation (assuming it is possible at all). The bureau rejected this as impractical. Furthermore, any bombs could warm a nascent storm, helping it form.
- Intensification: During the one-to-three day intensification period, a nuclear bomb could accelerate the process by adding energy to the system.
- Maturity: A fully mature hurricane would be far more energetic than even a large nuclear bomb, and sources its energy from heat. A nuclear bomb could intensify the hurricane.
- Dissipation: A dissipating hurricane may re-intensify briefly, warmed by the nuclear bomb.

The researchers also added that they did not know of any method to slow hurricane winds with a nuclear bomb and rejected redirecting hurricanes, noting that it would involve the manipulation of air streams "on the scale of continents and oceans."

Needless to say, this is not a good idea.

— Meteorologist Christopher Landsea of the NOAA, on using nuclear bombs on hurricanes

The NOAA finds the idea infeasible, and maintains a webpage on the topic. The NOAA notes that a hurricane emits as much heat as a 10-megaton nuclear bomb every 20 minutes, and cannot be shrunk from Category 5 to Category 2 without displacing half a billion tons of air. The NOAA and multiple meteorologists note that using a nuclear bomb on a hurricane could make it radioactive. It is unknown how far the fallout could spread, though in 1955, the head of the Weather Bureau's hurricane warning system commented that the fallout could kill ten to a thousand times more people than the hurricane.

== Legality ==
In 1990, the United States ratified the Peaceful Nuclear Explosions Treaty, barring any nonmilitary nuclear tests with yields exceeding 150 kilotons. According to the National Geographic and Houghton, the treaty would prohibit the deployment of a large nuclear bomb to destroy a hurricane. However, political scientist Scott Sagan argues that test ban treaties would be irrelevant, because deployment against a threat would be a use of bombs, not a test. He further notes that the U.S. president has sole nuclear launch authority, so no domestic law impedes a president from bombing a hurricane.

In 2020, U.S. Rep. Sylvia Garcia proposed a bill in response to a reported presidential interest in bombing hurricanes. The bill barred the government from using nuclear bombs for weather modification, including to weaken or destroy hurricanes. The bill also required the NOAA to deliver five reports to Congress every year on hurricane-mitigation methods, and to produce a one-time study on the effects of using nuclear bombs to alter severe weather. The bill did not have a Senate cosponsor and died in committee, never becoming law.

== See also ==
- Project Stormfury § Project Cirrus, an attempt to modify a hurricane with cloud seeding
- 1953 Flint–Beecher tornado, the occurrence of which was briefly suggested to be connected with atomic bomb testing
