= Vincent Schaefer =

American chemist and meteorologist

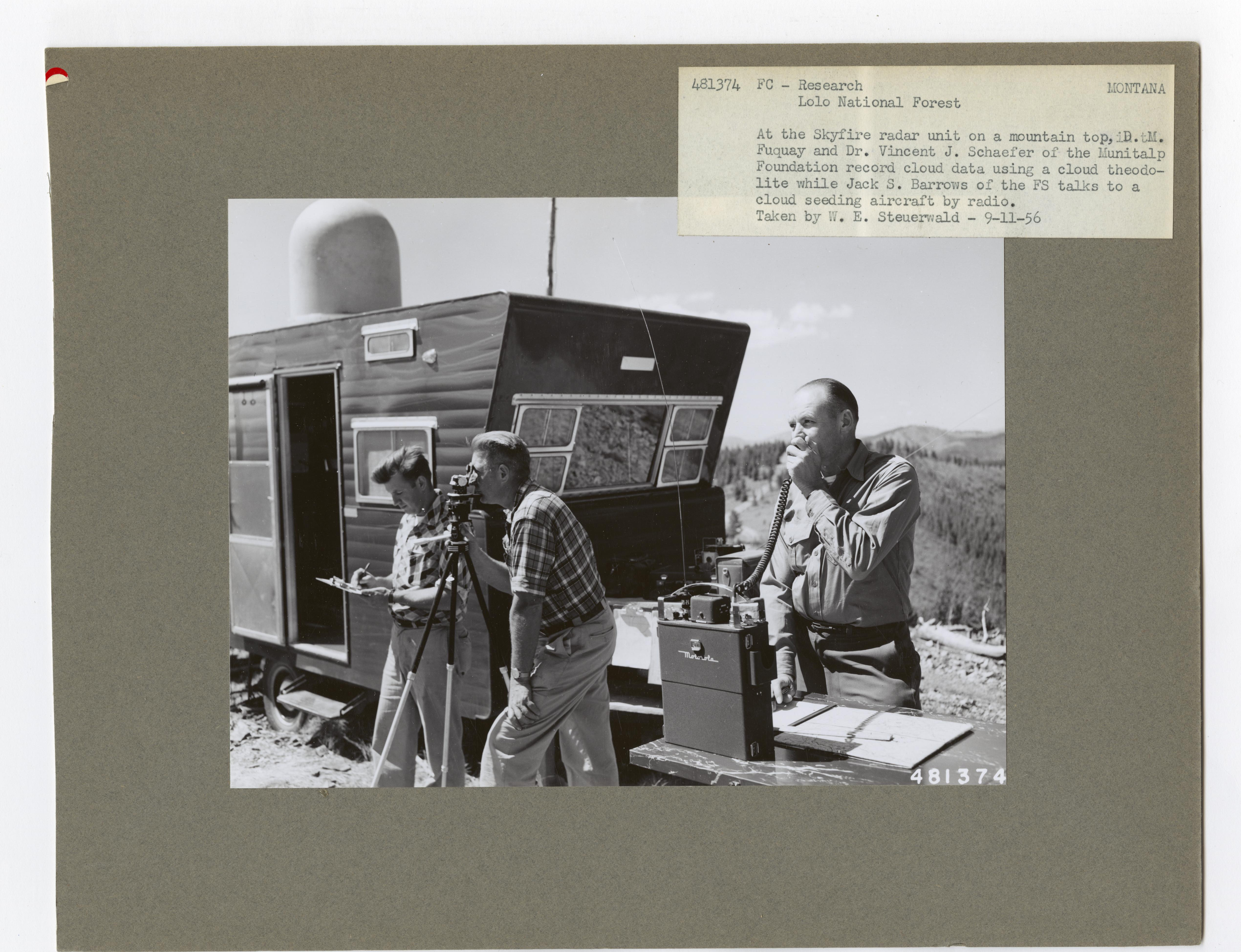
- Vincent Schaefer
- Born: July 4, 1906
- Died: July 25, 1993 (aged 87)
- Known for: cloud seeding
- Scientific career
- Fields: chemistry meteorology

Vincent Joseph Schaefer (July 4, 1906 – July 25, 1993) was an American chemist and meteorologist who developed cloud seeding. On November 13, 1946, while a researcher at the General Electric Research Laboratory, Schaefer modified clouds in the Berkshire Mountains by seeding them with dry ice. While he was self-taught and never completed high school, he was issued 14 patents.

== Personal life ==
Vincent J. Schaefer was the oldest son of Peter Aloysius Schaefer and Rose Agnes (Holtslag) Schaefer. He had two younger brothers, Paul and Carl, and two younger sisters, Gertrude and Margaret.

The Schaefer family lived in Schenectady, New York, and due to his mother's health, starting in 1921 the family made summer trips to the Adirondack Mountains. Vincent Schaefer had a lifelong association with the Adirondacks, as well as interests in hiking, natural history, and archeology. In his youth he was the founder of a local tribe of the Lone Scouts and with some of his tribe mates wrote and printed a tribe paper called "Archaeological Research." Schaefer credited this publication with his introduction to many prominent individuals in the Schenectady area, including Dr. Willis Rodney Whitney of the General Electric Research Laboratory.

During the late 1920s and early 1930s, Schaefer built up his personal library on natural history, science, and his other areas of interest and read a great deal. He also organized groups with those who shared his many interests — the Mohawk Valley Hiking Club in 1929, the Van Epps-Hartley Chapter of the New York Archaeological Association in 1931, and the Schenectady Wintersport Club (which established snow trains to ski slopes in the Adirondacks) in 1933–34. In 1931 Schaefer began work on creating the Long Path of New York (a hiking trail beginning near New York City and ending at Whiteface Mountain in the Adirondacks). During this period Schaefer also created adult education programs on natural history topics which gave him opportunities to speak in the community. Through these many activities Schaefer continued to expand his acquaintances, including John S. Apperson, an engineer at General Electric and a devout conservationist of the Adirondacks. Apperson introduced Schaefer to Irving Langmuir, a scientist at the GE Research Laboratory who was awarded a Nobel Prize in 1932 for his work in surface chemistry. Among other things, Langmuir shared Schaefer's love of skiing and the outdoors.

During his retirement, Schaefer worked with photographer John Day on A Field Guide to the Atmosphere (1981), a publication in the Peterson Field Guide series. In addition to continuing his consulting work, Schaefer was in a position to devote much more of his time to some of his lifelong interests such as environmental issues, natural and local history. This included the writing of numerous articles and the delivering of many presentations concerning the natural environment of upstate New York and the human impact on it. He also devoted much of his time to the fight for the preservation of many wilderness areas and parks, such as the Mohonk Preserve, Vroman's Nose, and the Great Flats Aquifer. Schaefer's long-term interest in Dutch barns made it possible for him to assume the editorship of Dutch Barn Miscellany for a time and to build a scale model of a Dutch barn. He also did a lot of research on the original settler families of the Schenectady and Mohawk Valley areas. During his retirement, Schaefer reflected on his extraordinary life preparing timelines, an unpublished autobiography, and indexes to some of his research notebooks and film collections. Schaefer also attended to the disposition of his papers and library. He also worked on a project he entitled "Ancient Windows of the Earth." This involved the slicing of rocks thinly so as to create a translucent effect. When he mounted such pieces on lampshades or other objects, it created a stained-glass window effect from natural rock highlighting the rock's geologic history. As part of this project, Schaefer designed and built a 6' diameter window in memory of his parents for the Saint James Church in North Creek in the Adirondacks.

Schaefer married Lois Perret on July 27, 1935. Until their deaths they lived on Schermerhorn Road in Schenectady, in a house Schaefer built with his brothers, which they called Woestyne South. Woestyne North was the name the Schaefers gave to their camp in the Adirondacks. The Schaefers had three children, Susan, Katherine, and James.

== Professional career ==
=== General Electric ===
In 1922, Schaefer's parents asked him to leave high school and go to work to supplement the family income. On the advice of his maternal uncles, Schaefer joined a four-year apprentice machinist course at General Electric. During the second year of his apprenticeship, Schaefer was granted a one-month leave to accompany Dr. Arthur C. Parker, New York State Archaeologist, on an expedition to central New York. As Schaefer was concluding the apprentice course in 1926 he was assigned to work at the machine shop at the General Electric Research Laboratory, where he worked for a year as a journeyman toolmaker.

Somewhat discouraged by the work of a toolmaker, Schaefer sought to satisfy a desire to work outdoors and to travel by joining, initially through a correspondence course, the Davey Institute of Tree Surgery in Kent, Ohio, in 1927. After a brief period working in Michigan, Schaefer asked to be transferred back to the Schenectady area and for a while worked as an independent landscape gardener. Upon the advice of Robert Palmer, Superintendent of the GE Research Laboratory, in 1929 Schaefer declined an opportunity to enter into a partnership for a plant nursery and instead rejoined the machine shop at the Research Laboratory, this time as a model maker.

At the Research Laboratory machine shop, Schaefer built equipment for Langmuir and his research associate, Katharine B. Blodgett. In 1932, Langmuir asked Schaefer to become his research assistant. Schaefer accepted and in 1933 began his research work with Langmuir, Blodgett, Whitney, and others at the Research Lab and throughout the General Electric organization. With Langmuir, Blodgett and others as well as by himself, Schaefer published many reports on the areas he studied, which included surface chemistry techniques, electron microscope techniques, polarization, the affinity of ice for various surfaces, protein and other monolayers, studies of protein films, television tube brightness, and submicroscopic particulates. An example of Scaefer's lasting contribution to surface science is the description in 1938 of a technique developed by him and Langmuir (later known as the Langmuir–Schaefer method) for the controlled transfer of a monolayer to a substrate, a modification of the Langmuir–Blodgett method.

After his promotion to research associate in 1938, Schaefer continued to work closely with Langmuir on the many projects Langmuir obtained through his involvement on national advisory committees, particularly related to military matters in the years immediately before and during the Second World War. This work included research on gas mask filtration of smokes, submarine detection with binaural sound, and the formation of artificial fogs using smoke generators—a project which reached fruition at Vrooman's Nose in the Schoharie Valley with a demonstration for military observers.

During his years as Langmuir's assistant, Langmuir allowed and encouraged Schaefer to carry on his own research projects. As an example of this, in 1940, Schaefer became known in his own right for the development of a method to make replicas of individual snowflakes using a thin plastic coating. This discovery brought him national publicity in popular magazines and an abundance of correspondence from individuals, including many students, seeking to replicate his procedure.

In 1943, the focus of Schaefer's and Langmuir's research shifted to precipitation static, aircraft icing, ice nuclei, and cloud physics, and many of their experiments were carried out at Mount Washington Observatory in New Hampshire. In the summer of 1946, Schaefer found his experimental "cold box" too warm for some laboratory tests he wanted to perform. Determined to get on with his work, he located some "dry ice" (solid CO_{2}) and placed it into the bottom of the "cold box." Creating a cloud with his breath he observed a sudden and heretofore unseen bluish haze that suddenly turned into millions of microscopic ice crystals that dazzled him in the strobe lit chamber. He had stumbled onto the very principle that was hidden in all previous experiments—the stimulating effect of a sudden change in heat/cold, humidity, in supercooled water spontaneously producing billions of ice nuclei. Through scores of repeated experiments he quickly developed a method to "seed" supercooled clouds with dry ice.

In November 1946, Schaefer conducted a successful field test seeding a natural cloud by airplane—with dramatic ice and snow effect. The resulting publicity brought an abundance of new correspondence, this time from people and businesses making requests for snow and water as well as scientists around the world also working on weather modification to change local weather conditions for the better. Schaefer's discovery also led to debates over the appropriateness of tampering with nature through cloud seeding. In addition, the successful field test enabled Langmuir to obtain federal funding to support additional research in cloud seeding and weather modification by the GE Research Laboratory. Schaefer was coordinator of the laboratory portion of Project Cirrus while the Air Force and Navy supplied the aircraft and pilots to carry out field tests and to collect the data used at the Research Laboratory. Field tests were conducted in the Schenectady area as well as in Puerto Rico and New Mexico.

When the military pilots working on Project Cirrus were assigned to duties in connection with the Korean War, GE recommended that Project Cirrus be discontinued after comprehensive reports were prepared of the project and the discoveries made. The final Project Cirrus report was issued in March 1953.

=== Munitalp Foundation ===
While Project Cirrus was winding down, Schaefer was approached by Vernon Crudge on behalf of the trustees of the Munitalp Foundation to work on Munitalp's meteorological research program. For a time, Schaefer worked for both the Research Laboratory and Munitalp, and in 1954 he left the Research Laboratory to become the Director of Research of Munitalp. At Munitalp, Schaefer worked with the U.S. Forest Service at the Priest River Experimental Forest in northern Idaho with Harry T. Gisborne, noted fire researcher, on Project Skyfire, a program to determine the uses of cloud seeding to affect the patterns of lightning in thunderstorms (and the resulting forest fires started by lightning). Project Skyfire had its roots in an association between the Forest Service and Schaefer begun in the early days of Project Cirrus. While at Munitalp Schaefer also worked on developing a mobile atmospheric research laboratory and time-lapse films of clouds. Schaefer left Munitalp in 1958, turning down an offer to move with the Foundation to Kenya, but he remained an adviser to Munitalp for several years after that.

=== Scientific education ===
After leaving Munitalp, Schaefer's career turned towards scientific education, and let him put his belief in the power of experimentation and observation over book-learning into practice. He worked with the American Meteorological Society and Natural Science Foundation on an educational film program and to develop the Natural Sciences Institute summer programs which gave high school students the opportunity to work with scientists and on their own to do field research and experimentation. From 1959 to 1961, Schaefer was director of the Atmospheric Science Center at the Loomis School in Connecticut.

During the 1970s, he organized and led annual winter expeditions for 8-10 research scientists to Yellowstone National Park where massive amounts of supercooled clouds were produced by the many geysers, including Old Faithful. There at negative 20-50 Fahrenheit conditions enabled the assembled researchers to perform numerous experiments using dry ice, silver iodide to convert the supercooled water to ice crystals at ground level. Temperature and ice crystal formations allowed first-hand observation of the full range of halo and corona optical effects.

=== Atmospheric Sciences Research Center (ASRC), University at Albany, State University of New York ===
From 1962 to 1968, the NSI program was continued with Schaefer's directorship under the auspices of the Atmospheric Sciences Research Center (ASRC) at the State University of New York at Albany (as the University at Albany, State University of New York was then known). During this period, Schaefer also continued his consulting work for many companies, government agencies, and universities. These consulting activities spanned most of Schaefer's career, and extended beyond his retirement from ASRC in 1976.

Schaefer helped found ASRC in 1960 and served as its Director of Research until 1966 when he became Director. Schaefer brought highly qualified atmospheric science researchers to ASRC, many of whom he had met through his work at GE and Munitalp. Bernard Vonnegut, Raymond Falconer and Duncan Blanchard were all veterans of Project Cirrus who joined Schaefer at ASRC. During his years at ASRC, in addition to the NSI summer programs, Schaefer led annual research expeditions to Yellowstone National Park for atmospheric scientists to work in the outdoor laboratory it provided each January. In the 1970s, Schaefer's own research interests focused on solar energy, aerosols, gases, air quality, and pollution particles in the atmosphere. His work in some of these areas culminated in a three-part report on Air Quality on the Global Scale in 1978. In addition, during the 1970s, Schaefer was an instructor in the American Association for the Advancement of Science Chautauqua short courses for science teachers.

== Publications (selected) ==
- The presence of ozone, nitric acid, nitrogen dioxide and ammonia in the atmosphere, Atmospheric Sciences Research Center, State University of New York, 1978.
- The air quality patterns of aerosols on the global scale, Atmospheric Sciences Research Center, State University of New York, 1976.
- Hailstorms and hailstones of the western Great Plains, Smithsonian Institution, 1961.
- The possibilities of modifying lightning storms in the northern Rockies, Northern Rocky Mountain Forest & Range Experiment Station, 1949.
- Heat requirements for instruments and airfoils during icing storms on Mt. Washington, General Electric Research Laboratory, 1946.
- The Use of high speed model propellers for studying de-icing coatings at the Mt. Washington Observatory, General Electric Research Laboratory, 1946.
- The Liquid water content of summer clouds on the summit of Mt. Washington, General Electric Research Laboratory, 1946.
- The Preparation and use of water sensitive coatings for sampling cloud particles, General Electric Research Laboratory, 1946.
- A Heated, vaned pitot tube and a recorder for measuring air speed under severe icing conditions, General Electric Research Laboratory, 1946.
- Fossilizing snowflakes, 1941.
- Serendipity in Science: Twenty Years at Langmuir University, An Autobiography by Vincent J Schaefer, ScD, Compiled and Edited by Don Rittner, Square Circle Press, Voorheesville, NY 2013

(405 pages, 15 Chapters, illustrations and B/W photographs)

== Patents ==
- U.S. patent 2,108,616 Filed Apr 12, 1935-"Treatment of Materials"
- U.S. patent 2,264,892 Filed Dec 6, 1954-"Coating for Electric Devices"
- U.S. patent 2,352,976 Filed Apr 12, 1941-"Light-Dividing Element"
- U.S. patent 2,374,310 Filed Jun 27, 1941-"Method of Producing Solids of Desired Configuration"
- U.S. patent 2,374,311 Filed Jun 21, 1944-"Cathode Ray Tube"
- U.S. patent 2,437,963 Filed Mar 24, 1943-"Method and Apparatus for Producing Aerosols"(with Irving Langmuir)
- U.S. patent 2,492,768 Filed Sep 18, 1947-"Cloud Moisture Meter"
- U.S. patent 2,493,745 Filed Nov 5, 1947-"Method of Making Electrical Indicators of Mechanical Expansion"(with Katharine Blodgett)
- U.S. patent 2,527,230 Filed Jan 21, 1948-"Method of Crystal Formation and Precipitation"(with Bernard Vonnegut)
- U.S. patent 2,532,822 Filed Nov 18, 1947-"Electrical Moisture Meter"
- U.S. patent 2,570,867 Filed Jan 29, 1948-"Method of Crystal Formation and Precipitation"
- U.S. patent 2,589,983 Filed Nov 5, 1947-"Electrical Indicator of Mechanical Expansion"(with Katharine Blodgett)
- U.S. patent 2,721,495 Filed Mar 6, 1952-"Method and Apparatus for Detecting Minute Crystal Forming Particles"
- U.S. patent 2,924,535 Filed Dec 6, 1954-"Method of Depositing a Silver Film"
