= Weather modification in North America =

Weather modification in North America has been taking place since as far back as the 1950s. Programs related to this field have been authorized by the governments of both the United States and Canada.

== Alberta Hail Project ==
The Alberta Hail Project was a research project sponsored by the Alberta Research Council and Environment Canada to study hailstorm physics and dynamics in order to design and test means for suppressing hail. It ran from 1956 until 1985. The main instrument in this research was an S-band circularly polarized weather radar located at the Red Deer Industrial Airport in central Alberta, Canada.

== Project Stormfury ==
Project Stormfury was an attempt to weaken tropical cyclones by flying aircraft into them and seeding with silver iodide. The project was run by the United States Government from 1962 to 1983.

== In Southern California ==
Weather modification via cloud seeding has a long history in perennially dry Southern California. Santa Barbara County has been cloud seeding with both ground-based machines and dedicated cloud-seeding airplanes since the 1980s. In 2016, Los Angeles County rebooted its cloud seeding program (with ground-based machines) for the first time after 2002.

== Pumping up deep ocean waters to cool the surface ==
Pumping up colder deep ocean water in front of a tropical storm to cool the sea surface skin temperature could be a technique used to fight hurricanes in the Atlantic before they develop into major hurricanes.

It is purely speculative and difficult to realize since placing such pumps in the path of a hurricane would be difficult. Furthermore, any such project would need a large number of them to upwell enough water to cool a large enough sea surface area to have any effectiveness. That is without considering the large amount of energy required to run the pumps and its possible effects on the marine ecosystem.

== See also ==
- Weather modification
- List of weather modification projects in the United States during 2025
- Cloud seeding
- Wind shearing
- Sea surface temperature
- Deep ocean water – Cold, salty water deep below the surface of Earth's oceans
- Saharan air layer
