= Operation Popeye =

U.S. military cloud-seeding project in Vietnam (1967–1972)

Operation Popeye / Sober Popeye (Project Controlled Weather Popeye / Motorpool / Intermediary-Compatriot) was a military cloud-seeding project carried out by the U.S. Air Force during the Vietnam War in 1967–1972. The highly classified program attempted to extend the monsoon season over specific areas of the Ho Chi Minh Trail, to disrupt North Vietnamese military supplies by softening road surfaces and causing landslides.

The chemical weather modification program was conducted from Thailand over Cambodia, Laos, and Vietnam and allegedly sponsored by Secretary of State Henry Kissinger and the CIA without the authorization of then Secretary of Defense Melvin Laird, who had categorically denied to Congress that a program for modification of the weather for use as a tactical weapon even existed.

== Build up ==
A report titled Rainmaking in SEASIA outlines use of lead iodide and silver iodide deployed by aircraft in a program that was developed in California at Naval Air Weapons Station China Lake and tested in Okinawa, Guam, the Philippines, Texas, and Florida in a hurricane study program called Project Stormfury.

== Objectives ==
Operation Popeye's goal was to increase rainfall in carefully selected areas to deny the Vietnamese enemy, namely military supply trucks, the use of roads by:

1. Softening road surfaces
2. Causing landslides along roadways
3. Washing out river crossings
4. Maintaining saturated soil conditions beyond the normal time span.

The goal of the operation was to extend days of rainfall by about 30 to 45 days each monsoon season.

== Implementation ==
The 54th Weather Reconnaissance Squadron carried out the operation using the slogan "make mud, not war." Starting on 20 March 1967, and continuing through every rainy season (March to November) in Southeast Asia until 1972, operational cloud seeding missions were flown. Three C-130 Hercules aircraft and two F-4C Phantom aircraft based at Udon Thani Royal Thai Air Force Base in Thailand flew two sorties per day. The aircraft were officially on weather reconnaissance missions and the aircraft crews as part of their normal duty also generated weather report data. The crews, all from the 54th Weather Reconnaissance Squadron, were rotated into the operation on a regular basis from Guam. Inside the squadron, the rainmaking operations were code-named "Motorpool".

== Public revelation ==
Reporter Jack Anderson published a story in March 1971 concerning Operation Popeye (though in his column, it was called Intermediary-Compatriot). The name Operation Popeye (Pop Eye) entered the public space through a brief mention in the Pentagon Papers and a 3 July 1972, article in the New York Times.

== See also ==
- List of United States government meteorology research projects
- Project Stormfury
- Weather warfare
- Weather modification
- WC-130 Hercules

== Sources ==
- Weather Modification Hearing, United States Senate Subcommittee on Oceans and International Environment of the Committee on Foreign Relations, March 20, 1974

=== Published government documents ===
- Keefer, Edward C. Foreign Relations of the United States 1964–1968, Volume XXVII, Laos United States Government Printing Office, 1998.
