= Beijing Weather Modification Office =

Chinese cloud seeding organization

- Traditional Chinese: 北京市人工影響天氣辦公室
- Simplified Chinese: 北京市人工影响天气办公室
Transcriptions
Standard Mandarin
- Hanyu Pinyin: Běijīngshì Réngōng Yíngxiǎng Tiānqì Bàngōngshì

The Beijing Weather Modification Office is a unit of the Beijing Meteorological Bureau tasked with weather control in Beijing, and its surrounding areas, including parts of Hebei and Inner Mongolia.

The Beijing Weather Modification Office form a part of China's nationwide weather control effort, believed to be the world's largest; it employs 37,000 people nationwide, who seed clouds by firing rockets and shells loaded with silver iodide into them. According to Zhang Qiang, head of the Office, cloud seeding increased precipitation in Beijing by about one-eighth in 2004; nationwide, similar efforts added 210 cubic kilometres (7.4×10^{12} cu ft) of rain between 1995 and 2003.

The work of the Office is largely aimed at hail storm prevention or making rain to end droughts; they have also induced precipitation for purposes of firefighting or counteracting the effect of severe dust storms, as they did in the aftermath of one storm in April 2006 which dropped 300,000 tonnes of dust and sand on the city and was believed to have been the largest in five years. Their technology was also used to create snow on New Year's Day in 1997. Other proposed future uses for induced precipitation include lowering temperatures in summer, in hopes of reducing electricity consumption. More prominently, they were enlisted by the Chinese government to ensure that the 2008 Summer Olympics were free of rain, by breaking up clouds headed towards the capital and forcing them to drop rain on outlying areas instead. The office created a snowstorm in November 2009.
