= AeroGroup =

Private military aircraft training company

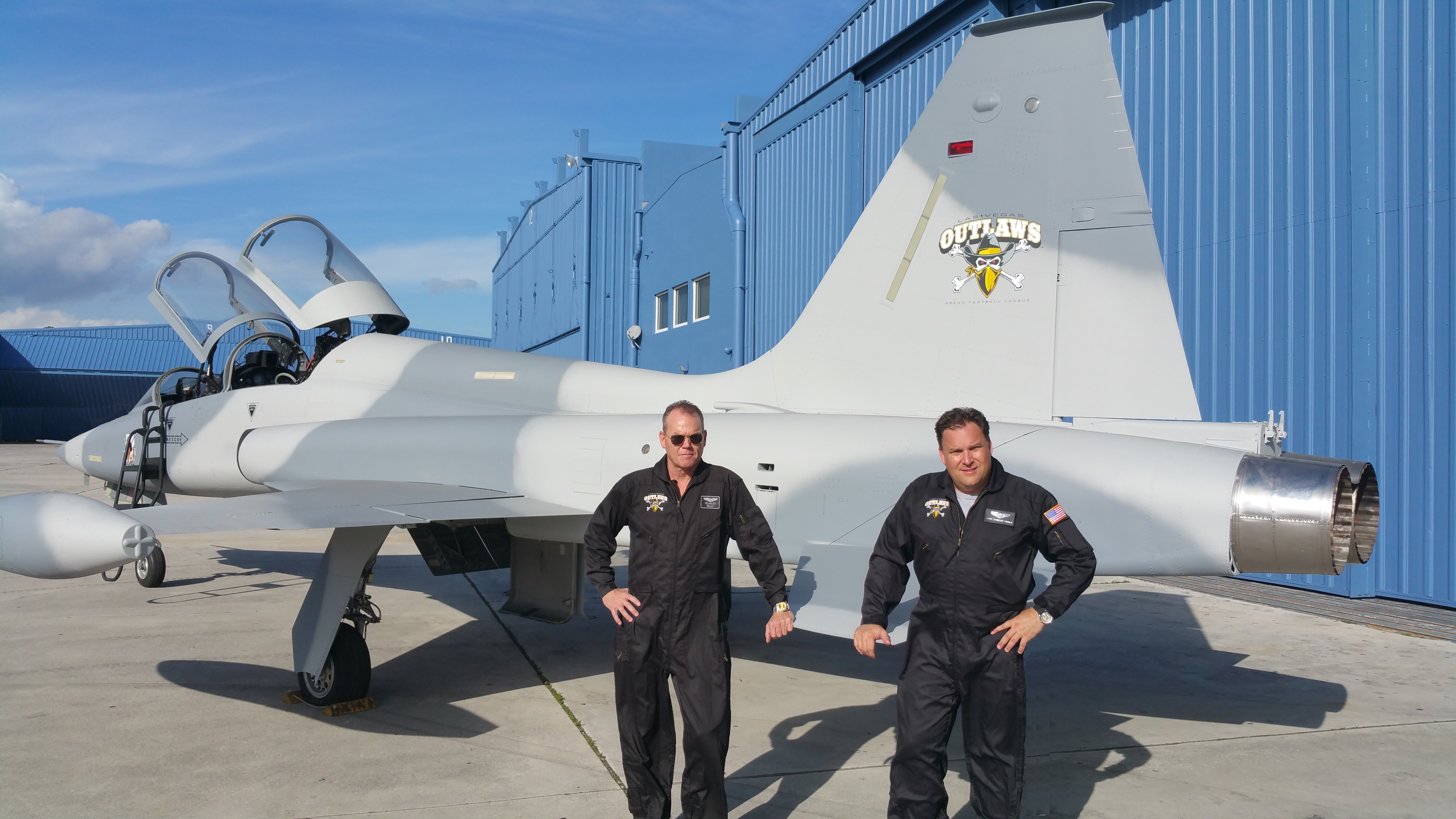
Mark Daniels and Victor Miller's F-5 aircraft

AeroGroup is an American private commercial company that offers military aircraft training. It was the first private commercial company to operate F-16 aircraft and train F-16 pilots and maintenance crew. AeroGroup performed F-16 training services and support for the Dutch, Italian and Belgian Air Forces. AeroGroup also possess and operates the Northrop F-5 (CF-5B) as a fighter lead-in aircraft for training and for other support services. There were 17 aircraft originally purchased from the Canadian Government with U.S. State Department approval and then imported into the US in 2006. AeroGroup was founded in 1999 by Mark Daniels and Victor Miller who have owned and operated numerous ex-military tactical aircraft such as the F-5, T-38, F-16, Harrier, Hawker Hunter Mk58, F-6, T-8, MiG-21, SU-25, L-39, B-57, IL-78, Strikemaster, TA-4J, A-4C, A-4L and A-4N aircraft. In 2006, Tactical Air Defense Services Inc. (TADS) acquired Aerogroup Inc.
