= Weather warfare =

Use of weather modification techniques for military purposes

Weather warfare is the use of weather modification techniques such as cloud seeding for military purposes.

== History ==
Prior to the Environmental Modification Convention signed in Geneva in 1977, the United States used weather warfare in the Vietnam War. Operation Popeye saw the use of cloud seeding over the Ho Chi Minh trail. It was hoped that the increased rainfall would reduce the rate of infiltration down the trail.

A research paper produced for the United States Air Force written in 1996 speculates about the future use of nanotechnology to produce "artificial weather", clouds of microscopic computer particles all communicating with each other to form an "intelligent fog" that could be used for various purposes. "Artificial weather technologies do not currently exist. But as they are developed, the importance of their potential applications rises rapidly."

The Environmental Modification Convention (ENMOD), which was signed in Geneva on May 18, 1977, and entered into force on October 5, 1978, prohibits "widespread, long-lasting or severe effects as the means of destruction, damage or injury". In 1972 an ENMOD convention on weather warfare presented that this permits "local, non-permanent changes". The "Consultative Committee of Experts" established in Article VIII of the Convention stated in their "Understanding relating to Article II" that any use of environmental modification where this is done "as a means of destruction, damage or injury to another State Party, would be prohibited.". It also suggests all signatories are expected to abstain from using weather modification to cause harm at any scale, stating "military or any other hostile use of environmental modification techniques, would result, or could reasonably be expected to result, in widespread, long-lasting or severe destruction, damage or injury." However, the treaty does not directly condemn military use of weather modification when it does not directly cause harm, such as the United States' use of weather modification in the Battle of Khe Sanh in the Vietnam War. The limitations of the treaty, and its application only to signatory states, allow weather warfare to continue to play a role in warfare throughout the 21st century. The United States prohibits weather modification without permission of the United States Secretary of Commerce.

== See also ==
- Weather Modification Operations and Research Board
- List of United States government meteorology research projects
