= Hail cannon =

Device claimed to stop hail

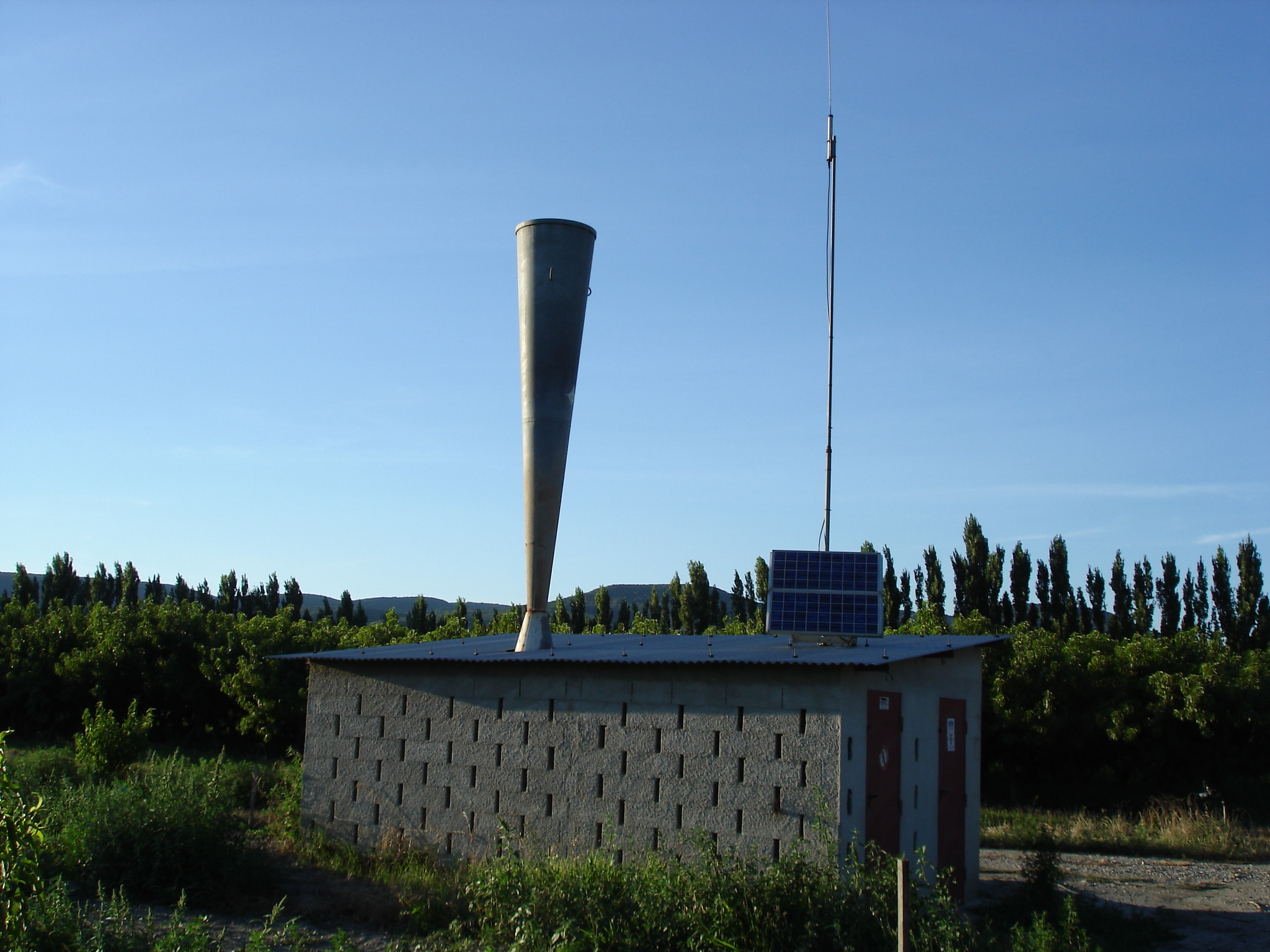
Hail cannon in 2007

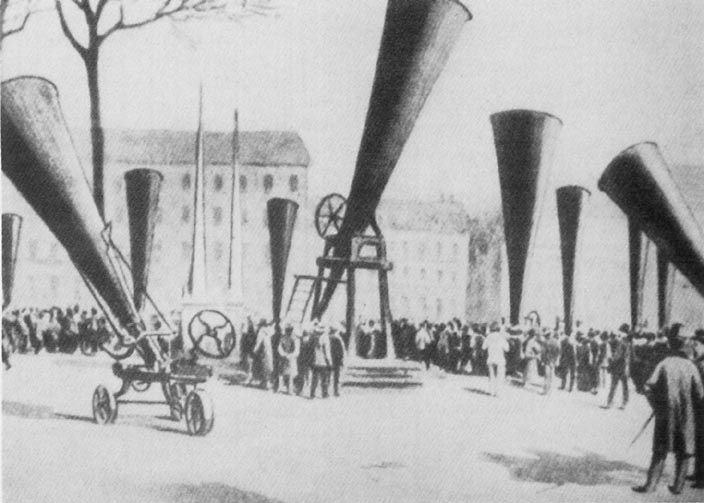
Hail cannons in 1901

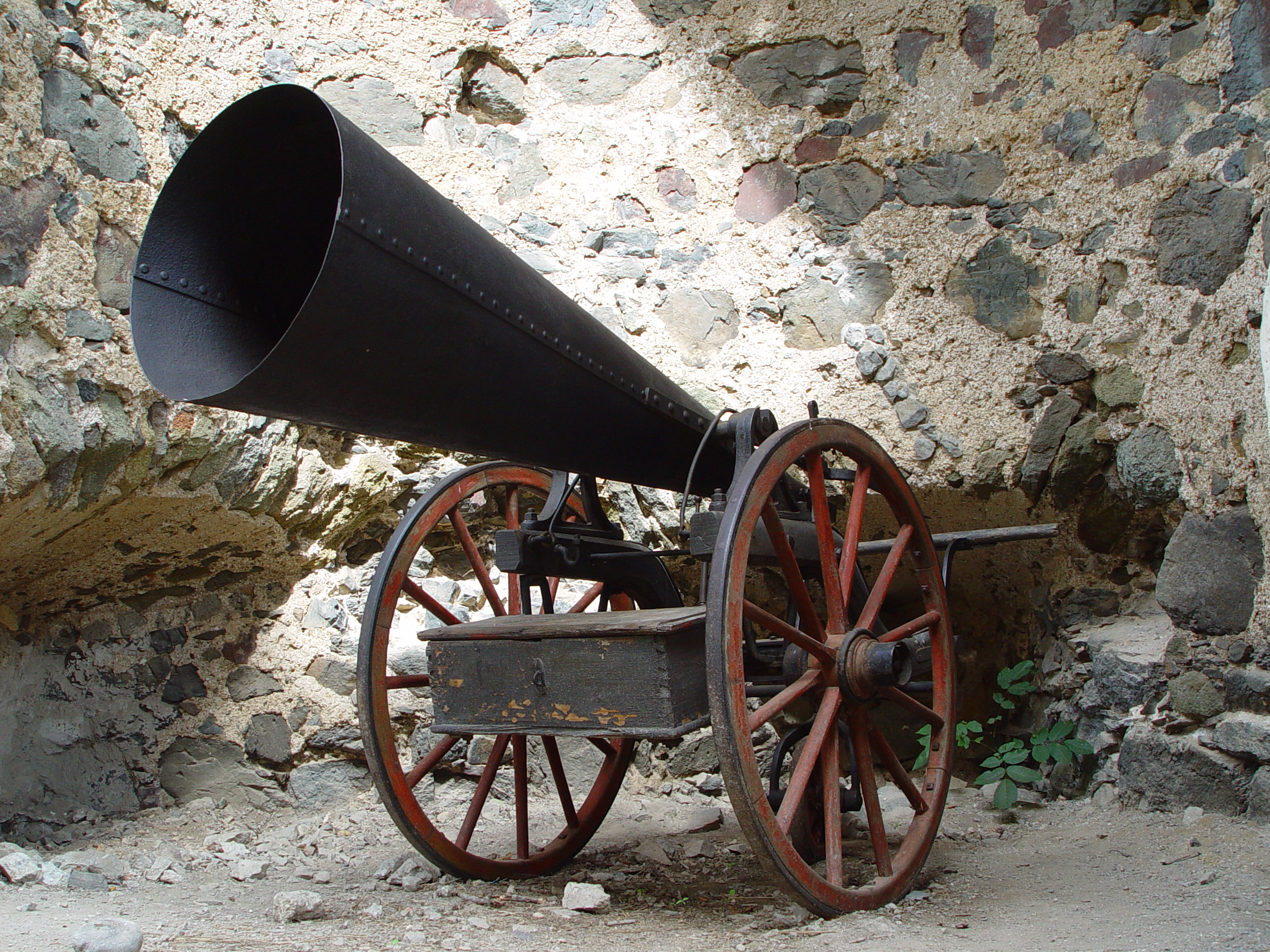
Hail cannon in Banská Štiavnica Old Castle (Slovakia). Probably designed by Julius Sokol

A hail cannon is a shock wave generator claimed to disrupt the formation of hailstones in the atmosphere.

These devices frequently engender conflict between farmers and neighbors when used, because they are loudly and repeatedly fired every 1 to 10 seconds while a storm is approaching and until it has passed through the area, yet there is no scientific evidence for their effectiveness.

== Historical use ==
In the French wine-growing regions, church-bells were traditionally rung in the face of oncoming storms and later replaced by firing rockets or cannons.

== Modern systems ==
A mixture of acetylene and oxygen is ignited in the lower chamber of the machine. As the resulting blast passes through the neck and into the cone, it develops into a shock wave. This shock wave then travels through the cloud formations above, a disturbance which manufacturers claim disrupts the growth phase of hailstones.

Manufacturers claim that what would otherwise have fallen as hailstones then falls as slush or rain. It is said to be critical that the machine is running during the approach of the storm in order to affect the developing hailstones. One manufacturer claims that the radius of the effective area of their device is around 500 m (1,600 ft).

== Lack of scientific evidence ==
There is no evidence in favor of the effectiveness of these devices. A 2006 review by Jon Wieringa and Iwan Holleman in the journal Meteorologische Zeitschrift summarized a variety of negative and inconclusive scientific measurements, concluding "the use of cannons or explosive rockets is a waste of money and effort".

There is also reason to doubt the efficacy of hail cannons from a theoretical perspective. For example, thunder is a much more powerful sonic wave, and is usually found in the same storms that generate hail, yet it does not seem to disturb the growth of hailstones. Similarly, hail cannons are placed at ground level, while hail formation occurs at altitudes above 10,000 meters; a device with an effective range of 500 meters, above, would be unlikely to have an impact at an elevation 20 times higher. Charles Knight, a cloud physicist at the National Center for Atmospheric Research in Boulder, Colorado, said in a July 10, 2008, newspaper article that "I don't find anyone in the scientific community who would validate hail cannons, but there are believers in all sorts of things. It would be very hard to prove they don't work, weather being as unpredictable as it is."

== See also ==
- Cloud seeding
- Cloudbuster
- Pseudoscience
