= Sea surface skin temperature =

Quantity in oceanography

The sea surface skin temperature (SST_{skin}), or ocean skin temperature, is the temperature of the sea surface as determined through its infrared spectrum (3.7–12 μm) and represents the temperature of the sublayer of water at a depth of 10–20 μm. High-resolution data of skin temperature gained by satellites in passive infrared measurements is a crucial constituent in determining the sea surface temperature (SST).

Since the skin layer is in radiative equilibrium with the atmosphere and the sun, its temperature underlies a daily cycle. Even small changes in the skin temperature can lead to large changes in atmospheric circulation. This makes skin temperature a widely used quantity in weather forecasting and climate science.

== Remote Sensing ==
Large-scale sea surface skin temperature measurements started with the use of satellites in remote sensing. The underlying principle of this kind of measurement is to determine the surface temperature via its black body spectrum. Different measurement devices are installed where each device measures a different wavelength. Every wavelength corresponds to different sublayers in the upper 500 μm of the ocean water column. Since this layer shows a strong temperature gradient, the observed temperature depends on the wavelength used. Therefore, the measurements are often indicated with their wavelength band instead of their depths.

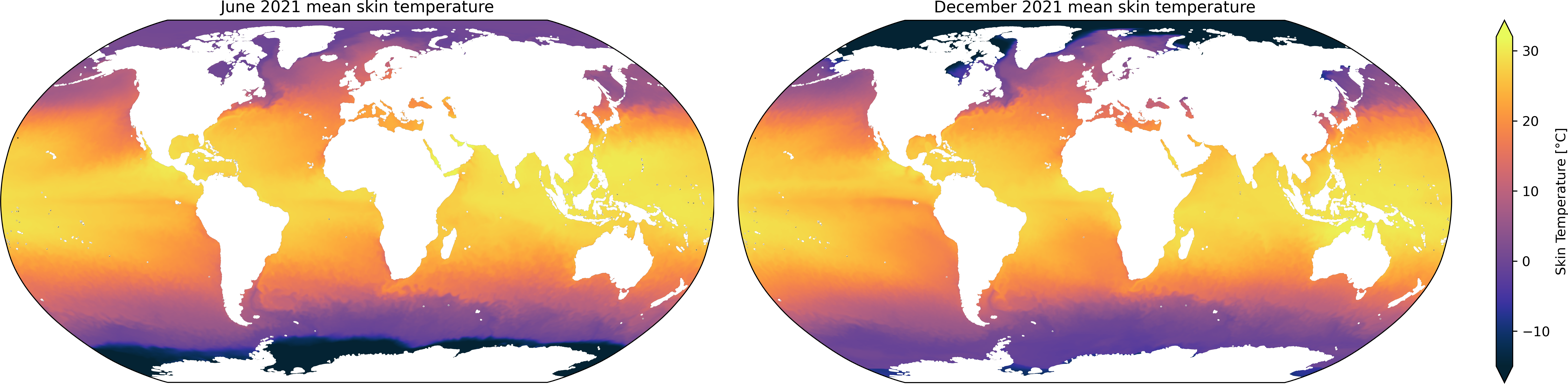
Figure 1: Mean sea surface skin temperature in December and June 2021 in °C as determined through the ERA5 reanalysis dataset.

=== History ===
First satellite measurements of the sea surface were conducted as early as 1964 by Nimbus-I. Further satellites were deployed in 1966 and the early 1970s. Early measurements suffered from contamination by atmospheric disturbances. The first satellite to carry a sensor operating on multiple infrared bands was launched late in 1978, which enabled atmospheric correction. This class of sensors is called Advanced very-high-resolution radiometers (AVHRR) and provides information that is also relevant for the tracking of clouds. The current, third-generation features six channels at wavelength ranges important for cloud observation, cloud/snow differentiation, surface temperature observation and atmospheric correction. The modern satellite array is able to give a global coverage with a resolution of 10 km every ~6 h.

=== Conversion to SST ===
Sea surface skin temperature measurements are completed with SST_{subskin} measurements in the microwave regime to estimate the sea surface temperature. These measurements have the advantage of being independent of cloud cover and underlie less variation. The conversion to SST is done via elaborate retrieval algorithms. These algorithms take additional information like the current wind, cloud cover, precipitation and water vapor content into account and model the heat transfer between the layers. The determined SST is validated by in-situ measurements from ships, buoys and profilers. On average, the skin temperature is estimated to be systematically cooler by 0.15 ± 0.1 K compared to the temperature at 5m depth.

== Vertical temperature profile of the sea surface ==
The vertical temperature profile of the surface layer of the ocean is determined by different heat transport processes. At the very interface, the ocean is in thermal equilibrium with the atmosphere which is dominated by conductive and diffusive heat transfer. Also, evaporation takes place at the interface and thus cools the skin layer. Below the skin layer lies the subskin layer, this layer is defined as the layer where molecular and viscous heat transfer dominates. At larger scales, as the much bigger foundation layer, turbulent heat transport through eddies contributes most to the vertical heat transfer.

During the day, there is additional heating by the sun. The solar radiation entering the ocean gets heats the surface following the Beer-Lambert law. Here, approximately five percent of the incoming radiation is absorbed in the upper 1 mm of the ocean. Since the heating from above leads to a stable stratification, other processes dominate the heat transport, depending on the considered scale.

Layer	Depth	Dominating heat transport	Measurement
Sea surface interface (SST_{int})	-	Conductive, diffusive heat transfer	-
Sea surface skin layer (SST_{skin})	~10-20 μm	Conductive, diffusive heat transfer	Infrared radiometry
Sea surface subskin layer (SST_{subskin})	~1-1.5 mm	Molecular& viscous heat transfer	Microwave radiometry
Sea surface foundation temperature (SST_{fnd})	~1–5 m	Turbulent heat transport	Direct measurements (buoys, ships, profilers)

Regarding the skin layer with thickness $\delta$, turbulent diffusion term $K_w$ is negligible. For the stationary case without external heating, the vertical temperature profile obeys the following energy budget:

$\rho_wc_wk_w\frac{\partial T}{\partial z}=Q=LH+SH+LW,$

Here, $\rho_w$ and $c_w$ denote the density and heat capacity of water, $k_w$ the molecular thermal conductivity and $\tfrac{\partial T}{\partial z}.$ the vertical partial derivative of the temperature. The vertical heat difference $Q$ consists of latent heat release, sensible heat fluxes and the net longwave thermal radiation. The $Q$ observed in the skin layer is positive, which corresponds to a temperature increasing with depth (Note that the z-axis points downward into the ocean). This leads to a cool skin layer as can be seen in Fig. 2. A common empiric description of the vertical temperature profile within the skin layer of depth $\delta$ is:

$\overline{T}(z)=T_b+(T_s-T_b)*e^{-z/\delta}$

Here, $T_s$ and $T_b$ denote the temperature of the surface and the lower boundary. When including the diurnal heating, we have to include an additional heating term, depending on the absorbed short wave radiation. Integrating over $z$, we can express the temperature at depth $\delta$ as:

$T_{z=\delta} =T_s -\frac{\delta}{\rho_wc_wk_w} (Q+R_sf_s)$

where $R_s$ is the net shortwave solar radiation at the ocean interface and $f_s$ is its fraction absorbed up to depth $\delta$. As can be seen in Fig. 2, the diurnal heating reduces the cool skin effect. The maximum temperature can be found in the subskin layer, where the external heating per depth is lower than in the skin layer, but where the surface cooling has a smaller effect. With further increasing depth, the temperature declines, as the proportional heating is smaller and the layer is mixed via turbulent processes.

== Variation of skin temperature ==
=== Daily cycle ===
The ocean skin temperature is defined as the temperature of the water at 20 μm depth. This means that the SST_{skin} is very dependent on the heat flux from the ocean to the atmosphere. This results in diurnal warming of the sea surface, high temperatures occur during the day and low temperatures during the night (especially with clear skies and low wind speed conditions).

Because the SST_{skin} can be measured by satellites and is the temperature almost at the interface of the ocean and the atmosphere, it is a very useful measure to find the heat flux from the ocean. The increased heat flux due to diurnal warming can reach as high as 50-60 W/m^{2} and has a temporal mean of 10 W/m^{2}. These amounts of heat flux cannot be neglected in atmospheric processes.

=== Wind and interaction with the atmosphere ===
The sea surface temperature is also highly dependent on wind and waves. Both processes cause mixing and therefore cooling/heating of the SST_{skin}. For example, when rough seas occur during the day, colder water from lower layers are mixed with the ocean skin. When gravity waves are present at the sea surface, there is a modulation of ocean skin temperature. In this modulation, the wind plays an important role. The magnitude of this modulation depends on wind speed, the phase is determined by the direction of the wind relative to the waves. When the wind and wave direction are similar, maximum temperatures occur on the forward side of the wave and when the wind blows from the opposite side compared to the waves, maximum temperatures are found at the rear face of the wave.

=== Interaction with marine lifeforms ===
On a global scale, skin temperature is an indicator of plankton concentrations. In areas where a relatively cold SST_{skin} is measured, abundance of phytoplankton is high. This effect is caused by the rise of cold, nutrient-rich water from the sea bottom in these regions. This increase in nutrients causes phytoplankton to thrive. On the other hand, relatively high SST_{skin} is an indication of higher zooplankton concentrations. These plankton depend on organic matter to thrive and higher temperatures increase production.

On more local scales, surface accumulations of cyanobacteria can cause local increases in SST_{skin} by up to 1.5 degrees Celsius. Cyanobacteria are bacteria that photosynthesize and therefore chlorophyll is present in these bacteria. This increased chlorophyll concentration causes more absorption of incoming radiation. This increased absorption causes the temperature of the sea surface to rise. This increased temperature is most likely only apparent in the first meter and definitely only in the first five meters, after which no increased temperatures are measured.

== See also ==
- Sea surface temperature
- Remote sensing
- Remote sensing (oceanography)
- Thermal radiation
- Skin temperature of an atmosphere
- Weather modification
