= Sea surface temperature =

Water temperature close to the ocean's surface

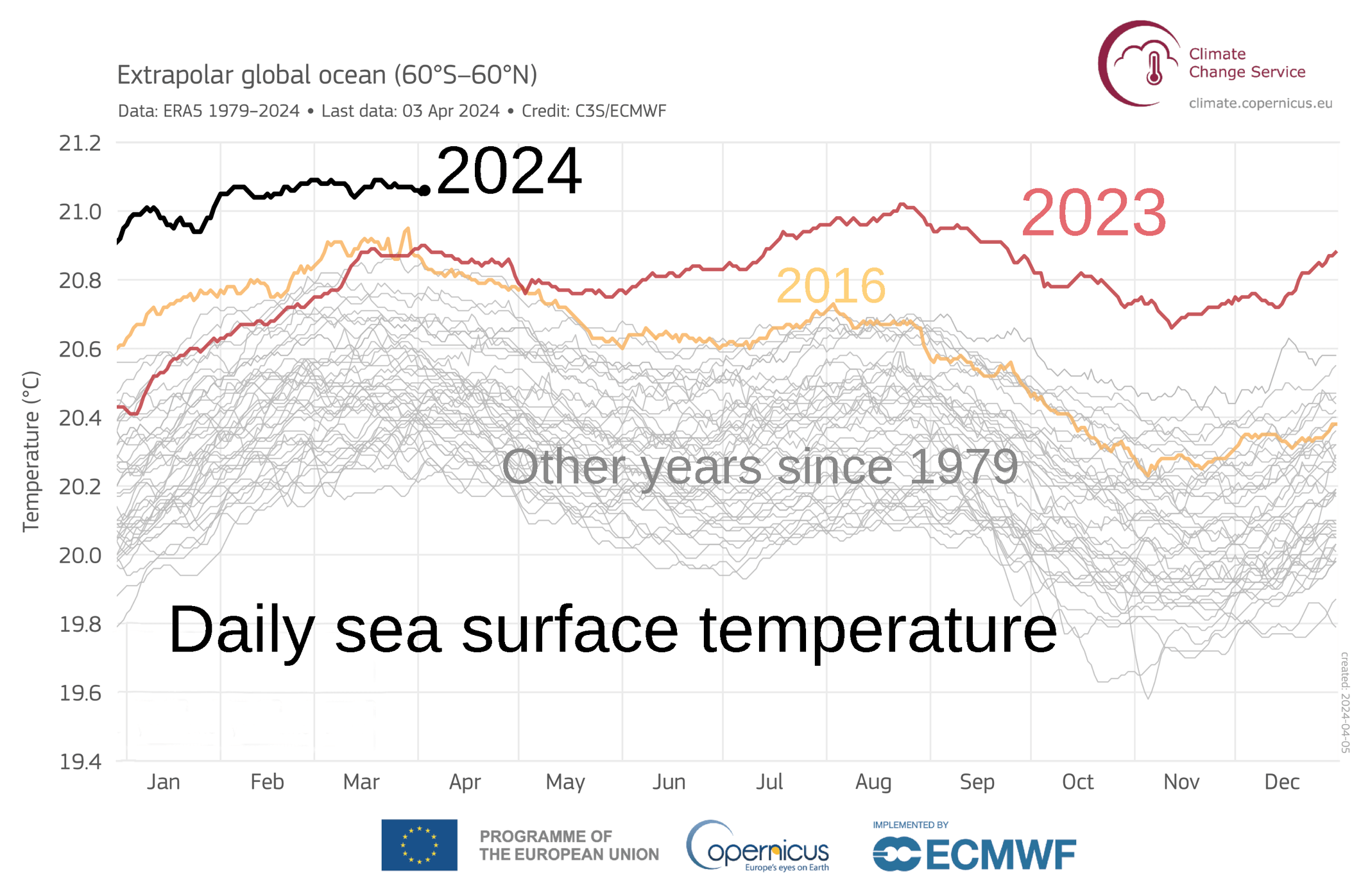
Sea-surface temperature since 1979 in the extrapolar region (between 60 degrees south and 60 degrees north latitude)

Sea surface temperature (or ocean surface temperature) is the temperature of ocean water close to the surface. The exact meaning of surface varies in the literature and in practice. It is usually between 1 millimetre (0.04 in) and 20 metres (70 ft) below the sea surface. Sea surface temperatures greatly modify air masses in the Earth's atmosphere within a short distance of the shore. The thermohaline circulation has a major impact on average sea surface temperature throughout most of the world's oceans.

Warm sea surface temperatures can develop and strengthen cyclones over the ocean. Tropical cyclones can also cause a cool wake. This is due to turbulent mixing of the upper 30 metres (100 ft) of the ocean. Sea surface temperature changes during the day. This is like the air above it, but to a lesser degree. There is less variation in sea surface temperature on breezy days than on calm days.

Coastal sea surface temperatures can cause offshore winds to generate upwelling, which can significantly cool or warm nearby landmasses, but shallower waters over a continental shelf are often warmer. Onshore winds can cause a considerable warm-up even in areas where upwelling is fairly constant, such as the northwest coast of South America. Coastal sea surface temperature values are important within numerical weather prediction as the sea surface temperature influences the atmosphere above, such as in the formation of sea breezes and sea fog.

It is very likely that global mean sea surface temperature increased by 0.88 °C between 1850–1900 and 2011–2020 due to global warming, with most of that warming (0.60 °C) occurring between 1980 and 2020. The temperatures over land are rising faster than ocean temperatures. This is because the ocean absorbs about 90% of excess heat generated by climate change.

== Definitions ==
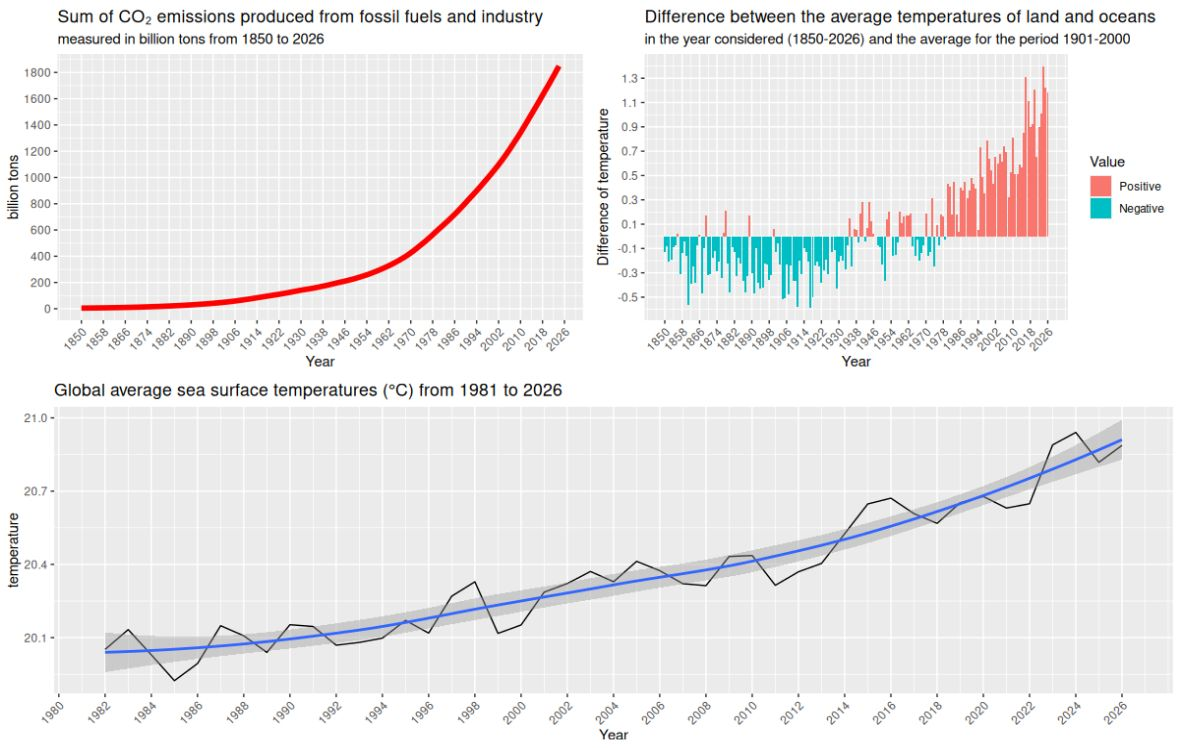
Source: ClimateReanalyzer, OurWorldInData

Sea surface temperature (SST), or ocean surface temperature, is the water temperature close to the ocean's surface. The exact meaning of surface varies according to the measurement method used, but it is between 1 millimetre (0.04 in) and 20 metres (70 ft) below the sea surface.

For comparison, the sea surface skin temperature relates to the top 20 or so micrometres of the ocean's surface.

The definition proposed by Intergovernmental Panel on Climate Change (IPCC) for sea surface temperature does not specify the number of metres but focuses more on measurement techniques: Sea surface temperature is "the subsurface bulk temperature in the top few metres of the ocean, measured by ships, buoys and drifters. [...] Satellite measurements of skin temperature (uppermost layer; a micrometre thick) in the infrared or the top centimetre or so in the microwave are also used, but must be adjusted to be compatible with the bulk temperature."

The temperature further below that is called ocean temperature or deeper ocean temperature. Ocean temperatures (more than 20 metres below the surface) also vary by region and time, and they contribute to variations in ocean heat content and ocean stratification. The increase of both ocean surface temperature and deeper ocean temperature is an important effect of climate change on oceans.

=== Extent of "surface" ===
The extent of the ocean surface down into the ocean is influenced by the amount of mixing that takes place between the surface water and the deeper water. This depends on the temperature: in the tropics the warm surface layer of about 100 m is quite stable and does not mix much with deeper water, while near the poles winter cooling and storms makes the surface layer denser and it mixes to great depth and then stratifies again in summer. This is why there is no simple single depth for ocean surface. The photic depth of the ocean is typically about 100 m and is related to this heated surface layer. It can be up to around 200 m deep in the open ocean.

== Variations and changes ==
Sea surface temperature and flows

=== Local variations ===
The sea surface temperature (SST) has a diurnal range, just like the Earth's atmosphere above, though to a lesser degree due to its greater thermal inertia. On calm days, the temperature can vary by 6 °C (10 °F). The temperature of the ocean at depth lags the Earth's atmosphere temperature by 15 days per 10 metres (33 ft), which means for locations like the Aral Sea, temperatures near its bottom reach a maximum in December and a minimum in May and June. Near the coastline, some offshore and longshore winds move the warm waters near the surface offshore, and replace them with cooler water from below in the process known as Ekman transport. This pattern generally increases nutrients for marine life in the region, and can have a profound effect in some regions where the bottom waters are particularly nutrient-rich. Offshore of river deltas, freshwater flows over the top of the denser seawater, which allows it to heat faster due to limited vertical mixing. Remotely sensed SST can be used to detect the surface temperature signature due to tropical cyclones. In general, an SST cooling is observed after the passing of a hurricane, primarily as the result of mixed layer deepening and surface heat losses. In the wake of several day long Saharan dust outbreaks across the adjacent northern Atlantic Ocean, sea surface temperatures are reduced 0.2 C to 0.4 C (0.3 to 0.7 F). Other sources of short-term SST fluctuation include extratropical cyclones, rapid influxes of glacial fresh water and concentrated phytoplankton blooms due to seasonal cycles or agricultural run-off.

The tropical ocean has been warming faster than other regions since 1950, with the greatest rates of warming in the tropical Indian Ocean, western Pacific Ocean, and western boundary currents of the subtropical gyres. However, the eastern Pacific Ocean, subtropical North Atlantic Ocean, and Southern Ocean have warmed more slowly than the global average or have experienced cooling since the 1950s.

==== Atlantic Multidecadal Oscillation ====
Ocean currents, such as the Atlantic Multidecadal Oscillation, can affect sea surface temperatures over several decades. The Atlantic Multidecadal Oscillation (AMO) is an important driver of North Atlantic SST and Northern Hemisphere climate, but the mechanisms controlling AMO variability remain poorly understood. Atmospheric internal variability, changes in ocean circulation, or anthropogenic drivers may control the multidecadal temperature variability associated with AMO. These changes in North Atlantic SST may influence winds in the subtropical North Pacific and produce warmer SSTs in the western Pacific Ocean.

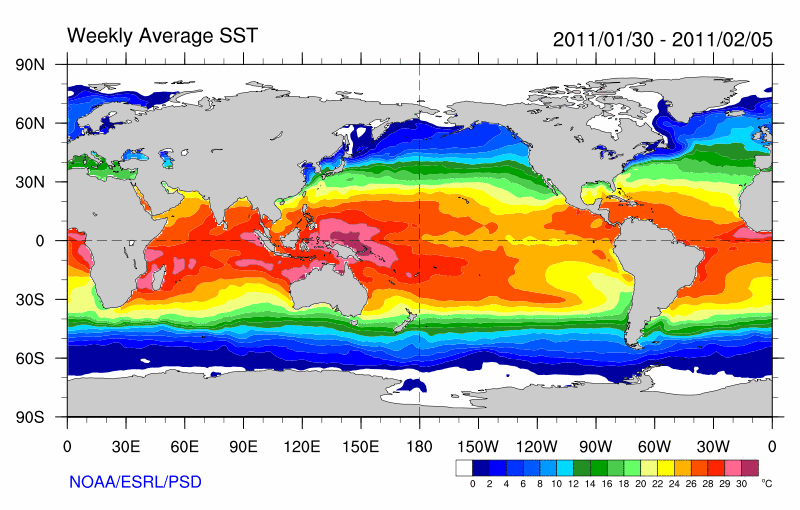
Weekly average sea surface temperature in the ocean during the first week of February 2011, during a period of La Niña.

=== Regional variations ===
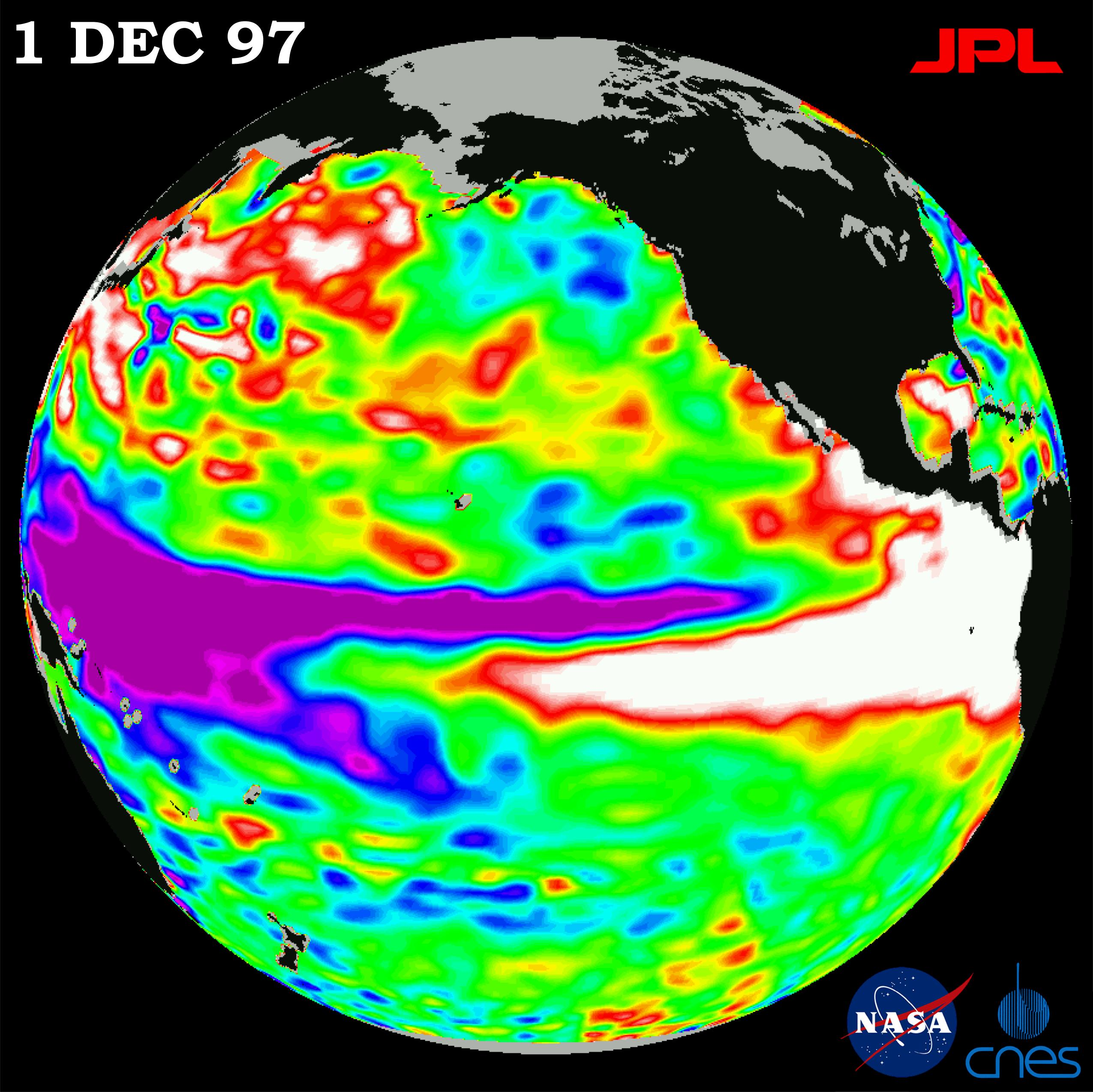
The 1997 El Niño observed by TOPEX/Poseidon. The white areas off the tropical coasts of South and North America indicate the pool of warm water.

El Niño is defined by prolonged differences in Pacific Ocean surface temperatures when compared with the average value. The accepted definition is a warming or cooling of at least 0.5 °C (0.9 °F) averaged over the east-central tropical Pacific Ocean. Typically, this anomaly happens at irregular intervals of 2–7 years and lasts nine months to two years. The average period length is 5 years. When this warming or cooling occurs for only seven to nine months, it is classified as El Niño/La Niña "conditions"; when it occurs for more than that period, it is classified as El Niño/La Niña "episodes".

The sign of an El Niño in the sea surface temperature pattern is when warm water spreads from the west Pacific and the Indian Ocean to the east Pacific. It takes the rain with it, causing extensive drought in the western Pacific and rainfall in the normally dry eastern Pacific. El Niño's warm rush of nutrient-poor tropical water, heated by its eastward passage in the Equatorial Current, replaces the cold, nutrient-rich surface water of the Humboldt Current. When El Niño conditions last for many months, extensive ocean warming and the reduction in Easterly Trade winds limits upwelling of cold nutrient-rich deep water and its economic impact to local fishing for an international market can be serious.

Among scientists, there is medium confidence that the tropical Pacific will transition to a mean pattern resembling that of El Niño on centennial time scale, but there is still high uncertainty in tropical Pacific SST projections because it is difficult to capture El Niño variability in climate models.

Surface air temperatures over land masses have been increasing faster than sea surface temperatures.

=== Recent increase due to climate change ===
The global average sea surface temperature has been increasing since around 1900 (graph showing annual average and 5-year smoothed average, relative to the average value for the years 1951-1980).

Overall, scientists project that all regions of the oceans will warm by 2050, but models disagree for SST changes expected in the subpolar North Atlantic, the equatorial Pacific, and the Southern Ocean. The future global mean SST increase for the period 1995-2014 to 2081-2100 is 0.86 °C under the most modest greenhouse gas emissions scenarios, and up to 2.89 °C under the most severe emissions scenarios.

A study published in 2025 in Environmental Research Letters reported that global mean sea surface temperature increases had more than quadrupled, from 0.06 K per decade during 1985–89 to 0.27 K per decade for 2019–23. The researchers projected that the increase inferred over the past 40 years would likely be exceeded within the next 20 years.

== Measurement ==
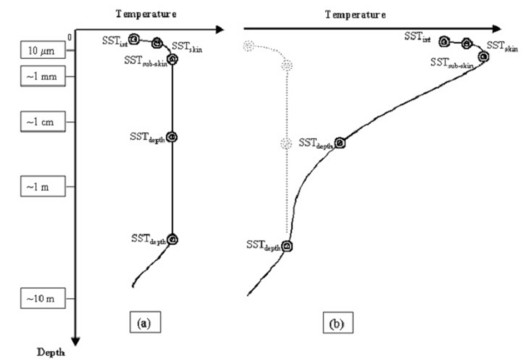
Temperature profile of the surface layer of the ocean (a) at night and (b) during the day

There are a variety of techniques for measuring this parameter that can potentially yield different results because different things are actually being measured. Away from the immediate sea surface, general temperature measurements are accompanied by a reference to the specific depth of measurement. This is because of significant differences encountered between measurements made at different depths, especially during the daytime when low wind speed and high sunshine conditions may lead to the formation of a warm layer at the ocean's surface and strong vertical temperature gradients (a diurnal thermocline). Sea surface temperature measurements are confined to the top portion of the ocean, known as the near-surface layer.

=== Thermometers ===
The sea surface temperature was one of the first oceanographic variables to be measured. Benjamin Franklin suspended a mercury thermometer from a ship while travelling between the United States and Europe in his survey of the Gulf Stream in the late eighteenth century. SST was later measured by dipping a thermometer into a bucket of water that was manually drawn from the sea surface. The first automated technique for determining SST was accomplished by measuring the temperature of water in the intake port of large ships, which was underway by 1963. These observations have a warm bias of around 0.6 °C (1 °F) due to the heat of the engine room.

Fixed weather buoys measure the water temperature at a depth of 3 metres (9.8 ft). Measurements of SST have had inconsistencies over the last 130 years due to the way they were taken. In the nineteenth century, measurements were taken in a bucket off a ship. However, there was a slight variation in temperature because of the differences in buckets. Samples were collected in either a wood or an uninsulated canvas bucket, but the canvas bucket cooled quicker than the wood bucket. The sudden change in temperature between 1940 and 1941 was the result of an undocumented change in procedure. The samples were taken near the engine intake because it was too dangerous to use lights to take measurements over the side of the ship at night.

Many different drifting buoys exist around the world that vary in design, and the location of reliable temperature sensors varies. These measurements are beamed to satellites for automated and immediate data distribution. A large network of coastal buoys in U.S. waters is maintained by the National Data Buoy Center (NDBC). Between 1985 and 1994, an extensive array of moored and drifting buoys was deployed across the equatorial Pacific Ocean designed to help monitor and predict the El Niño phenomenon.

=== Weather satellites ===
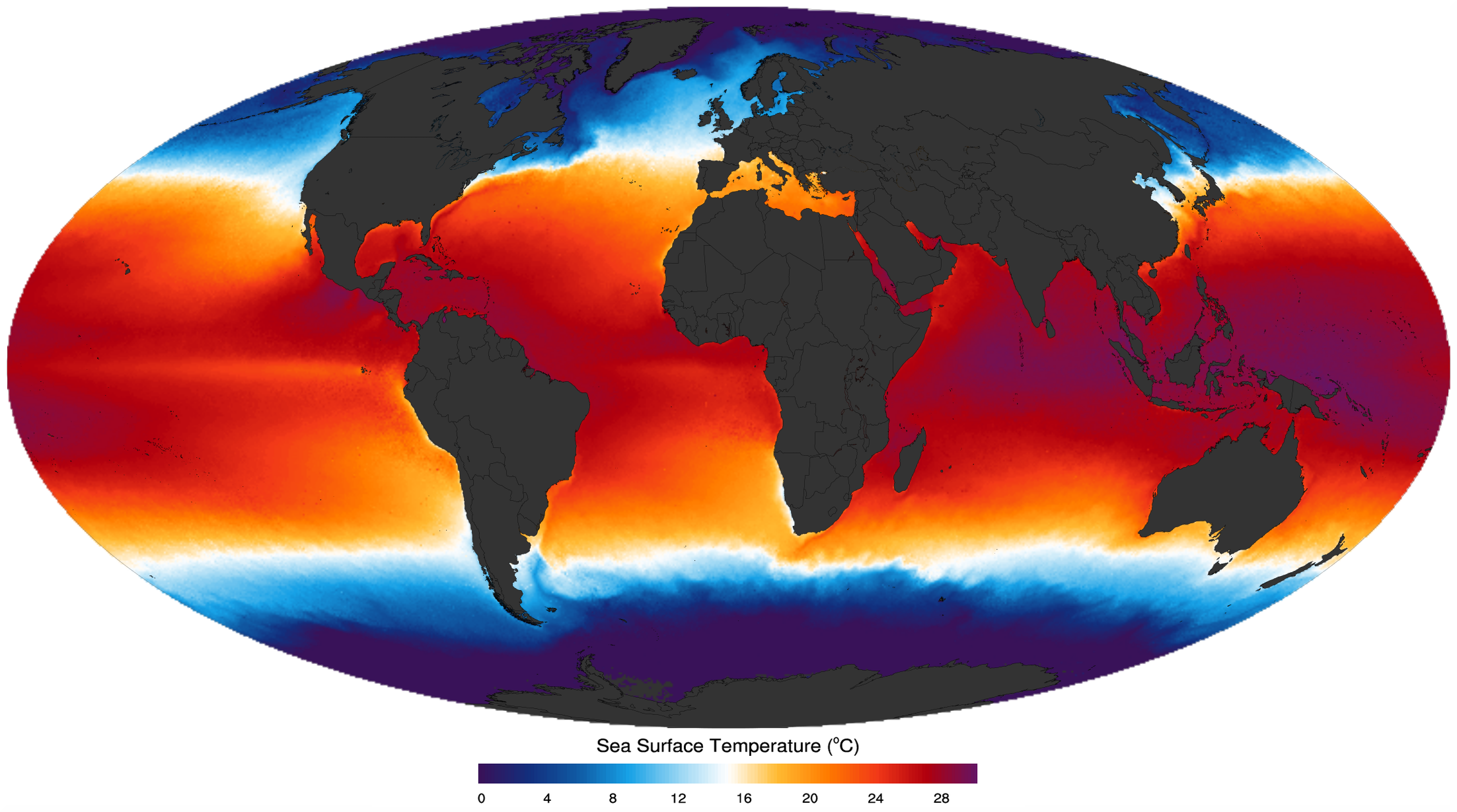
2003–2011 SST based on MODIS Aqua data

Weather satellites have been available to determine sea surface temperature information since 1967, with the first global composites created during 1970. Since 1982, satellites have been increasingly utilized to measure SST and have allowed its spatial and temporal variation to be viewed more fully. Satellite measurements of SST are in reasonable agreement with in situ temperature measurements. The satellite measurement is made by sensing the ocean radiation in two or more wavelengths within the infrared part of the electromagnetic spectrum or other parts of the spectrum which can then be empirically related to SST. These wavelengths are chosen because they are:

1. within the peak of the blackbody radiation expected from the Earth, and
2. able to transmit adequately well through the atmosphere

The satellite-measured SST provides both a synoptic view of the ocean and a high frequency of repeat views, allowing the examination of basin-wide upper ocean dynamics not possible with ships or buoys. NASA's (National Aeronautic and Space Administration) Moderate Resolution Imaging Spectroradiometer (MODIS) SST satellites have been providing global SST data since 2000, available with a one-day lag. NOAA's GOES (Geostationary Orbiting Earth Satellites) satellites are geo-stationary above the Western Hemisphere which enables them to deliver SST data on an hourly basis with only a few hours of lag time.

There are several difficulties with satellite-based absolute SST measurements. First, in infrared remote sensing methodology the radiation emanates from the top "skin" of the ocean, approximately the top 0.01 mm or less, which may not represent the bulk temperature of the upper meter of ocean due primarily to effects of solar surface heating during the daytime, reflected radiation, as well as sensible heat loss and surface evaporation. All these factors make it somewhat difficult to compare satellite data to measurements from buoys or shipboard methods, complicating ground truth efforts. Secondly, the satellite cannot look through clouds, creating a cool bias in satellite-derived SSTs within cloudy areas. However, passive microwave techniques can accurately measure SST and penetrate cloud cover. Within atmospheric sounder channels on weather satellites, which peak just above the ocean's surface, knowledge of the sea surface temperature is important to their calibration.

== Importance to the Earth's atmosphere ==
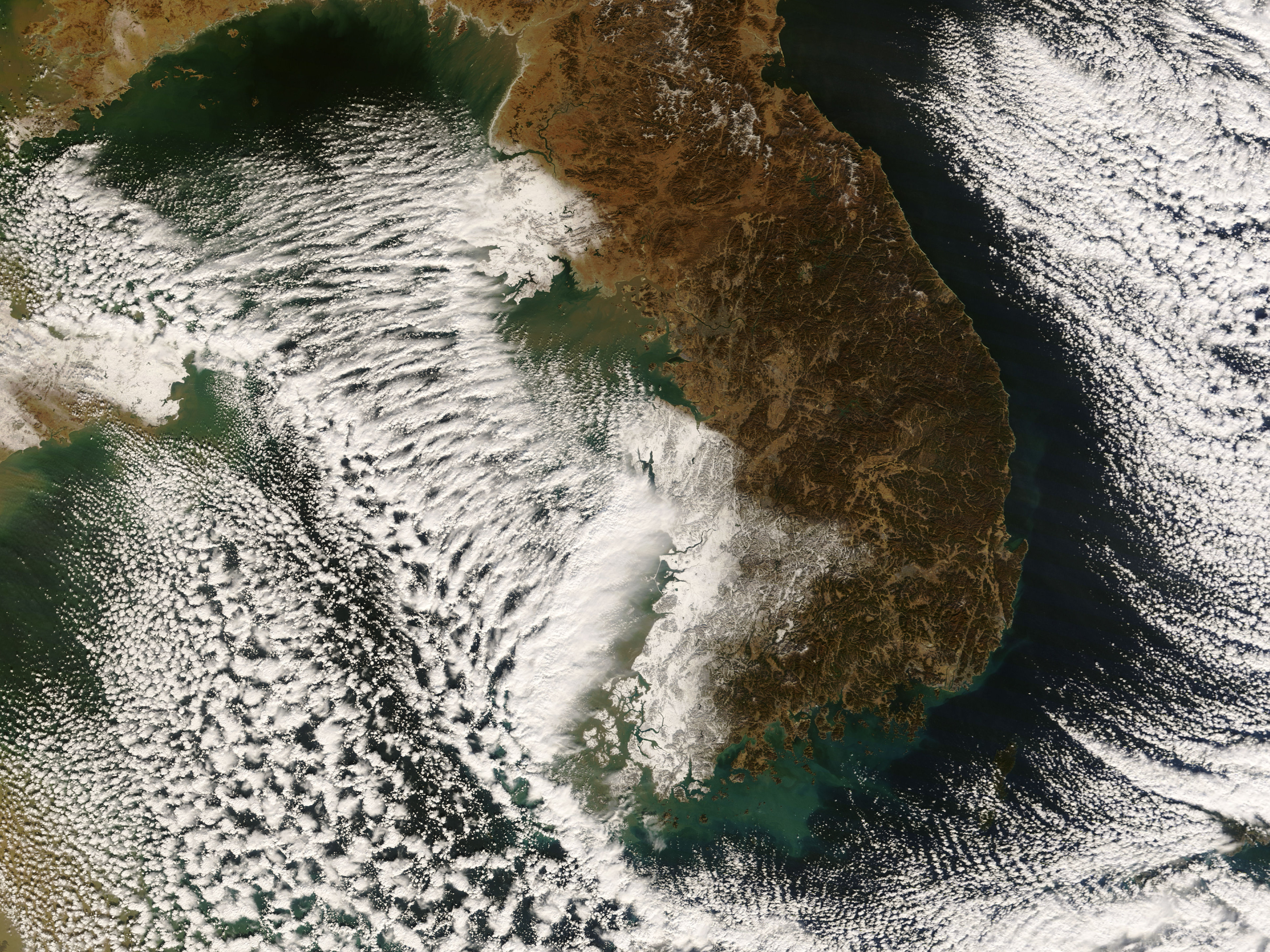
Sea-effect snow bands near the Korean Peninsula

Sea surface temperature affects the behavior of the Earth's atmosphere above, so their initialization into atmospheric models is important. While sea surface temperature is important for tropical cyclogenesis, it is also important in determining the formation of sea fog and sea breezes. Heat from underlying warmer waters can significantly modify an air mass over distances as short as 35 kilometres (22 mi) to 40 kilometres (25 mi). For example, southwest of Northern Hemisphere extratropical cyclones, curved cyclonic flow bringing cold air across relatively warm water bodies can lead to narrow lake-effect snow (or sea effect) bands. Those bands bring strong localized precipitation, often in the form of snow, since large water bodies such as lakes efficiently store heat that results in significant temperature differences—larger than 13 °C (23 °F)—between the water surface and the air above. Because of this temperature difference, warmth and moisture are transported upward, condensing into vertically oriented clouds which produce snow showers. The temperature decrease with height and cloud depth are directly affected by both the water temperature and the large-scale environment. The stronger the temperature decrease with height, the taller the clouds get, and the greater the precipitation rate becomes.

=== Tropical cyclones ===
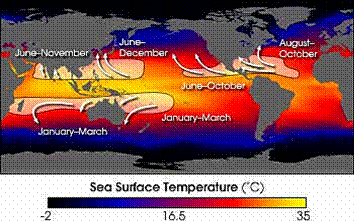
Seasonal peaks of tropical cyclone activity worldwide

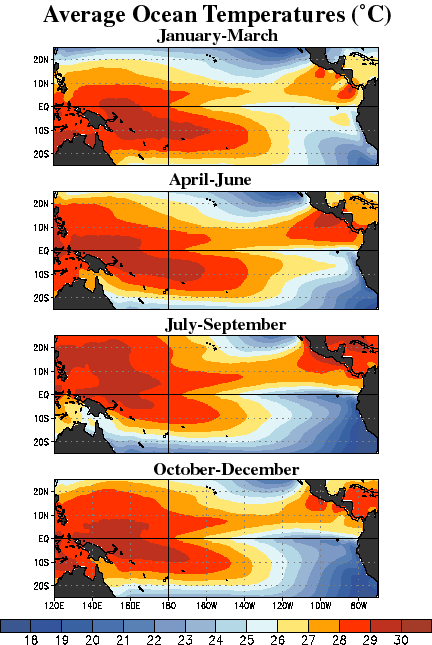
Average equatorial Pacific temperatures

Ocean temperature of at least 26.5°C (79.7°F) spanning through at minimum a 50-metre depth is one of the precursors needed to maintain a tropical cyclone (a type of mesocyclone). These warm waters are needed to maintain the warm core that fuels tropical systems. This value is well above 16.1 °C (60.9 °F), the long term global average surface temperature of the oceans. However, this requirement can be considered only a general baseline because it assumes that the ambient atmospheric environment surrounding an area of disturbed weather presents average conditions. Tropical cyclones have intensified when SSTs were slightly below this standard temperature.

Tropical cyclones are known to form even when normal conditions are not met. For example, cooler air temperatures at a higher altitude (e.g., at the 500 hPa level, or 5.9 km) can lead to tropical cyclogenesis at lower water temperatures, as a certain lapse rate is required to force the atmosphere to be unstable enough for convection. In a moist atmosphere, this lapse rate is 6.5 °C/km, while in an atmosphere with less than 100% relative humidity, the required lapse rate is 9.8 °C/km.

At the 500 hPa level, the air temperature averages −7 °C (18 °F) within the tropics, but air in the tropics is normally dry at this height, giving the air room to wet-bulb, or cool as it moistens, to a more favorable temperature that can then support convection. A wet-bulb temperature at 500 hPa in a tropical atmosphere of −13.2 °C (8.2 °F) is required to initiate convection if the water temperature is 26.5 °C (79.7 °F), and this temperature requirement increases or decreases proportionally by 1 °C in the sea surface temperature for each 1 °C change at 500 hpa. Inside a cold cyclone, 500 hPa temperatures can fall as low as −30 °C (−22 °F), which can initiate convection even in the driest atmospheres. This also explains why moisture in the mid-levels of the troposphere, roughly at the 500 hPa level, is normally a requirement for development. However, when dry air is found at the same height, temperatures at 500 hPa need to be even colder as dry atmospheres require a greater lapse rate for instability than moist atmospheres. At heights near the tropopause, the 30-year average temperature (as measured in the period encompassing 1961 through 1990) was −77 °C (−132 °F). One example of a tropical cyclone maintaining itself over cooler waters was Epsilon late in the 2005 Atlantic hurricane season.

== See also ==
- El Niño–Southern Oscillation – Global climate phenomenon
- Global surface temperature – Average temperature of the Earth's surface
- Halocline – Stratification of a body of water due to salinity differences
- Marine heatwave – Unusually warm temperature event in the ocean
- Ocean heat content – Energy stored by oceans
- Pacific decadal oscillation – Recurring pattern of climate variability
- Sea level rise – Rise in sea levels due to climate change
