= Alberta Hail Project =

Meteorological research project

The Alberta Hail Project was a research project sponsored by the Alberta Research Council and Environment Canada to study hailstorm physics and dynamics in order to design and test means for suppressing hail. It ran from 1956 until 1985. The main instrument in this research was an S-band circularly polarized weather radar located at the Red Deer Industrial Airport in central Alberta, Canada.

A vast amount of data was collected from several other platforms to conduct research into precipitation mechanisms, severe storm development, hail suppression, hydrology and microwave propagation. Numerous researchers have used the dataset and during the period 1990 to 1994, 23 publications appeared in journals and conferences, as well as 4 scientific reports were prepared. These papers have included radar meteorology, cloud physics, hydrology/hydrometeorology, computer science, instrumentation, synoptic weather, dynamic and mesoscale meteorology.

== Description ==
The project area covered 33,700 km^{2} and was centred on the Penhold radar site located near the Red Deer Airport (52.2°N 113.9°W). The program had different ways of evaluating the atmospheric conditions for hail and its detection.

Each spring, approximately 20,000 farmers in the project area would receive cards to record any event of hail, including its size. On days with hail, between 10 % and 20 % of the farmers reported, an average of one observer per 16–32 km^{2}. Telephone surveys were also conducted, resulting in observation densities as high as one report per 3 square kilometers. As a result, it is believed that only a very small percentage of hail reaching the surface went undetected. For the duration of the project, six categories were specified to size the observed hailstones conveniently: diameters less than 0.4 cm, 0.4–1.2 cm, 1.3–2.0 cm; 2.1–3.2 cm, 3.3–5.2 cm, and larger than 5.2 cm.

Radiosondes were released from Penhold at 1715 local time (2315 UTC). Data were used to evaluate the atmospheric conditions on hail days within 3 h (i.e., between 1415 and 2015 LT) and 100 km from the sounding site. A few of these proximity soundings had to be excluded because of missing data or because they were modified by precipitation or a thunderstorm outflow boundary. In addition to upper-air sounding data, the surface temperature and dewpoint (representative of the storm's inflow) were obtained from a mesonetwork.

The radar would be used to detect not only the intensity of the precipitation by its reflectivity, but the type of hydrometeors with the circular polarization. These would be correlated with the surface observations to study the structure of the thunderstorms leading to hail formation. Furthermore, at certain times there would be aircraft flight in and around convective areas to gather further information on the atmospheric conditions and sample the clouds.

Observations were also made by sampling vehicles. The vehicles were outfitted with various meteorological instrumentation and hail catching apparatus. They were directed into suspected thunderstorm hail regions by a controller at the radar site. The controller communicated with the vehicles by radio.
