= Rhenish (disambiguation) =

Rhenish (/rɛnɪʃ/) is an adjective that refers to the river Rhine and its associated region in western Europe, especially the Rhineland.

Rhenish may also refer to:

== Places ==
- Rhenish Franconia, a region of Germany
- Rhenish Hesse, a region of Germany
- Rhenish Massif, a geologic massif in western Europe
- Rhenish Palatinate (disambiguation), a region of Germany
- Upper Rhenish Circle, an Imperial circle of the Holy Roman Empire

== Language ==
- Rhenish Franconian languages, a dialect chain of West Central German
  - Rhenish, the Rhinelandic regiolect
  - Rhenish fan

== Institutions ==
- Rhenish Girls' High School, South Africa
- Rhenish Missionary Society, a Protestant missionary society established in 1828
- Rhenish Railway Company (1835–1886)
- Rhenish Republic (1923)
- Rhenish Tower, Lynmouth, Devon, UK
- Rhenish-Westphalian Coal Syndicate, an industrial cartel established in 1893

== Horse breeds ==
- Rhenish German Coldblood
- Rhenish Warmblood

== Other ==
- Rhenish, wine from the Rheinhessen wine region
- Rhenish gulden, gold coin minted in the Rhineland
- Rhenish helm, type of church spire
- Rhenish (format) newspaper format
- Symphony No. 3 (Schumann), known as the Rhenish Symphony
