= Project Cumulus =

1950s UK government initiative and the subject of conspiracy theories

Project Cumulus was a 1950s UK government initiative to investigate weather manipulation, in particular through cloud seeding experiments. The project, which was operational between 1949 and 1952, was known jokingly as Operation Witch Doctor. The experiments involved RAF planes dropping chemicals above clouds in an attempt to make rain.

A conspiracy theory has circulated claiming that the Lynmouth Flood was caused by Project Cumulus. However, the claim ignores the size of the meteorological weather pattern and how similar floods have occurred throughout British Isles for centuries.

== Project ==
Operation Cumulus was based at the RAF's School of Aeronautics at RAF Cranfield in Bedfordshire, England. Scientists worked with the RAF and the MoD's meteorological research flight based at RAF Farnborough to identify chemicals, which were provided by ICI in Billingham, that could be released into clouds to cause rain through artificial means.

The military applications for this included stopping enemy movement because of boggy ground or flooded rivers, and clearing fog from airfields. Another reason was that rainmaking might have the potential "to explode an atomic weapon in a seeded storm system or cloud. This would produce a far wider area of radioactive contamination than in a normal atomic explosion".

Methods that were tested involved releasing pellets of salt, dry ice, or silver iodide into clouds from aircraft or from firing them into clouds from the ground.

== Lynmouth ==
On 16 August 1952, a severe flood occurred in the town of Lynmouth in north Devon. nine inches (230 millimetres) of rain fell within twenty-four hours: "Ninety million tonnes of water swept down the narrow valley into Lynmouth" and the East Lyn River rose rapidly and burst its banks. Thirty-four people died and many buildings and bridges were seriously damaged. According to the BBC, "North Devon experienced 250 times the normal August rainfall in 1952."

The amount of rainfall cited by the BBC seems questionable, probably overstated by a factor of 100 (as 230 mm of rain would be approximately 2.5 times the normal amount for a typical August month). An article from the 1953 Geography Journal cited the rainfall levels to be high, but nothing close to the levels suggested by the BBC article from 2001.

Comparable floods in the area have been recorded in the past, such as one in 1924.

A conspiracy theory has circulated that the flood was caused by secret cloud seeding experiments conducted by the Royal Air Force. However, noting that the experiments were not secret, that the cloud seeding experiments were at the scale of individual clouds, and that the whole of the southwestern corner of the British Isles was affected by heavy rain at the time, the theory to whether the weather was impacted has been dismissed as "preposterous" by one weather expert Philip Eden.
