= Lynmouth =

Village in Devon, England

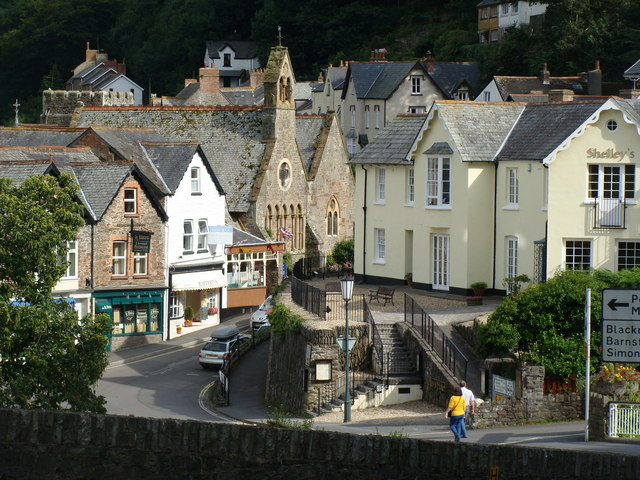
- Lynmouth village

- Location within Devon
- OS grid reference: SS7249
- Civil parish: Lynton and Lynmouth
- District: North Devon
- Shire county: Devon
- Region: South West
- Country: England
- Sovereign state: United Kingdom
- Postcode district: EX
- Police: Devon and Cornwall
- Fire: Devon and Somerset
- Ambulance: South Western
- UK Parliament: North Devon

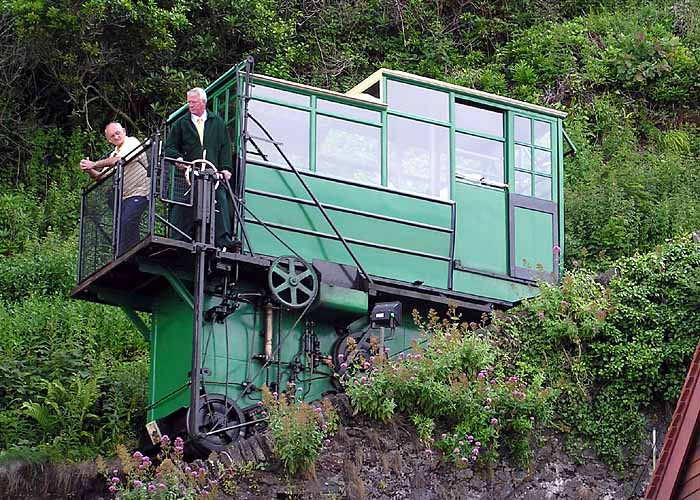
A car of the Lynton and Lynmouth Cliff Railway. Opened in 1890, the railway is a water-operated funicular, 210 metres (690 ft) long, operating on a 1 in 1.75 gradient track. One car descends, while the other ascends, on a counterbalance system. The water is piped from the West Lyn River

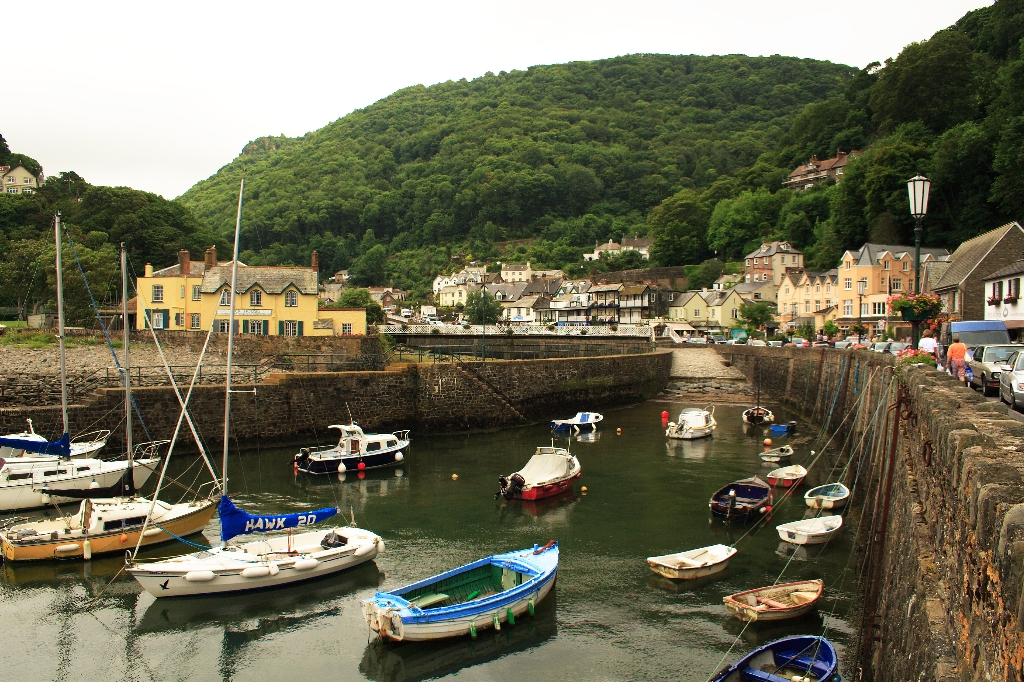
Lynmouth Harbour

Lynmouth is a village in Devon, England, on the northern edge of Exmoor. The village straddles the confluence of the West Lyn and East Lyn rivers, in a gorge 700 feet (210 m) directly below the neighbouring town of Lynton, which was the only place to expand to once Lynmouth became as built-up as possible. The villages are connected by the Lynton and Lynmouth Cliff Railway, which works two cable-connected cars by gravity, using water tanks.

The two villages are a civil parish governed by Lynton and Lynmouth Town Council. The parish boundaries extend southwards from the coast, and include hamlets such as Barbrook and small moorland settlements such as East Ilkerton, West Ilkerton and Shallowford.

The South West Coast Path and Tarka Trail pass through, and the Two Moors Way runs from Ivybridge in South Devon to Lynmouth; the Samaritans Way South West runs from Bristol to Lynton, and the Coleridge Way from Nether Stowey to Lynmouth.

Lynmouth was described by Thomas Gainsborough, who honeymooned there with his bride Margaret Burr, as "the most delightful place for a landscape painter this country can boast".

The Sillery Sands beach (Note: Location of Sillery Sands Beach 51°13′57″N 3°48′24″W) is just off the South West Coast Path and was used by naturists. Following landslides, it is now difficult to access and its use is no longer recommended.

Percy Bysshe Shelley, his wife Harriet and his sister-in-law Eliza stayed in Lynmouth between June and August 1812. Shelley worked on political pamphlets and on the poem "Queen Mab". He was delighted with the village.

== Lynmouth Lifeboat ==
A lifeboat station was established in Lynmouth on 20 January 1869, five months after the sailing vessel Home was wrecked nearby. The lifeboat was kept in a shed on the beach, until a purpose-built boat house was built at the harbour. This was rebuilt in 1898 and enlarged in 1906–07. It was closed at the end of 1944 because other stations in the area could provide cover with their newer motor lifeboats. The boat house was then used as a club, but was washed away in the flood of 15 August 1952. It has since been rebuilt, and now includes a public shelter.

At 7:52 pm on 12 January 1899, the 1,900 ton three-masted ship Forrest Hall, carrying thirteen crew and five apprentices, was in trouble off Porlock Weir on the north Somerset coast, owing to a severe gale that had been blowing all day. She had been under tow, but the tow rope had broken. She was dragging her anchor and had lost her steering gear. The ship's destruction was probable. The alarm was raised for the Louisa, the Lynmouth lifeboat, to be launched to assist. However, launching was impossible because of the terrible weather. Jack Crocombe, the coxswain of the Louisa, proposed to take the boat by road to Porlock's sheltered harbour, 13 miles (21 km) around the coast, and launch it from there.

The boat plus its carriage weighed about 10 tons, and transporting it would not be easy. 20 horses and 100 men started by hauling the boat up the 1 in 4 Countisbury Hill out of Lynmouth. Six of the men were sent ahead with picks and shovels to widen the road. The highest point is 1,423 feet (434 m) above sea level. After they had crossed the 15 miles (24 km) of wild Exmoor paths, they had to descend the dangerous Porlock Hill, with horses and men pulling ropes to stall the descent. During this, they had to demolish part of a garden wall and fell a large tree to make a way. The lifeboat reached Porlock Weir at 6:30 am, and was launched. Although cold, wet, hungry and exhausted, the crew rowed for over an hour in heavy seas to reach the stricken Forrest Hall and rescue the thirteen men and five apprentices with no casualties. However, four of the horses employed died of exhaustion. The Forrest Hall was towed into Barry, Wales.

The feat was immortalised in C Walter Hodges' 1969 children's historical novel The Overland Launch, and was re-enacted 100 years after the event, in daylight, on today's much better roads.

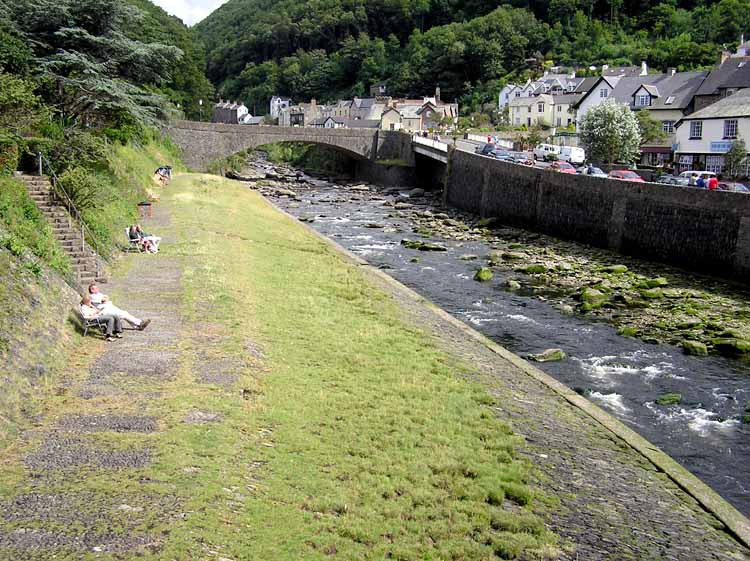
The meeting of the Lynmouth rivers. The river seen here is the East Lyn River, the West Lyn River joins it at the white bridge.

== 1952 Lynmouth flood ==
On 15 and 16 August 1952, a storm of tropical intensity broke over South West England, depositing 229 millimetres (9.0 in) of rain within 24 hours on an already waterlogged Exmoor. It is thought that a cold front scooped up a thunderstorm, and the orographic effect worsened the storm. Debris-laden floodwaters cascaded down the northern escarpment of the moor, converging upon the village of Lynmouth. In particular, in the upper West Lyn valley, a dam was formed by fallen trees and other debris; this in due course gave way, sending a huge wave of water and debris down that river. The River Lyn through the town had been culverted in order to gain land for business premises; this culvert soon choked with flood debris, and the river flowed through the town. Much of the debris was boulders and trees.

Overnight, over 100 buildings were destroyed or seriously damaged along with 28 of the 31 bridges, and 38 cars were washed out to sea. In total, 34 people died and a further 420 were made homeless.

Similar events had been recorded at Lynmouth in 1607 and 1796. After the 1952 disaster, the village was rebuilt, including diverting the river around the village.

A conspiracy theory has circulated that the 1952 flood was caused by secret cloud seeding experiments conducted by the RAF. Weather historian Philip Eden has described this theory as "preposterous".

The small group of houses on the bank of the East Lyn River called Middleham, between Lynmouth and Watersmeet, was destroyed and never rebuilt. Today, a memorial garden stands on the site.

A memorial hall dedicated to the disaster is on the front toward the harbour; it contains photographs, newspaper reports and a scale model of the village, showing how it looked before the flood. A further photo and information display is found in St John the Baptist parish church.

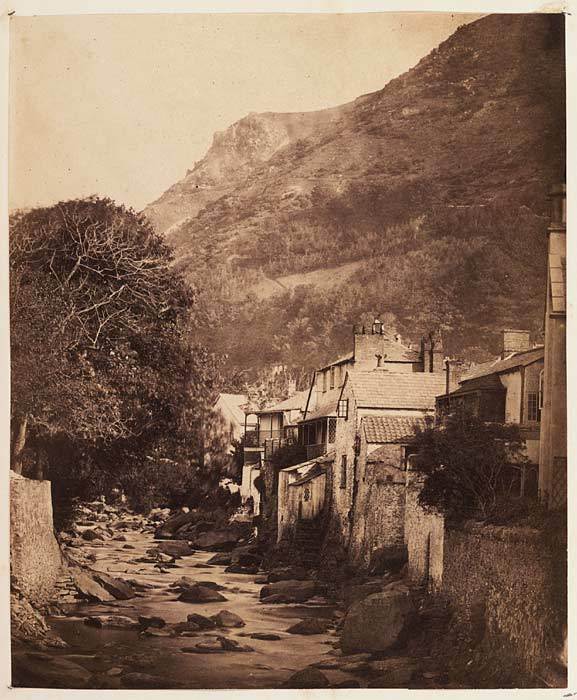
Taken in the 1850s this is probably the first ever photograph of Lynmouth

== Twinning ==
The town of Lynton and Lynmouth is twinned with Bénouville in France.

== Cultural references ==
In her poetical illustration Linmouth, to an engraving of a painting by Thomas Allom, Letitia Elizabeth Landon describes the beauties of rural nature but ends with the words: 'Aye beautiful the dreaming brought By valleys and green fields; But deeper feeling, higher thought, Is what the city yields.' and in the footnote she speaks of her great love for London. Another of her poetical illustrations, again to a Thomas Allom picture but in a different vein, is Valley of Linmouth, North Devon.

The British technical modern rock band InMe make recurring references to the Lynton/Lynmouth area in their lyrical material. Lynton is mentioned in "In Loving Memory" on their third album Daydream Anonymous, and Lynmouth is mentioned in "Saccharine Arcadia" on Phoenix: The Very Best of InMe. Lead singer Dave McPherson also has a song entitled "Sunny Lynton" on his EP Crescent Summer Sessions and refers to Watersmeet in "Waltzing in a Supermarket" on I Don't Do Requests.

The village of Hollow Bay in The Secret of Crickley Hall by James Herbert is based on Lynmouth; Devil's Cleave is based on the East Lyn Valley and Watersmeet. The book brings together two stories, that of child evacuees during the Second World War and that of the 1952 flood disaster that devastated Lynmouth.

Suzanne Goldring's novel The Girl Without a Name features a woman who disappears during the 1952 Lynmouth flood while on holiday with her married lover. Like The Secret of Crickley Hall, part of the plot revolves around World War II child evacuees from London.

The Song "13 Miles" by the punk folk band Skinny Lister details the story of the 1899 Lynmouth lifeboat launch from Porlock; where a lifeboat had to be carried 13 miles over the moor due to poor weather conditions at Lynmouth Lifeboat Station. The launch saved all 18 souls stranded at sea.

== Transport ==
Lynmouth is served by the following bus services:

- 309/310 Lynton & Lynmouth - Barnstaple (Stagecoach, previously Fillers)

== Sport ==
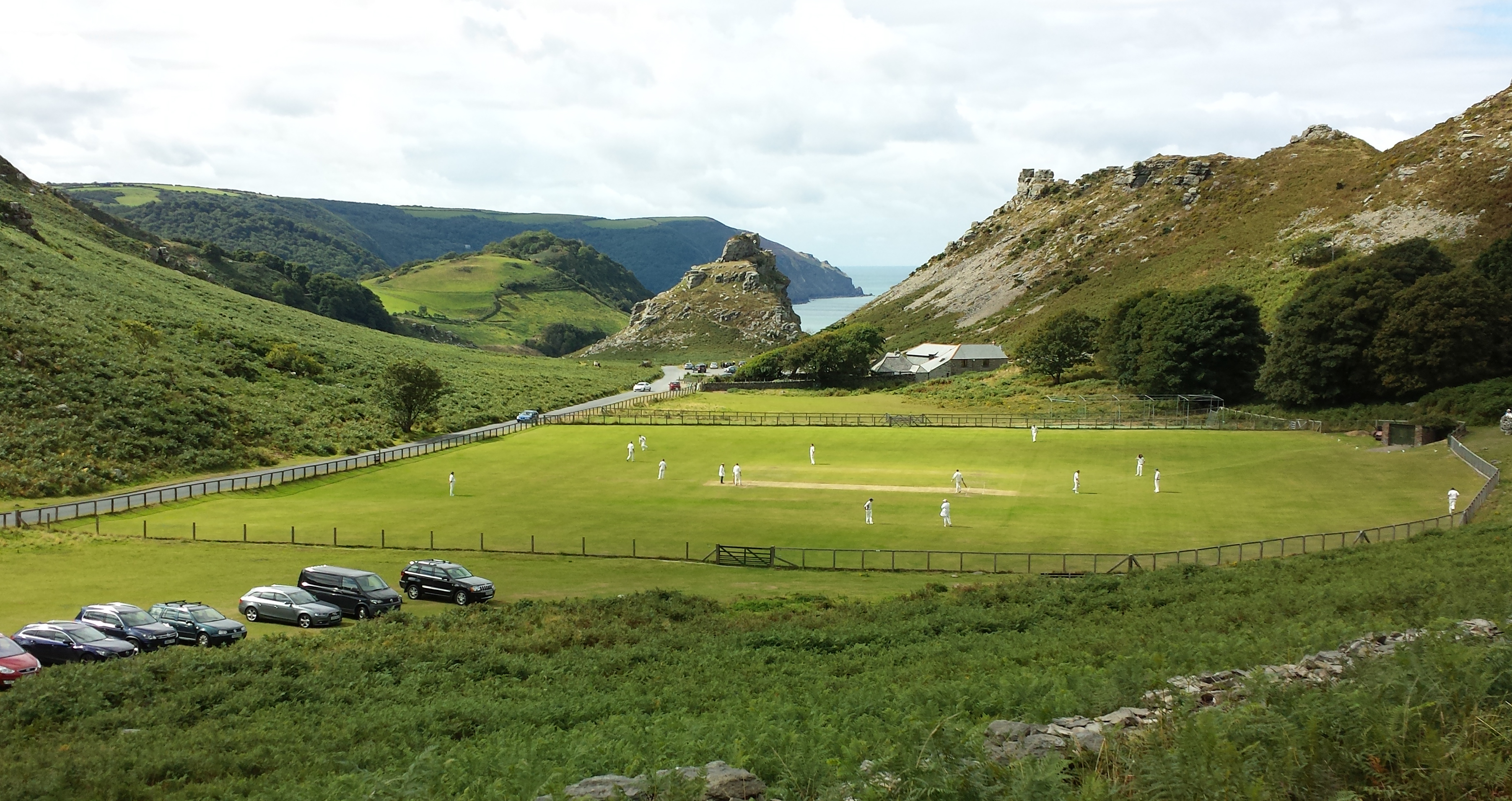
Lynton & Lynmouth Cricket Club

The Lynton & Lynmouth Cricket Club, founded in August 1876, meet at the Valley of the Rocks.

== See also ==
- List of natural disasters in the United Kingdom
- Myrtlebury
- Rhenish Tower, Lynmouth
