= Lynmouth Flood =

1952 natural disaster in the county of Devon, England

The Lynmouth flood disaster
Meteorological history
- Duration: Night of 15 and 16 August 1952

Overall effects
- Fatalities: 34
- Damage: Substantial
- Areas affected: Lynmouth, Simonsbath, Filleigh, Middleham (never rebuilt), Devon

The Lynmouth Flood occurred on the night of 15–16 August 1952, principally affecting the village of Lynmouth, in North Devon. A storm with heavy rainfall, combined with already saturated soil and flood debris, led to the flooding of the village and a total loss of 34 lives.

== Background ==
On 15 and 16 August 1952, a storm of tropical intensity broke over south-west England, depositing 229 millimetres (9.0 in) of rain within 24 hours on the already saturated soil of Exmoor, Devon. It is thought that a cold front scooped up a thunderstorm, and the orographic effect worsened the storm. Debris-laden floodwaters cascaded down the northern escarpment of the moor, converging upon the village of Lynmouth; in particular, in the upper West Lyn valley, fallen trees and other debris formed a dam, which in due course gave way, sending a huge wave of water and debris down the river. A guest at the Lyndale Hotel described the night to the Sunday Express:

From seven o'clock last night the waters rose rapidly and at nine o'clock it was just like an avalanche coming through our hotel, bringing down boulders from the hills and breaking down walls, doors and windows. Within half an hour the guests had evacuated the ground floor. In another ten minutes the second floor was covered, and then we made for the top floor where we spent the night.

The River Lyn through the town had been culverted to gain land for business premises; this culvert soon choked with flood debris, and the river flowed through the town. Much of the debris was boulders and trees.

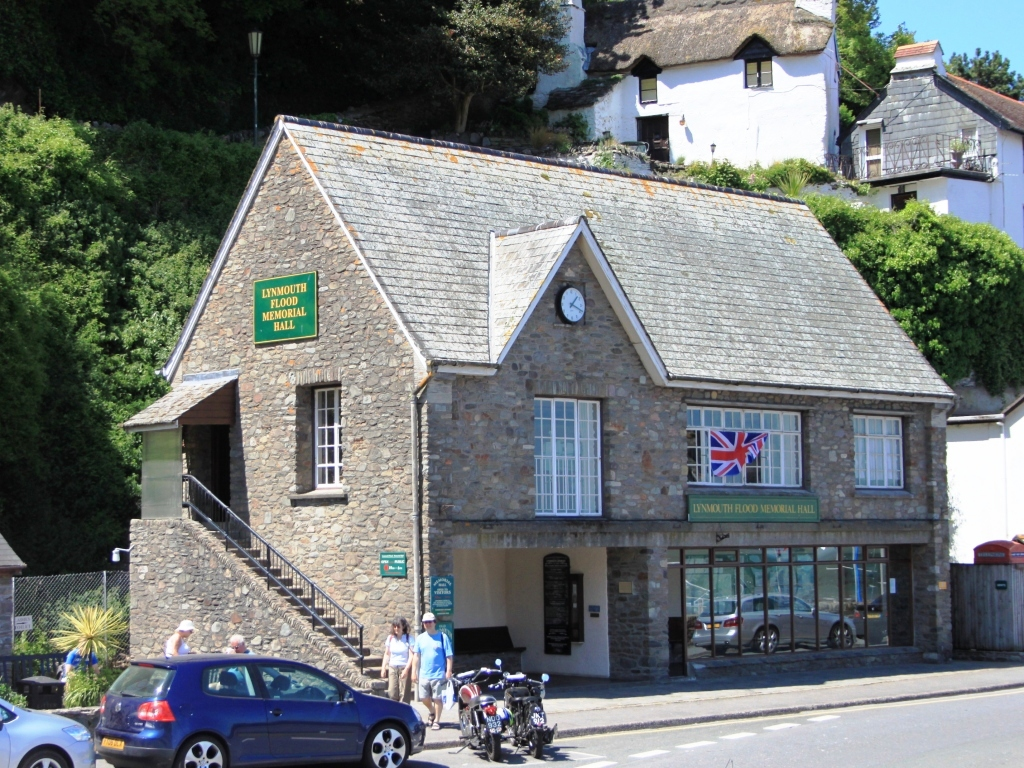
The Flood Memorial Hall has been built on the site of the old lifeboat station, one of the buildings destroyed in the flood.

Overnight, more than 100 buildings were destroyed or seriously damaged along with 28 of the 31 bridges, and 38 cars were washed out to sea. In total, 34 people died, with a further 420 made homeless. The seawall and Rhenish Tower survived the main flood, but were seriously undermined. The tower collapsed into the river the next day, causing a temporary flood. They were subsequently rebuilt.

At the same time, the River Bray at Filleigh also flooded, costing the lives of three Scouts from Manchester who had been camping alongside the river overnight.

Over 50,000 tons of rock were moved by water during the disaster. Large rocks and boulders washed downstream can still be found today, alongside boulder field deposits in nearby locations such as the valleys of Watersmeet.

== Cause ==
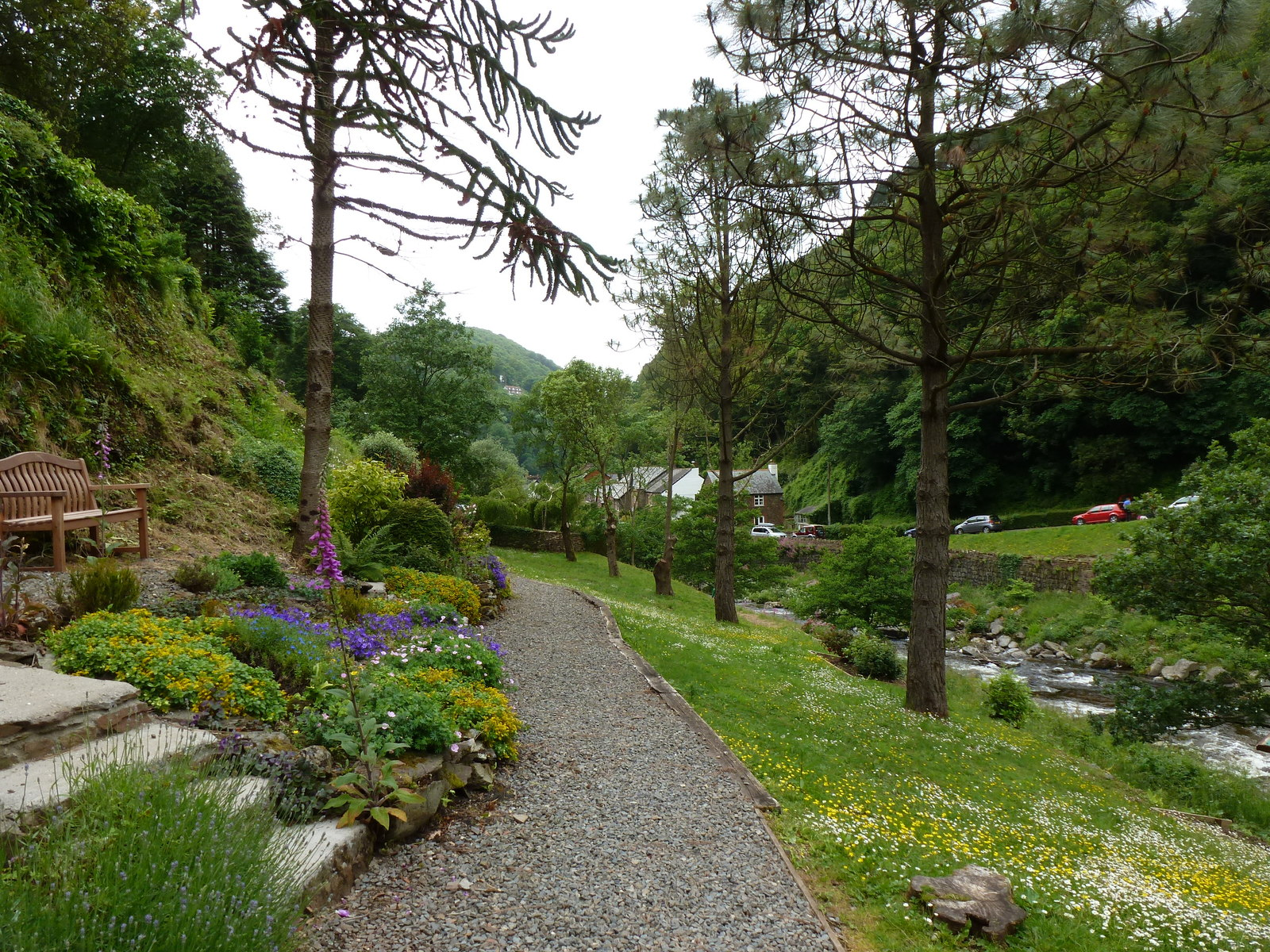
Middleham memorial gardens

The root cause of the flood was heavy rainfall associated with a low-pressure area that had formed over the Atlantic Ocean some days earlier. As the low passed the British Isles, it manifested as a weather front which caused exceptionally heavy rainfall, the effect of which was intensified because the rain fell on already waterlogged land; the effect was further exacerbated over Exmoor by an orographic effect. The lack of satellite data in 1952 meant the weather could not be forecast as reliably as it can be today.

Similar floods had been recorded at Lynmouth in 1607 and 1796. After the 1952 disaster, Lynmouth village was rebuilt, including diverting the river around the village. The small group of houses on the bank of the East Lyn River called Middleham between Lynmouth and Watersmeet was destroyed and never rebuilt. Today, there stands a memorial garden.

On 16 August 2004 - exactly 52 years to the day of the Lynmouth Flood - a similar incident happened in Cornwall, when flash floods caused extensive damage to Boscastle, but without loss of life. The hydrological setting of these two villages is very similar.

== Conspiracy theory ==
A conspiracy theory has spread that the flood was caused by secret cloud seeding experiments carried out by the Royal Air Force (RAF) between 1949 and 1952.

The theory was fuelled by a 2001 BBC Radio 4 documentary, which suggested that the events of 1952 were connected to Project Cumulus. The programme alleged that "the infamous Lynmouth flood disaster came only days after RAF rain-making experiments over southern England", and that secret experiments were causing heavy rainfall. According to the programme, "classified documents on the trials that Project Cumulus contributed to the conditions that caused this flood have gone missing". A few days before the disaster a seeding experiment was carried out over southern England. Alan Yates, an aeronautical engineer and glider pilot who was working with the operation, sprayed salt in the air and was "elated" to learn of a heavy rainfall in Staines shortly after.

"Survivors tell how the air smelled of sulphur on the afternoon of the floods, and the rain fell so hard it hurt people's faces."

Meteorologist Philip Eden has said the experiments could not have caused the accident: "It is preposterous to blame the Lynmouth flood on such experiments". Eden also said "The storm which caused the 1952 disaster was not confined to the Lynmouth district." while in reality "The East and West Lyn rivers, which drop rapidly down from Exmoor, were swollen even before the fatal storm."
