= Laser-assisted water condensation =

Experimental technique to induce rainfall

Laser-assisted water condensation is an experimental technique for artificially causing rainfall. This technique was developed in 2011 by scientists from the University of Geneva. It is related to cloud seeding.

The technique works by creating nitric particles in the clouds that cause condensation with laser pulses.
