= Myrtlebury =

Iron Age hill fort in Devon, England

Coordinates: 51.2240°N 3.8019°W

Myrtlebury is an Iron Age enclosure or 'spur' hill fort situated close to Lynmouth in Devon, England. The fort is effectively the northeast of a hillside forming a spur or promontory above the steep valley of the East Lyn River to the east of the village, at approximately 150 metres (490 ft) above sea level.
