= Barbrook =

Village in Devon, England

Coordinates: 51.214224°N 3.8405°W

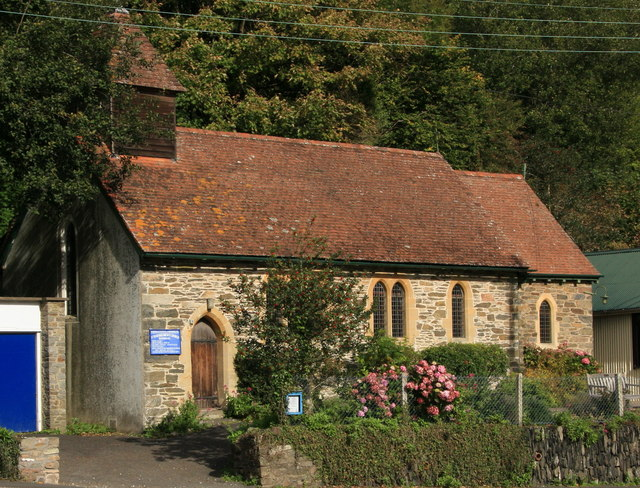
- St. Bartholomew's Church, Barbrook

- Location within Devon
- OS grid reference: SS715477
- District: North Devon
- Shire county: Devon
- Region: South West
- Country: England
- Sovereign state: United Kingdom
- Post town: Lynton
- Postcode district: EX35
- Dialling code: 01598
- Police: Devon and Cornwall
- Fire: Devon and Somerset
- Ambulance: South Western
- UK Parliament: North Devon

Barbrook is a village in Devon, England. It is close to the source of the West Lyn River.

The village post office and shop closed on 27 September 2008. The listed former school house is beside the A39. There is currently a petrol station and shop at the junction of the A39 and B3234.

Barbrook was affected by the 1952 Lynmouth Flood. A sign showing the height of the floodwater can be seen in Cherrybridge and there is a memorial garden on the site of 2 houses which fell into the river. The original stone arched road bridge on the site of the current foot bridge was destroyed and a new bridge was constructed further upstream, a house was demolished to make way for the new roadway. The river channel was enlarged to prevent future problems.

In the early part of the 1900s it was mostly surrounded by conifer plantations, these were felled and have now been replaced by deciduous woodland.

Barbrook means "Babbling Brook", in 1650 it was known as Babbroke.

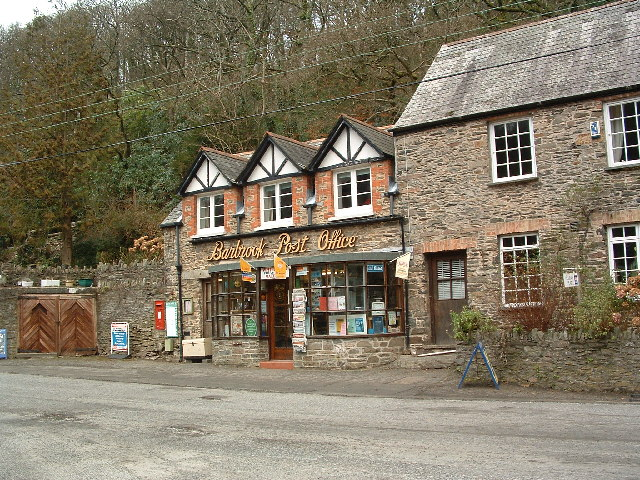
Barbrook Post Office.
