= Rheinpfalz =

Rheinpfalz may refer to:

== Regions in Germany called Rhenish Palatinate in English ==
- Rhenish Palatinate (German: Rheinpfalz), the old name for the Palatinate region (Pfalz), Rhineland-Palatinate. The name Rheinpfalz is still used in German today for this region.
- Rhenish Palatinate (German: Rheinpfalz), another name for the Circle of the Rhine (Rheinkreis) or the Bavarian Palatinate (Bayerischen Pfalz) west of the Rhine, from 1835 until 1946
- Rhine Palatinate (German: Rheinpfalz), the former name of the Palatinate wine region

== Other ==
- Rheinpfalz, an alternative name for Pfalzgrafenstein Castle in the Palatinate region, Germany
- Rheinpfalz, the name of a planning region in Rhineland-Palatinate's regional development law
- Die Rheinpfalz, a regional newspaper in Rhineland-Palatinate, Germany
- KDStV Rheinpfalz, a Roman Catholic students' association in Darmstadt, Germany
- Rheinpfalz, a term occasionally (wrongly) used to refer to the Anterior Palatinate region, due to its proximity to the Rhine
- Rheinpfalz, a term occasionally (wrongly) used to refer to the county of Rhein-Pfalz-Kreis (formerly the county of Ludwigshafen)

== See also ==
- Rhenish Palatinate (disambiguation)
