= Cloud seeding =

Weather modification that condenses clouds to cause rainfall

Cloud seeding can be done by ground generators or planes

Cloud seeding is a type of weather modification that aims to change the amount or type of precipitation, mitigate hail, or disperse fog. The usual objective is to increase rain or snow, either for its own sake or to prevent precipitation from occurring in days afterward.

Cloud seeding is undertaken by dispersing substances into the air that serve as cloud condensation or ice nuclei. Common agents include silver iodide, potassium iodide, and dry ice, with hygroscopic materials like table salt gaining popularity due to their ability to attract moisture. Techniques vary from static seeding, which encourages ice particle formation in supercooled clouds to increase precipitation, to dynamic seeding, designed to enhance convective cloud development through the release of latent heat.

Methods of dispersion include aircraft and ground-based generators or balloons, with newer approaches involving drones delivering electric charges to stimulate rainfall, or infrared laser pulses aimed at inducing particle formation. Despite decades of research and application, cloud seeding's effectiveness remains a subject of debate among scientists, with studies offering mixed results on its impact on precipitation enhancement.

Environmental and health impacts are considered minimal due to the low concentrations of substances used, but concerns persist over the potential accumulation of seeding agents in sensitive ecosystems. The practice has a long history, with initial experiments dating back to the 1940s, and has been used for various purposes, including agricultural benefits, water supply augmentation, and event planning. Legal frameworks primarily focus on prohibiting the military or hostile use of weather modification techniques, leaving the ownership and regulation of cloud-seeding activities to national discretion. Despite skepticism and debate over its efficacy and environmental impact, cloud seeding continues to be explored and applied in regions worldwide as a tool for weather modification.

== Methods ==
=== Salts ===
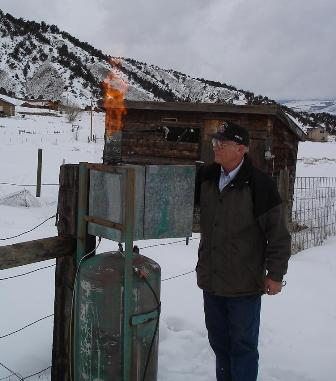
Ground-based silver iodide generator – Colorado, US

The most common chemicals used for cloud seeding include silver iodide, potassium iodide and dry ice (solid carbon dioxide). Liquid propane, which expands into a gas, has also been used. It can produce ice crystals at higher temperatures than silver iodide. After promising research, the use of hygroscopic materials, such as table salt, is becoming more popular.

When cloud seeding, increased snowfall takes place when temperatures within the clouds are between −20 and −7 °C (-4 °F and 20 °F). Freezing nucleation is induced by the introduction of substances similar to silver iodide, which has a crystalline structure like ice.

=== Electric charges ===
Since 2021, the United Arab Emirates have been using drones equipped with a payload of electric-charge emission instruments and customized sensors that fly at low altitudes and deliver an electric charge to air molecules. This method may have contributed to a significant rainstorm in July 2021. For instance, in Al Ain it rained 6.9 millimetres (¼ inch) on 20–21 July.

=== Infrared laser pulses ===
An electronic mechanism was tested in 2010, when infrared laser pulses were directed to the air above Berlin by researchers from the University of Geneva. The experimenters posited that the pulses would encourage atmospheric sulfur dioxide and nitrogen dioxide to form particles that would then act as seeds.

== Effectiveness ==
Despite decades of research and application, cloud seeding's effectiveness remains a subject of debate among scientists, with studies offering mixed results on its impact on precipitation enhancement, according to a report issued by the US Government Accountability Office in December 2024. Whether cloud seeding is effective in producing a statistically significant increase in precipitation has been a matter of academic debate, with contrasting results depending on the study in question and contrasting opinion among experts.

A study conducted by the United States National Academy of Sciences failed to find statistically significant support for cloud seeding's effectiveness. Based on its findings, Stanford University ecologist Jerry Bradley said: "I think you can squeeze out a little more snow or rain in some places under some conditions, but that's quite different from a program claiming to reliably increase precipitation." Data similar to that of the NAS study was acquired in a separate study conducted by the Wyoming Weather Modification Pilot Project, but whereas the NAS study concluded that "it is difficult to show clearly that cloud seeding has a very large effect", the WWMPP study concluded that "seeding could augment the snowpack by a maximum of 3% over an entire season."

In 2003, the US National Research Council (NRC) released a report stating, "science is unable to say with assurance which, if any, seeding techniques produce positive effects. In the 55 years following the first cloud-seeding demonstrations, substantial progress has been made in understanding the natural processes that account for our daily weather. Yet scientifically acceptable proof for significant seeding effects has not been achieved".

A 2010 Tel Aviv University study claimed that the common practice of cloud seeding to improve rainfall, with materials such as silver iodide and frozen carbon dioxide, seems to have little if any impact on the amount of precipitation. A 2011 study suggested that airplanes may produce ice particles by freezing cloud droplets that cool as they flow around the tips of propellers, over wings or over jet aircraft, and thereby unintentionally seed clouds. This could have potentially serious consequences for particular hail stone formation.

In 2016, Jeff Tilley, director of weather modification at the Desert Research Institute in Reno, claimed that new technology and research has produced reliable results that make cloud seeding a dependable and affordable water supply practice for many regions. Moreover, in 1998 the American Meteorological Society held that "precipitation from supercooled orographic clouds (clouds that develop over mountains) has been seasonally increased by about 10%."

Despite the mixed scientific results, cloud seeding was attempted during the 2008 Summer Olympics in Beijing to coax rain showers out of clouds before they reached the city in order to prevent rain during the opening and closing ceremonies. Whether this attempt was successful is a matter of dispute, with Roelof Bruintjes, who leads the National Center for Atmospheric Research's weather-modification group, remarking, "we cannot make clouds or chase clouds away".

== Impact on environment and health ==
With an NFPA 704 health hazard rating of 2, silver iodide can cause temporary incapacitation or possible residual injury to humans and other mammals with intense or chronic exposure. But several detailed ecological studies have shown negligible environmental and health impacts. The toxicity of silver and silver compounds (from silver iodide) was shown to be of low order in some studies. These findings likely result from the minute amounts of silver generated by cloud seeding, which are about one percent of industry emissions into the atmosphere in many parts of the world, or individual exposure from tooth fillings.

Accumulations in the soil, vegetation, and surface runoff have not been large enough to measure above natural background. A 1995 environmental assessment in the Sierra Nevada of California and a 2004 independent panel of experts in Australia confirmed these earlier findings.

"In 1978, an estimated 3,000 tonnes of silver were released into the US environment. This led the US Health Services and EPA to conduct studies regarding the potential for environmental and human health hazards related to silver. These agencies and other state agencies applied the Clean Water Act of 1977 and 1987 to establish regulations on this type of pollution."

Cloud seeding over Kosciuszko National Park – a biosphere reserve – is problematic in that several rapid changes of environmental legislation were made to enable the trial. Environmentalists are concerned about the uptake of elemental silver in a highly sensitive environment affecting the pygmy possum, among other species, as well as recent high-level algal blooms in once pristine glacial lakes. Research 50 years ago and analysis by the former Snowy Mountains Authority led to the cessation of the cloud seeding program in the 1950s with non-definitive results. Formerly, cloud seeding was rejected in Australia on environmental grounds because of concerns about the pygmy possum. The claims of negative environmental impact are disputed by peer-reviewed research, as summarized by the International Weather Modification Association.

== History ==
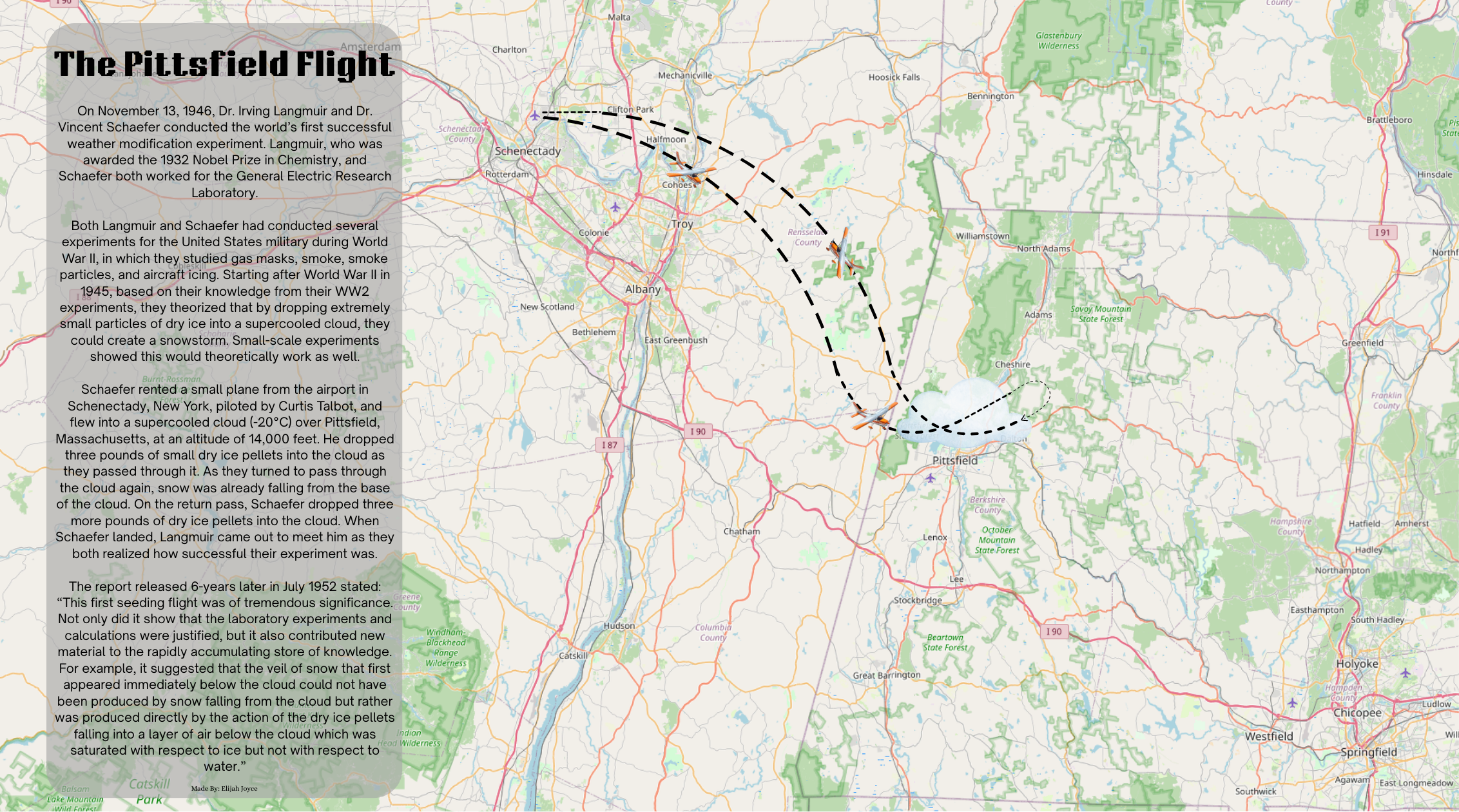
The Pittsfield Flight; the world's first successful weather modification experiment

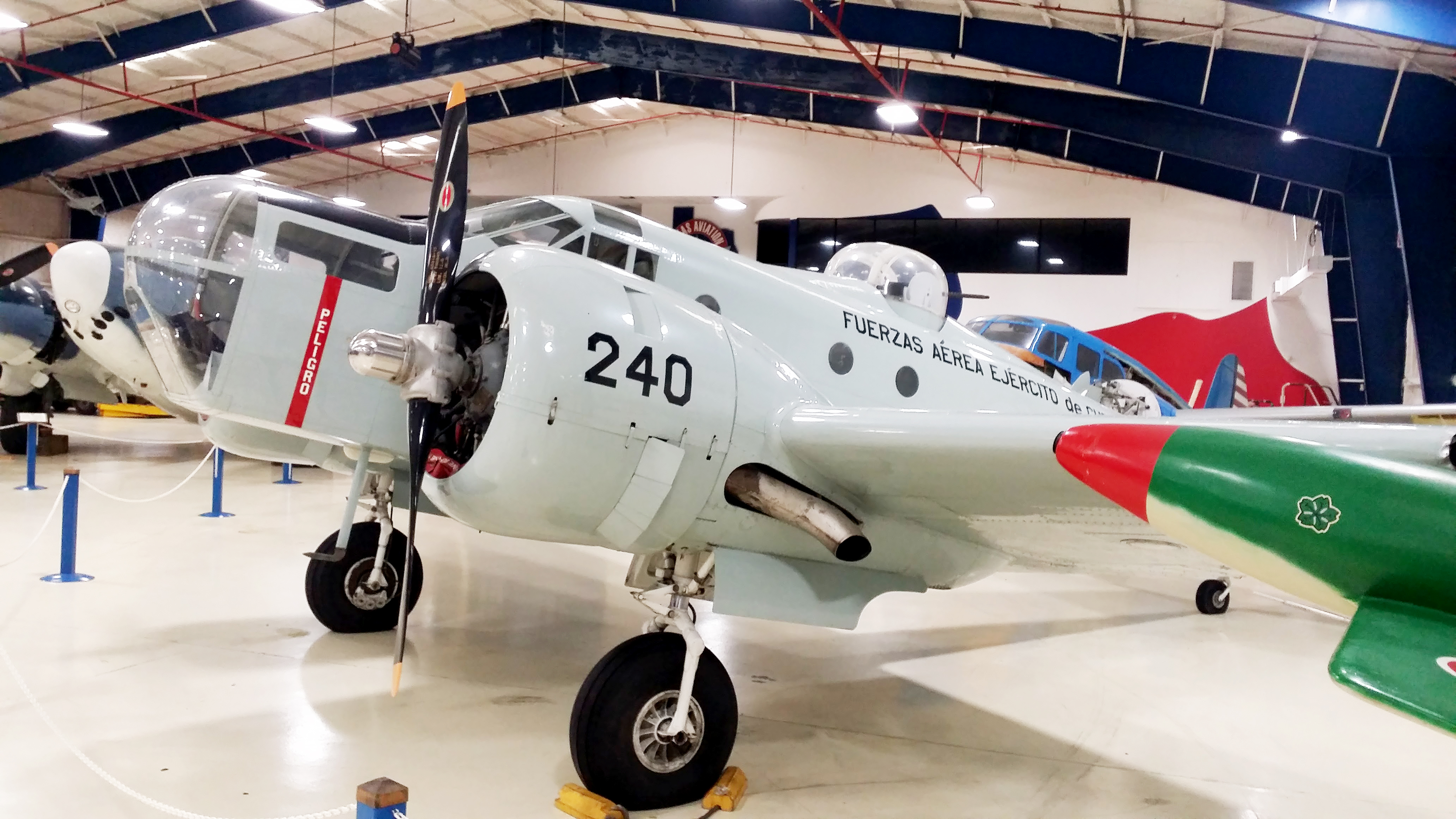
Beech 18 used dry ice for cloud seeding in the early postwar era US

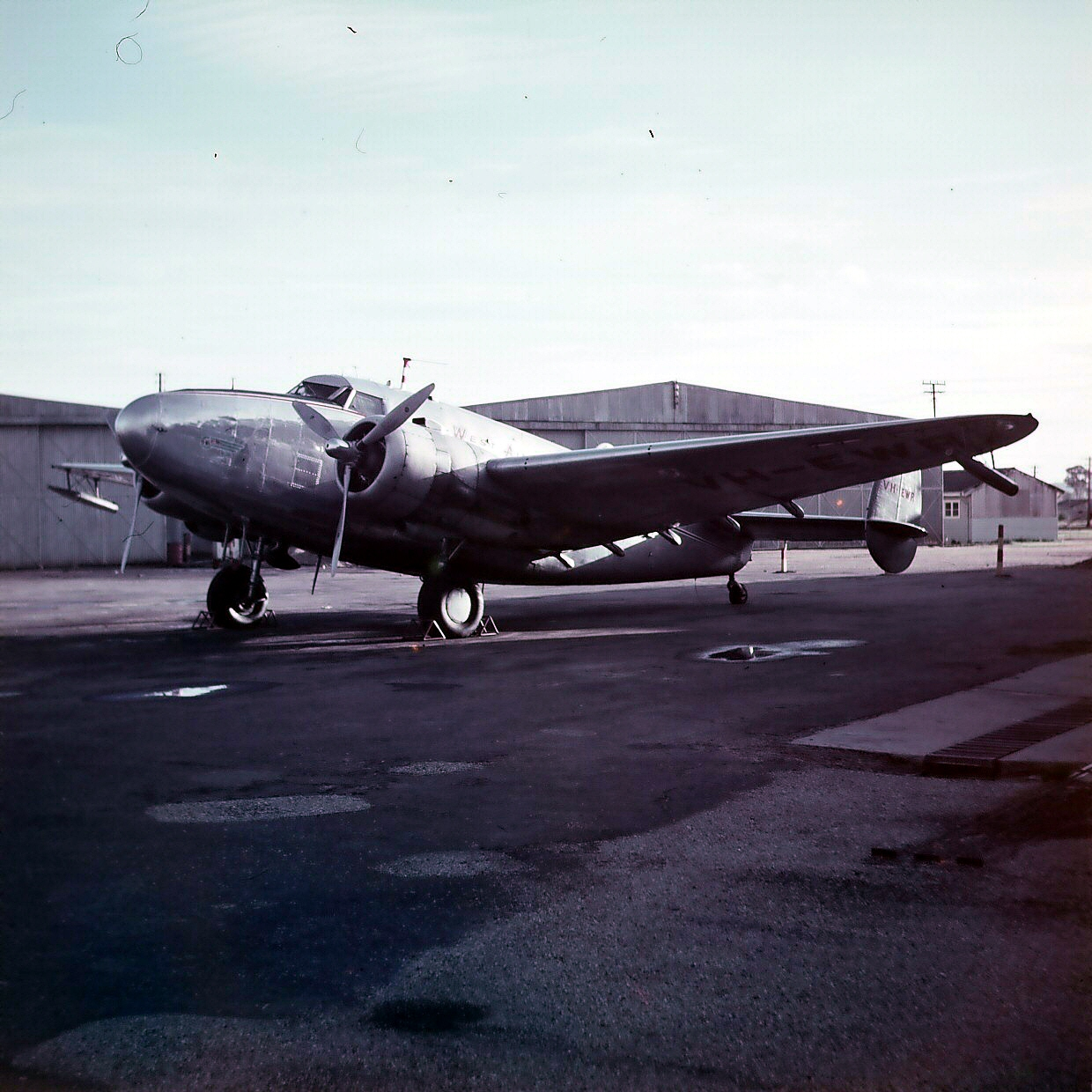
Lockheed 18 cloud seeding from Wagga Airport in 1958 Australia

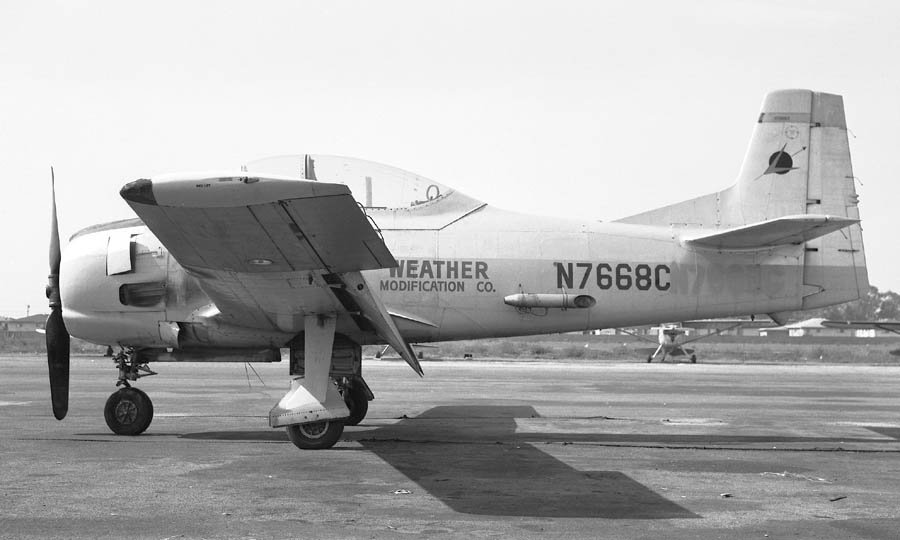
T-28A Trojan rain maker 1960 US

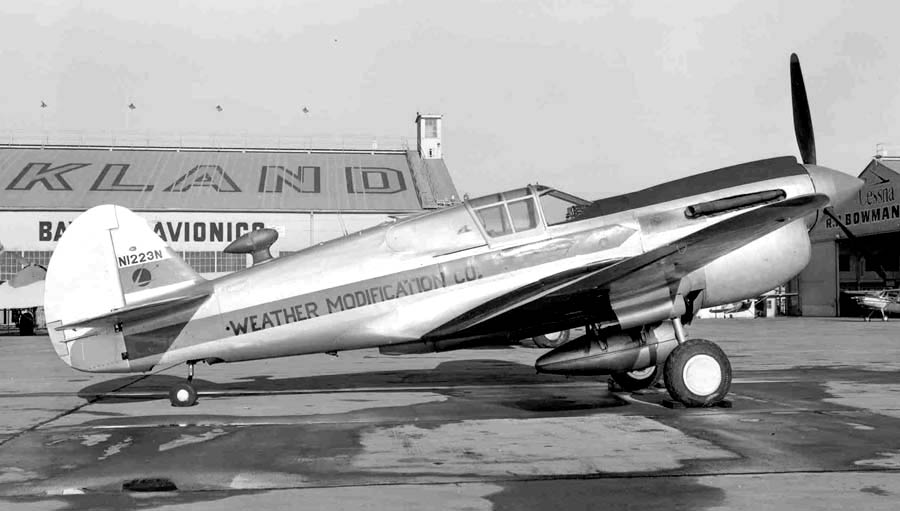
Curtiss P-40 rain maker 1964 US, now at Yanks Air Museum

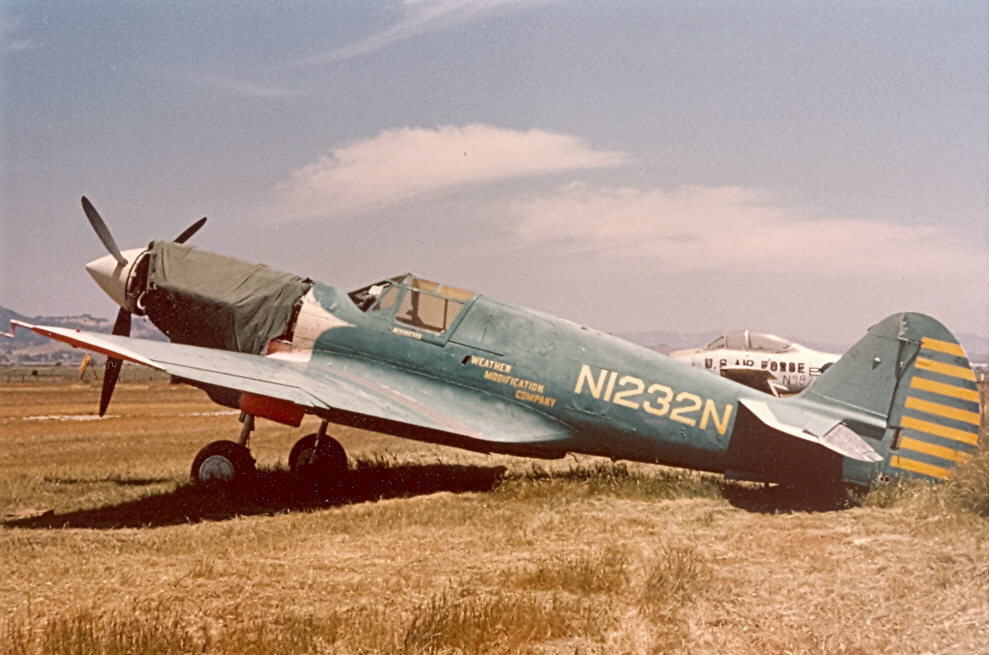
Curtiss P-40N N1232N Weather Modification Company - cloud seeding

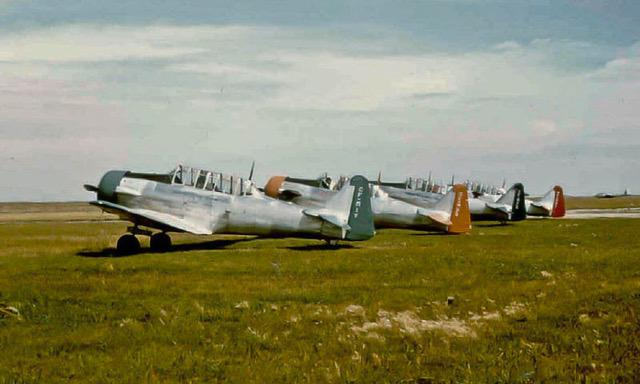
Harvard hail defence 1964 Canada

In 1891, Louis Gathmann suggested shooting liquid carbon dioxide into rain clouds to cause them to rain. During the 1930s, the Bergeron–Findeisen process theorized that supercooled water droplets present, while ice crystals are released into rain clouds, would cause rain. While researching aircraft icing, General Electric (GE)'s Vincent Schaefer and Irving Langmuir confirmed the theory. Schaefer discovered the principle of cloud seeding in July 1946 through a series of serendipitous events. Following ideas he and Langmuir generated while climbing Mt. Washington in New Hampshire, Schaefer, Langmuir's research associate, created a way of experimenting with supercooled clouds using a deep freeze unit of potential agents to stimulate ice crystal growth, i.e., table salt, talcum powder, soils, dust, and various chemical agents with minor effect. Then, on July 14, 1946, he wanted to try a few experiments at GE's Schenectady Research Lab.

He was dismayed to find that the deep freezer was not cold enough to produce a "cloud" using breath air. He decided to move the process along by adding a chunk of dry ice just to lower the temperature of his experimental chamber. To his astonishment, as soon as he breathed into the deep freezer, he noted a bluish haze, followed by an eye-popping display of millions of microscopic ice crystals, reflecting the strong light rays from the lamp illuminating a cross-section of the chamber. He instantly realized that he had discovered a way to change super-cooled water into ice crystals. The experiment was easily replicated, and he explored the temperature gradient to establish the −40 °C (−40 °F) limit for liquid water.

Within the month, Schaefer's colleague, the atmospheric scientist Bernard Vonnegut, was credited with discovering another method for "seeding" super-cooled cloud water. Vonnegut accomplished his discovery at the desk, looking up information in a basic chemistry text and then tinkering with silver and iodide chemicals to produce silver iodide. Together with Professor Henry Chessin, of SUNY Albany, a crystallographer, he co-authored a publication in Science and received a patent in 1975. Both methods were adopted for use in cloud seeding during 1946 while working for GE in the state of New York.

Schaefer's method altered a cloud's heat budget; Vonnegut's altered formative crystal structure, an ingenious property related to a good match in lattice constant between the two types of crystal. (The crystallography of ice later played a role in Vonnegut's brother Kurt Vonnegut's novel Cat's Cradle). The first attempt to modify natural clouds in the field through "cloud seeding" began during a flight that began in upstate New York on 13 November 1946. Schaefer was able to cause snow to fall near Mount Greylock in western Massachusetts after he dumped six pounds (2.5 kg) of dry ice into the target cloud from a plane after a 60-mile (100 km) easterly chase from the Schenectady County Airport.

Dry ice and silver iodide agents are effective in changing super-cooled clouds' physical chemistry, and thus useful in augmenting winter snowfall over mountains and, under certain conditions, in lightning and hail suppression. While not a new technique, hygroscopic seeding for enhancement of rainfall in warm clouds is enjoying a revival, based on positive indications from research in South Africa, Mexico, and elsewhere. The hygroscopic material most commonly used is table salt. It is postulated that hygroscopic seeding causes the droplet size spectrum in clouds to become more maritime (bigger drops) and less continental, stimulating rainfall through coalescence. From 1967 to 1972, the U.S. military's Operation Popeye cloud-seeded silver iodide to extend the monsoon season over North Vietnam, specifically the Ho Chi Minh Trail. The operation extended the monsoon period an average of 30 to 45 days in the targeted areas. The 54th Weather Reconnaissance Squadron carried out the operation to "make mud, not war".

An attempt by the U.S. military to modify hurricanes in the Atlantic basin using cloud seeding in the 1960s was called Project STORMFURY. Scientists tested four hurricanes across eight days and observed decreased wind speeds of 10% to 30% on four of these days. They originally attributed the lack of results to faulty execution, but the results came into question because of the lack of supercooled water in the hurricane and the inability to determine if the effects were due to human intervention or the natural processes of hurricanes.

Two federal agencies have supported various weather modification research projects, which began in the early 1960s: The United States Bureau of Reclamation (Reclamation; Department of the Interior) and the National Oceanic and Atmospheric Administration (NOAA; Department of Commerce). Reclamation sponsored several cloud-seeding research projects under the umbrella of Project Skywater from 1964 to 1988, and NOAA conducted the Atmospheric Modification Program from 1979 to 1993. The sponsored projects were carried out in several states and two countries (Thailand and Morocco), studying both winter and summer cloud seeding. From 1962 to 1988 Reclamation developed cloud seeding applied research to augment water supplies in the western U.S. The research focused on winter orographic seeding to enhance snowfall in the Rocky Mountains and Sierra Nevada, and precipitation in coast ranges of southern California. In California Reclamation partnered with the California Department of Water Resources (CDWR) to sponsor the Serra Cooperative Pilot Project (SCPP), based in Auburn, to conduct seeding experiments in the central Sierra. The University of Nevada and Desert Research Institute provided cloud physics, physical chemistry, and other field support. The High Plains Cooperative Pilot Project (HIPLEX) focused on convective cloud seeding to increase rainfall during the growing season in Montana, Kansas, and Texas from 1974 to 1979.

In 1979, the World Meteorological Organization and other member-states led by the Government of Spain conducted a Precipitation Enhancement Project (PEP) in Spain, with inconclusive results due probably to location selection issues.

Reclamation sponsored research at several universities, including Colorado State University, the Universities of Wyoming, Washington, UCLA, Utah, Chicago, NYU, Montana, and Colorado, and research teams at Stanford, Meteorology Research Inc., and Penn State University, and the South Dakota School of Mines and Technology, North Dakota, Texas A&M, Texas Tech, and Oklahoma. Cooperative efforts with state water resources agencies in California, Colorado, Montana, Kansas, Oklahoma, Texas, and Arizona assured that the applied research met state water management needs. HIPLEX also partnered with NASA, Environment Canada, and the National Center for Atmospheric Research (NCAR). From 2002 to 2006, in cooperation with six western states, Reclamation sponsored a small cooperative research program called the Weather Damage Modification Program.

In the U.S., funding for research has declined in the last two decades. But the Bureau of Reclamation sponsored a six-state research program from 2002 to 2006 called the "Weather Damage Modification Program". A 2003 study by the United States National Academy of Sciences urges a national research program to clear up remaining questions about weather modification's efficacy and practice.

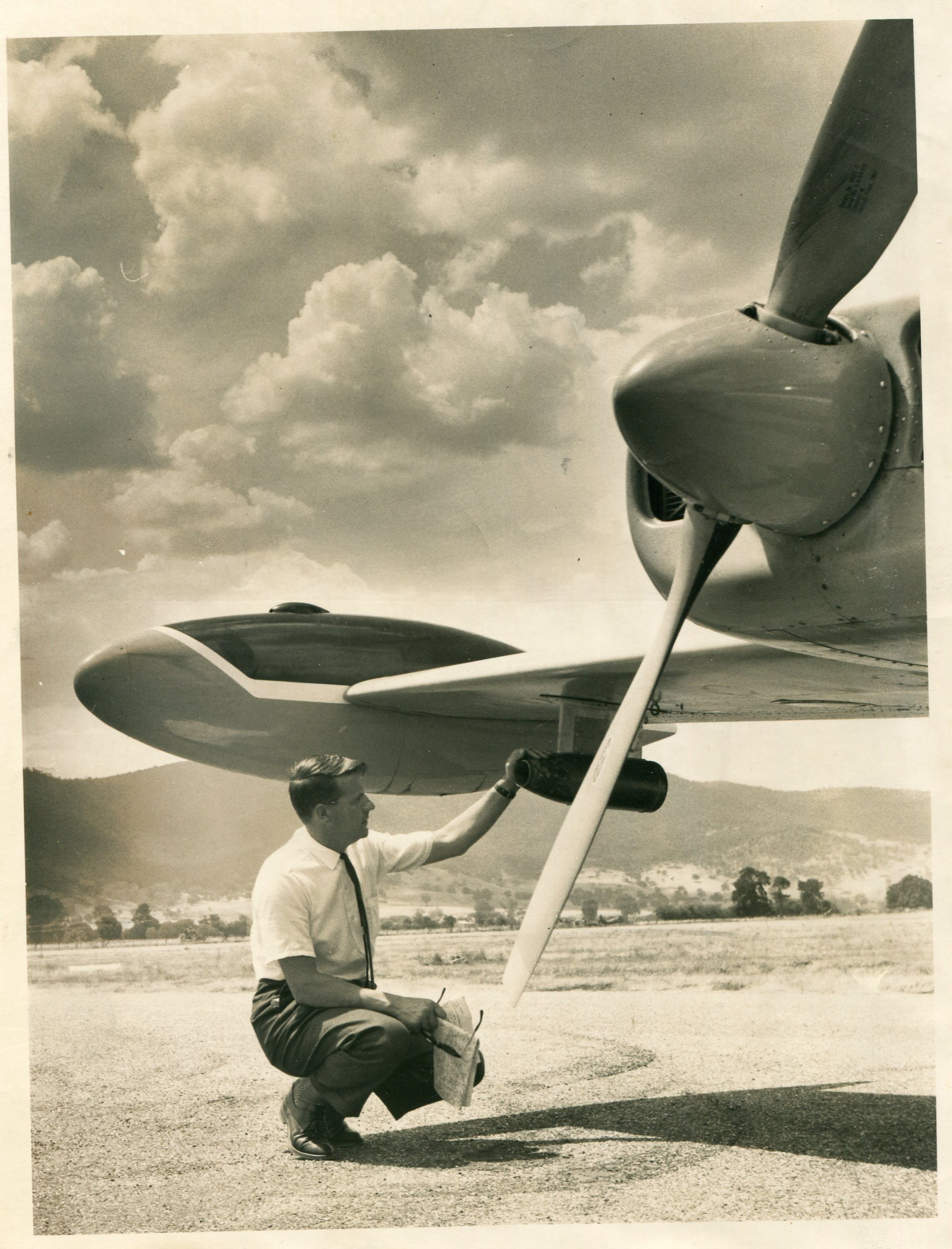
Cloud seeding at Corryong, Victoria Cessna 320 1966

In Australia, the Commonwealth Scientific and Industrial Research Organisation (CSIRO) conducted major trials between 1947 and the early-1960s:

- 1947–1952: CSIRO scientists dropped dry ice into the tops of cumulus clouds. The method worked reliably with clouds that were very cold, producing rain that would not have otherwise fallen.
- 1953–1956: CSIRO carried out similar trials in South Australia, Queensland and other states. Experiments used both ground-based and airborne silver iodide generators.
- Late 1950s and early 1960s: Cloud seeding in the Snowy Mountains, on the Cape York Peninsula in Queensland, in the New England District of New South Wales, and in the Warragamba catchment area west of Sydney.

Only the trial conducted in the Snowy Mountains produced statistically significant rainfall increases over the entire experiment.

Hydro Tasmania (at the time still known as the Hydro Electric Commission) began experimenting with cloud-seeding over lake catchments in central Tasmania in the early 1960s in order to determine if their electricity-producing dams could be kept at high water levels through cloud seeding. Tasmania proved to be one place where cloud seeding was highly effective. Various trials were undertaken between 1964 and 2005, and again between 2009 and 2016, but none have taken place since then. Hydro Tasmania also undertook soil and water survey samples and found negligible trace elements of the materials used for cloud seeding (such as silver iodine), and determined it did not have a detrimental effect on the environment.

An Austrian study to use silver iodide seeding for hail prevention ran during 1981–2000, and the technique is still actively deployed there.

== Aircraft types ==
Cloud seeding aircraft are specially modified airplanes designed to disperse seeding agents, such as silver iodide flares, hygroscopic salts, or dry ice, into suitable clouds to enhance precipitation or suppress hail. These aircraft are typically equipped with wing-mounted flare racks, underwing or fuselage dispensers, meteorological sensors, GPS navigation systems, and dedicated mission control equipment to ensure accurate and safe operations. Any aircraft used for cloud seeding must be approved and modified in accordance with the applicable aviation regulations FAA, EASA etc., with the installation of seeding systems documented through the appropriate certification and airworthiness procedures. Suitable cloud seeding aircraft should provide good low-speed handling, stable flight characteristics in turbulent weather, adequate payload capacity, sufficient endurance, and the ability to operate safely at the altitudes where cloud seeding missions are conducted.

=== Important aircraft characteristics ===
- stable flight characteristics in turbulent atmosphere
- safe operation at all operating cloud seeding altitudes
- sutable low-speed operation handling
- well-equipped IFR setup
- good high speed flying to the cloud location
- sufficient endurance
- weather radar

Typical aircraft used in cloud seeding operations by catergory:

=== SEP (Single-Engine Piston) ===
- Cessna 182 Skylane
- Cessna 206 Stationair
- Cessna 210 Centurion
- Beechcraft Bonanza
- Piper PA-24 Comanche
- Piper PA-32R Saratoga
- Piper PA-46 Mirage

=== MEP (Multi-Engine Piston) ===
- Piper PA-31
- Piper PA-34
- Piper PA-60
- Beechcraft 58
- Beechcraft 60
- Beechcraft 88
- Cessna 320
- Cessna 336
- Cessna 340
- Cessna 414
- Cessna 421
- Partenavia P.68
- Aero Commander 500

=== ME Turbine (Twin Turboprop) ===
- Beechcraft King Air 90
- Beechcraft King Air 200
- Beechcraft King Air 350
- Piper Cheyenne
- Mitsubishi MU-2
- Commander 690

=== Larger Utility and Transport ===
- Antonov An-26
- Antonov An-30
- Antonov An-32
- Ilyushin Il-18
- C-123 Provider
- C-130 Hercules
- Xi'an MA60
- Basler BT-67
- Shaanxi Y-8
- CASA C-212 Aviocar

=== Jet aircraft ===
- Boeing WC-135
- Lockheed C-141
- Ilyushin Il-76
- Tupolev Tu-16
- Bombardier Challenger
- Gulfstream II
- Gulfstream III
- Learjet 35

=== Military Jet aircraft ===
- Dassault Alpha Jet
- Fouga CM.170 Magister
- Cessna T-37 Tweet
- Northrop T-38 Talon

All of these aircraft are no longer in operational use for cloud seeding today, and some of them were used only in research or experimental weather modification programs.

== Operations by country ==
=== Asia ===
==== China ====
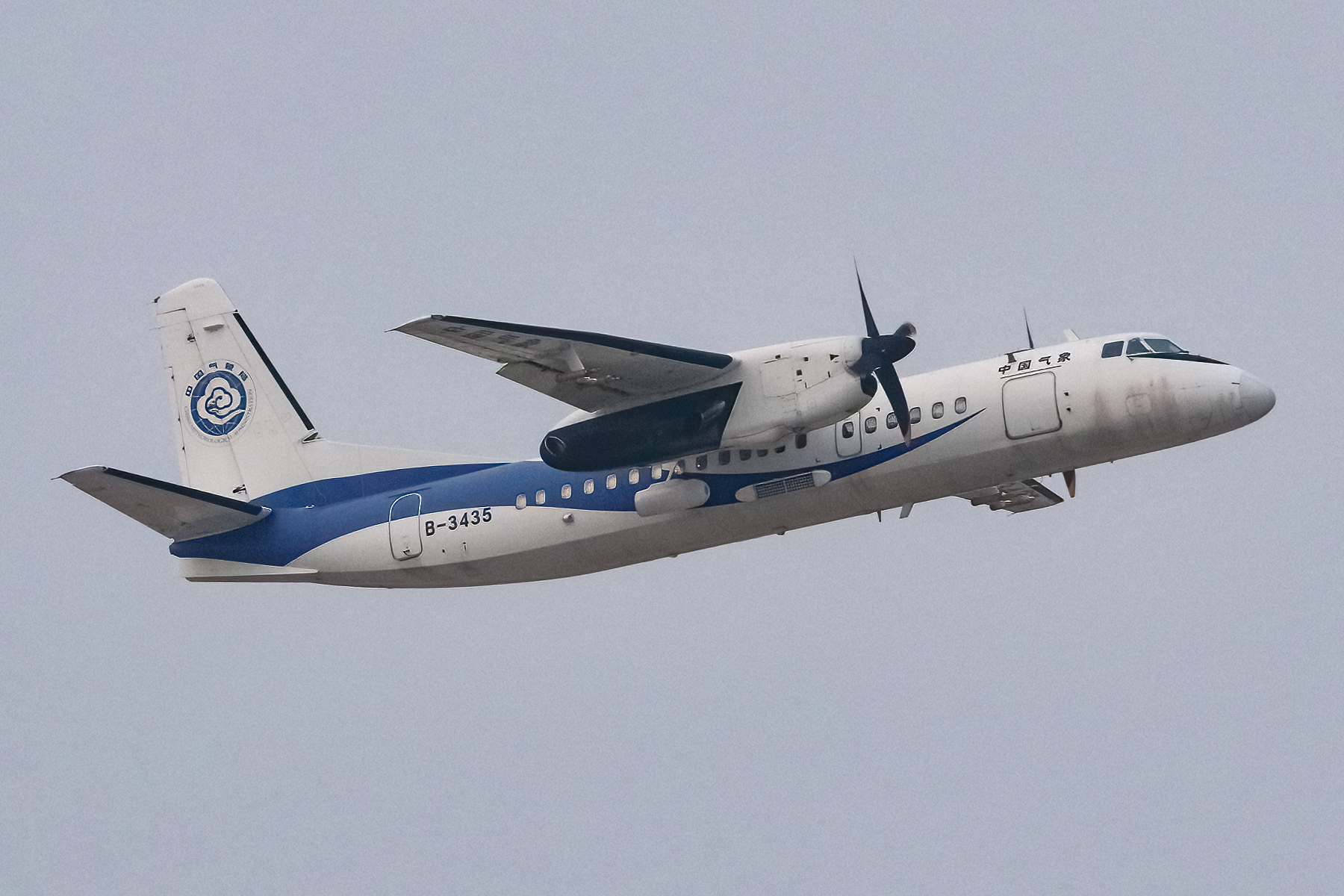
Xian MA60 cloud seeding aircraft of China Meteorological Administration

The largest cloud seeding system is in the People's Republic of China. They utilise it to increase the amount of rain over several increasingly arid regions, including its capital city, Beijing, by firing silver iodide rockets into the sky where rain is desired. There is even political strife caused by neighbouring regions that accuse each other of "stealing rain" using cloud seeding. China used cloud seeding in Beijing just before the 2008 Olympic Games in order to have a dry Olympic season. In February 2009, China also blasted iodide sticks over Beijing to artificially induce snowfall after four months of drought, and blasted iodide sticks over other areas of northern China to increase snowfall. The snowfall in Beijing lasted for approximately three days and led to the closure of 12 main roads around Beijing. At the end of October 2009, Beijing said it had its earliest snowfall since 1987 due to cloud seeding. According to a research paper from Tsinghua University, "the Chinese weather authorities used weather modification to ensure the sky was clear and lower air pollution" on 1 July 2021, as the Chinese Communist party celebrated its centenary with a major celebration. The celebration took place in Tiananmen Square. The paper was published on 26 November 2021 in a peer-review journal called Environment Science. The research shows that the Chinese government used cloud-seeding techniques to force rainfall the evening before the celebration event. This rainfall lowered the amount of PM2.5 pollution by more than two-thirds. That helped improve the air quality at the time from "moderate" to "good".

==== India ====
In India, cloud seeding operations were conducted during the years 1983, 1984–87, and 1993–94 by the Tamil Nadu Government due to severe drought. In the years 1999 to 2004, 2006 and 2010 Karnataka government attempted cloud seeding without much success. Cloud seeding operations were also conducted in 2003 and 2004 through in the state of Maharashtra with inconclusive results.

In October 2025, cloud seeding was conducted to improve the air quality over Delhi but the experiment yielded no significant results.

==== Iran ====
In 1946, the Iranian government tried to fertilize Iran's clouds with the help of Americans, but it was unsuccessful. Then in 1947, in Article 19 of the Law on Water and its Nationalisation, the then Ministry of Water and Electricity was obliged to provide the water needed by the country in various ways, including cloud fertilization. Accordingly, the Ministry of Energy between 1953 and 1957, in cooperation with a Canadian company and using aircraft and silver iodide compound fertilised the clouds that were over the Karaj and Jajrud dam area.

After the revolution of 1978, in the years 1989 to 1995, cloud fertilisation was carried out in a scattered manner using ground generators in the heights of Shirkuh, Yazd. Then, with the announcement of the Minister of Energy in February 1996, the National Center for Cloud Fertility Research and Studies was established in Yazd and officially started working in 1997.

==== Israel ====
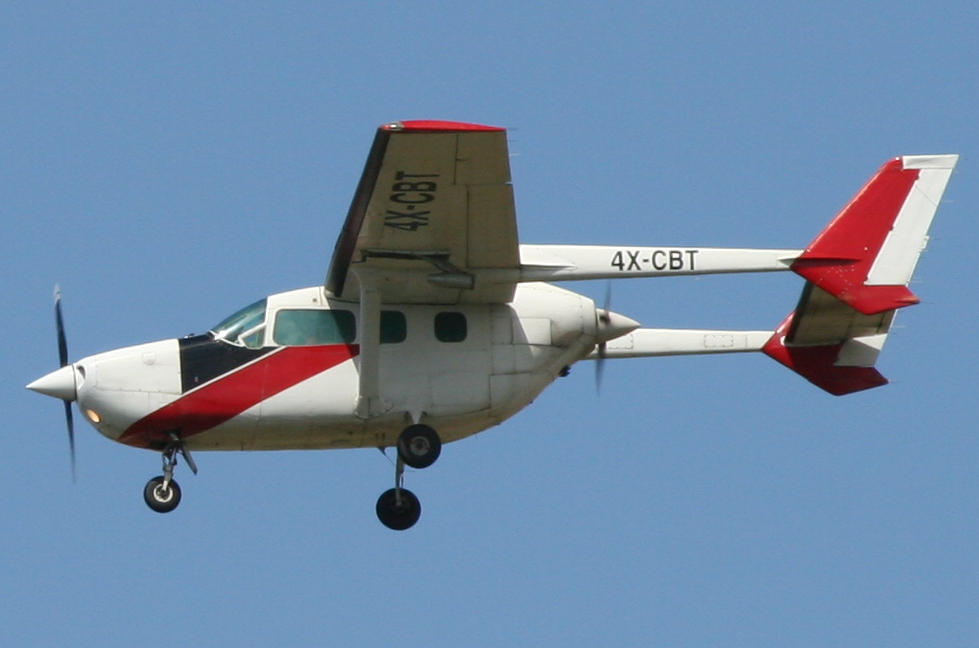
Cessna Skymaster 2015 Israel

Israel conducted experimental cloud seeding for seven years from 2014 to 2021. The practice involved emitting silver iodide from airplanes and ground stations and took place only in the northern parts of the country. Israel stopped the rain enhancement project in 2021 due to the experiment data showing that the practice was largely ineffective and expensive, and because there had been some recent years of unrelated significant rainfall.

==== Kuwait ====
To counter drought and a growing population in a desert region, Kuwait is embarking on its own cloud seeding program, with the local Environment Public Authority conducting a study to gauge its viability locally.

==== North Korea ====
Cloud seeding projects have been carried out in North Korea since the 1960s. Their initial purpose was to ensure a steady supply of water for the hydroelectric power stations located in the South Hamgyong Province. In the following decades, however, while research on utilising cloud resources was carried out, seeding operations themselves were almost nonexistent. Cloud seeding operations were prioritised again in the twenty-first century due to socio-economic requirements, and to mitigate natural disasters such as droughts and hailstorms. More recently, between 2017 and 2020, the Chungsan region was selected to carry out cloud seeding experiments over, which were seen to have enhanced precipitation in the region.

==== Pakistan ====
Pakistan has undergone its first-ever artificial rain experiment using cloud seeding, in a move carried out with the help of the United Arab Emirates. There was drizzle in 'at least 10 areas' of Lahore, consistently ranked the most polluted city in the world.

On Friday 15 November 2024, Pakistan successfully conducted a cloud seeding operation using locally developed technology, resulting in artificial rainfall to tackle the region’s smog crisis. The Meteorological Department confirmed rainfall in Jhelum, Gujar Khan, Chakwal, and Talagang, attributing it to the cloud seeding effort. Cloud seeding was conducted around 14:00, with subsequent rainfall observed within hours in Jhelum and Gujar Khan.

==== Sri Lanka ====
In January 2019, the Sri Lanka Air Force (SLAF) and Ministry of Power, Energy and Business Development signed an agreement for a cloud seeding project, created in response to lower water levels for hydroelectric power due to dry weather. In February of that year, a group of officials from the SLAF, Ceylon Electricity Board, and meteorology and irrigation departments were sent to Thailand to study rainmaking projects carried out by the Department of Royal Rainmaking and Agricultural Aviation. On 22 March a Harbin Y-12 flew over the Maskeliya Reservoir at 2,400 m (7,900 ft), dispersing cloud seeding chemicals. Rain arrived the next day on 23 March, though project members had expected it to appear earlier on the 22nd. News First proclaimed that the pilot project had "proven to be a success", while Mongabay described it as a "failed attempt" that had "fallen short" and highlighted various climate experts who recommended that the government conduct more research into the project's potential environmental effects before proceeding further.

==== United Arab Emirates ====
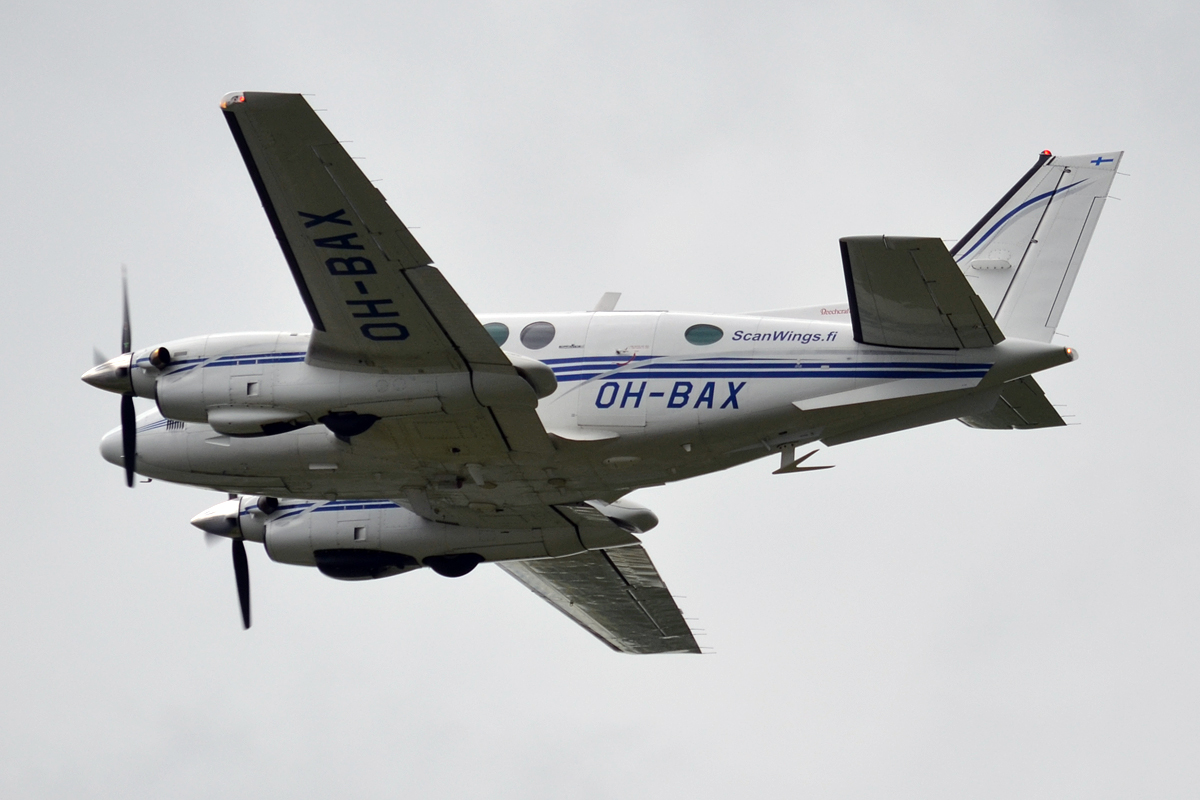
Beechcraft King Air C90 used for cloud seeding operations in UAE

Cloud seeding in the United Arab Emirates is a weather modification technique used by the government to address water challenges in the country. Cloud seeding is also referred to as man made precipitation and artificial rain making. The United Arab Emirates is one of the first countries in the Persian Gulf region to use cloud seeding technology. UAE scientists use cloud seeding technology to address the country's water insecurity, which stems from the extremely hot climate. They use weather radars to continuously monitor the atmosphere of the country. Forecasters and scientists have estimated that cloud seeding operations can enhance rainfall by as much as 30-35% percent in a clear atmosphere, and up to 10-15% in a more humid atmosphere. This practice has caused concerns regarding the impact on the environment because it is difficult to predict its long-term global implications.

Rain through cloud seeding in Dubai

=== Southeast Asia ===
In Southeast Asia, open-burning haze pollutes the regional environment. Cloud seeding has been used to improve the air quality by encouraging rainfall. On 20 June 2013, Indonesia said it will begin cloud-seeding operations following reports from Singapore and Malaysia that smog caused by forest and bush fires in Sumatra have disrupted daily activities in the neighbouring countries. On 25 June 2013, hailstones were reported to have fallen over some parts of Singapore. Despite NEA denials, some believe that the hailstones are the result of cloud seeding in Indonesia.

==== Indonesia ====
In Jakarta, cloud seeding was tested in 2013 to minimize flood risk in anticipation of heavy floods, according to the Agency for the Assessment and Application of Technology. The practice has continued up to March 2025, national and provincial disaster agencies used cloud seeding over the sea north of Jakarta, with the aim of shifting rainfall away from land and toward the sea, costing about 200 million rupiahs (US$12,292) for each flyover.

==== Malaysia ====
In Malaysia, cloud seeding was first used in 1988 for three purposes: filling up dams, lessening the effects of haze, and fighting forest fires. In 2015, cloud seeding was done daily in Malaysia since the haze began in early-August. Johor Water Regulatory Body focused to produce rain over dams with critically low water levels. They used Cessna 340 with tubes of ioidised salt, flying from their operation base at Senai International Airport.

==== Thailand ====
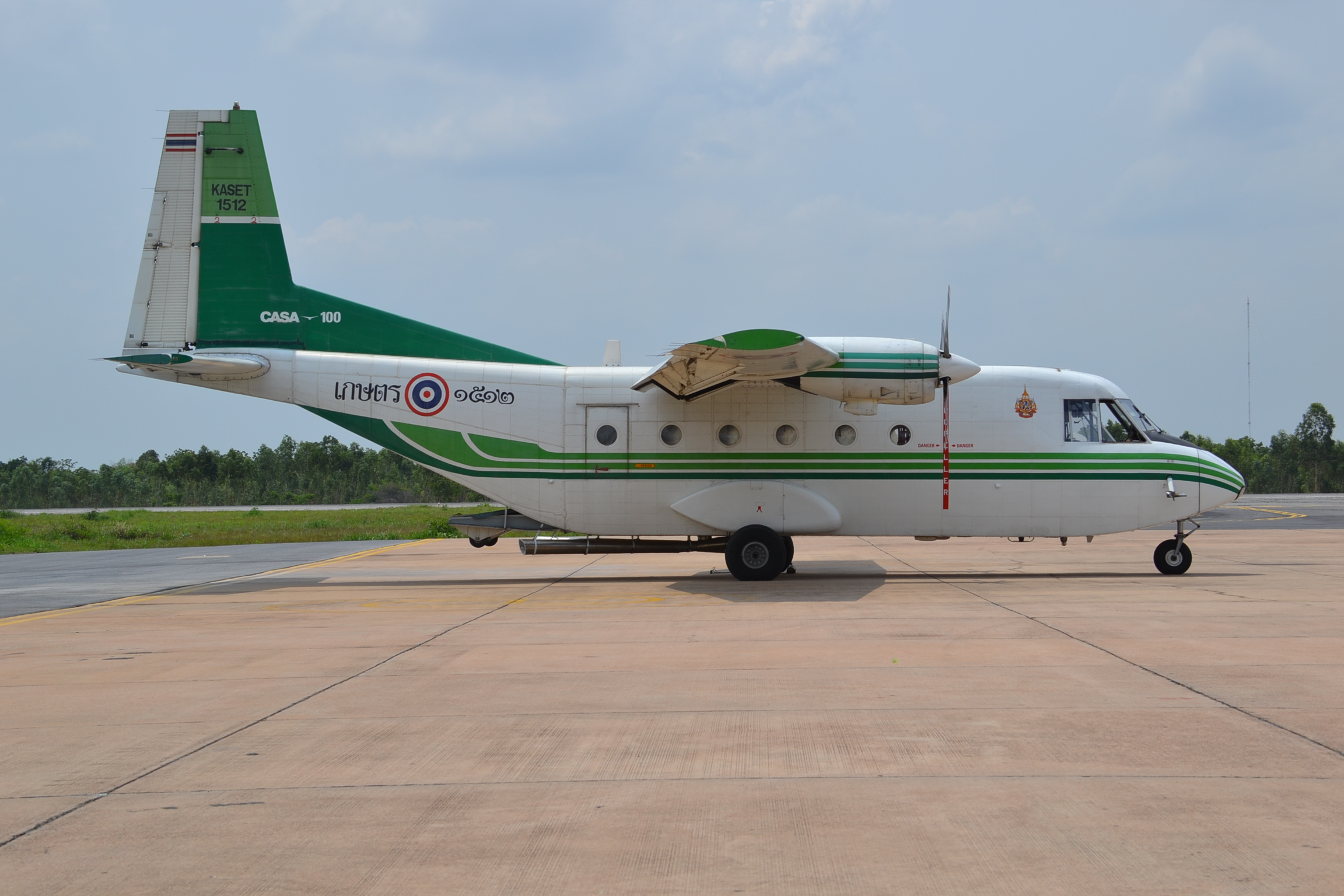
CASA C-212 Aviocar of KASET Thailand

The Thailand Royal Rainmaking Project (Thai: โครงการฝนหลวง, RTGS: khrongkan fon luang) was initiated in November 1955 by King Bhumibol Adulyadej. Thai farmers repeatedly suffered the effects of drought. The king resolved to do something about it and proposed a solution to the dearth of rain: artificial rainmaking, or cloud seeding. The program is run by the Department of Royal Rainmaking and Agricultural Aviation. Thailand started a rain-making project in the late-1950s, known today as the Royal Rainmaking Project. Its first efforts scattered sea salt in the air to catch the humidity and dry ice to condense the humidity to form clouds. The project took about ten years of experiments and refinement. The first field operations began in 1969 above Khao Yai National Park. Since then the Thai government claims that rainmaking has been successfully applied throughout Thailand and neighbouring countries. The king received recognition for the Royal Rainmaking Project from the Eureka organization in 2001 for an invention that is beneficial to the world. In 2009, Jordan received permission from Thailand to use the technique. On 12 October 2005 the European Patent Office granted to King Bhumibol Adulyadej the patent EP 1 491 088 Weather modification by royal rainmaking technology. The budget of the Department of Royal Rainmaking and Agricultural Aviation in FY2019 was 2,224 million baht. Since at least January 2019, cloud seeding was leveraged to suppress PM 2.5 air pollution across Thailand.

==== Vietnam ====
In Vietnam, during the leadup to and initial stages of the Battle of Điện Biên Phủ in 1954, the French Far East Expeditionary Corps looked into the possibility of using cloud seeding to impede Việt Minh flow of supplies through Route Provinciale 41, a dirt road leading into Điện Biên Phủ that would become more difficult to navigate during the rainy season. General Henri Navarre authorized research into using cloud seeding this way on March 16, just before the outbreak of the battle, and a test commenced the following month. Results were disappointing; while it did not take long for the rain clouds to form and release precipitation, they often drifted away from Route Provinciale 41 in the process, reducing their ability to hinder Việt Minh logistics.

=== North America ===
==== United States ====
In the United States, cloud seeding is used to increase precipitation in areas experiencing drought, to reduce the size of hailstones that form in thunderstorms, and to reduce the amount of fog in and around airports. In the summer of 1948, the usually humid city of Alexandria, Louisiana, under Mayor Carl B. Close, seeded a cloud with dry ice at the municipal airport during a drought; quickly 22 mm (0.85 in) of rain fell.

Major ski resorts occasionally use cloud seeding to induce snowfall. Eleven western states and one Canadian province (Alberta) had ongoing weather modification operational programs in 2012. In 2006, an US$8.8 million project began in Wyoming to examine cloud seeding's effects on snowfall over Wyoming's Medicine Bow, Sierra Madre, and Wind River mountain ranges.

In Oregon, Portland General Electric used Hood River seeding to produce snow for hydro power in 1974-1975. The results were substantial, but caused an undue burden on the locals, who experienced overpowering rainfall, causing street collapses and mudslides. PGE discontinued its seeding practices the next year.

In 1978, the U.S. signed the Environmental Modification Convention, which bans the use of weather modification for hostile purposes.

As of 2022, seven agencies in California are conducting cloud seeding operations using silver iodide, including the Sacramento Municipal Utility District, which began employing the technique in 1969 to increase the water supply to its hydroelectric power plants, and reported that it results in "an average of 3 to 10% increase in [Sierra Nevada] snowpack".

==== Canada ====
During the sixties, Irving P. Krick & Associates operated a successful cloud seeding operation in the area around Calgary, Alberta. This utilised both aircraft and ground-based generators that pumped silver iodide into the atmosphere in an attempt to reduce the threat of hail damage. Ralph Langeman, Lynn Garrison, and Stan McLeod, all ex-members of the RCAF's 403 Squadron, attending the University of Alberta, spent their summers flying hail suppression. The Alberta Hail Suppression Project is continuing with C$3 million a year in funding from insurance companies to reduce hail damage in southern Alberta.

=== Europe ===
==== Bulgaria ====
Bulgaria operates a national network of hail protection, silver iodide rocket sites, strategically located in agricultural areas such as the rose valley. Each site protects an area of 10 sq. km (4 sq. mi.), the density of the site clusters is such that at least 2 sites will be able to target a single hail cloud, initial detection of hail cloud formation to firing of the rockets is typically 7–10 minutes in its entire process with a view to seed the formation of much smaller hailstones, high in the atmosphere that will melt before reaching ground level.

Data collated since the 1960s suggests huge agricultural sector losses are avoided yearly with the protection system, unseeded the hail will flatten entire regions, with seeding this can be reduced to minor leaf damage from the smaller hailstones that failed to melt.

==== France and Spain ====
Cloud seeding began in France during the 1950s with the intent of reducing hail damage to crops. The ANELFA () project consists of local agencies acting within a non-profit organization. A similar project in Spain is managed by the Consorcio por la Lucha Antigranizo de Aragon. The success of the French program was supported by analysis made by Jean Dessens based on insurance data; that of the Spanish program in studies conducted by the Spanish Agricultural Ministry. However, Jean Dessens's results were heavily criticized and doubt was cast on the effectiveness of ground generator seeding. ()

==== Russia ====
The Soviet Union created a specifically designed version of the Antonov An-30 aerial survey aircraft, the An-30M Sky Cleaner, with eight containers of solid carbon dioxide in the cargo area plus external pods containing meteorological cartridges that could be fired into clouds. Russian government spends millions on 'cloud seeding' technology to ensure it doesn't rain on May Day public holiday. A single contractor was hired to employ a technique which involves dispersing clouds and forcing them to rain before the time they naturally would – dropping the rain on other places and at other times, so they don't affect specific events. In 2020, Russia used cloud seeding to help fight Siberian forest fires. The Russian government has also used cloud seeding technology in Crimea to alleviate drought which was caused as a result of Ukraine blocking the Crimean Canal. Russia published a review of the weather electromagnetic correction technology in 2015, which was developed in the 1980s in the USSR and shares technology with India.

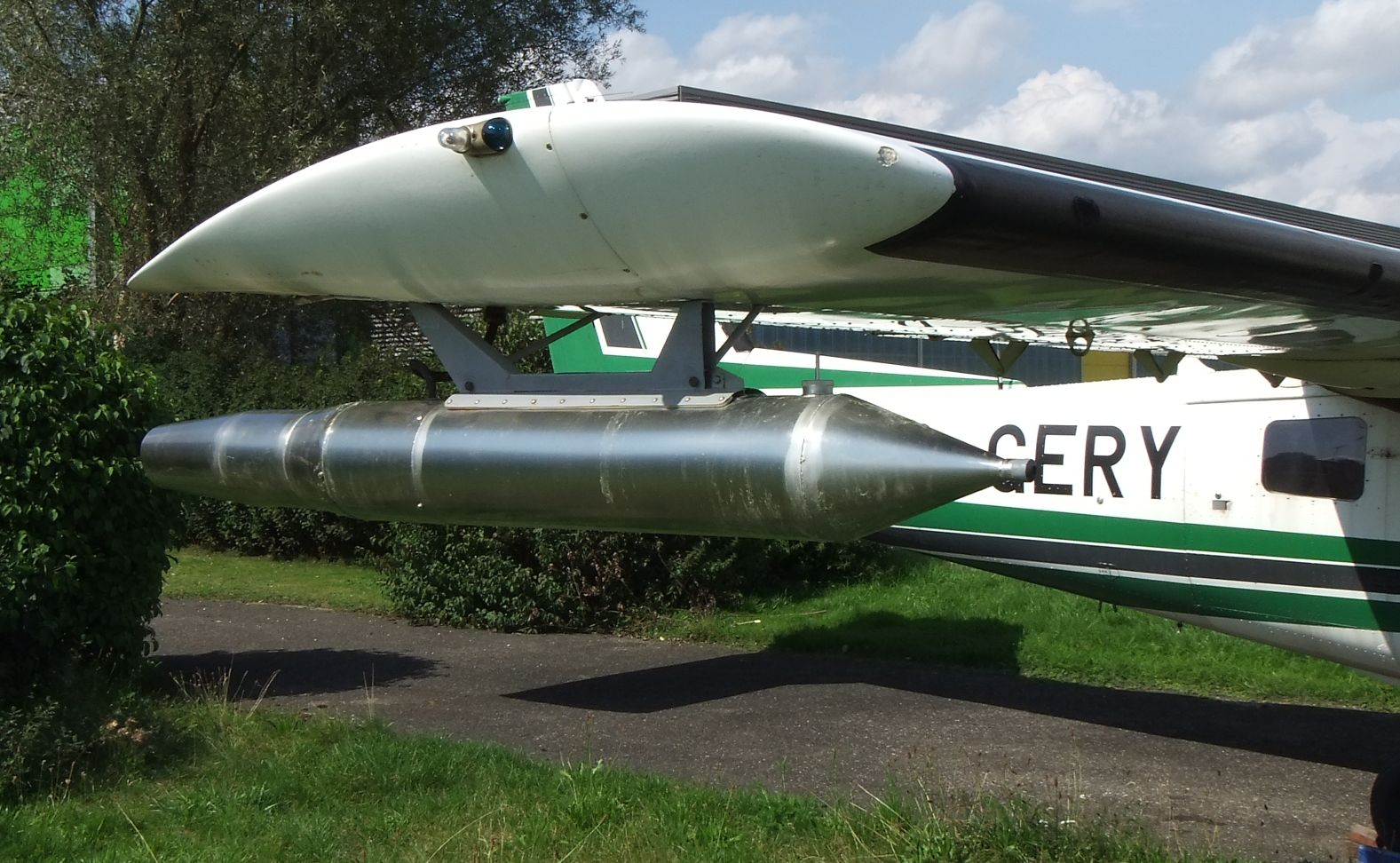
Partenavia P.68 Hagelflieger - Germany

==== Germany ====
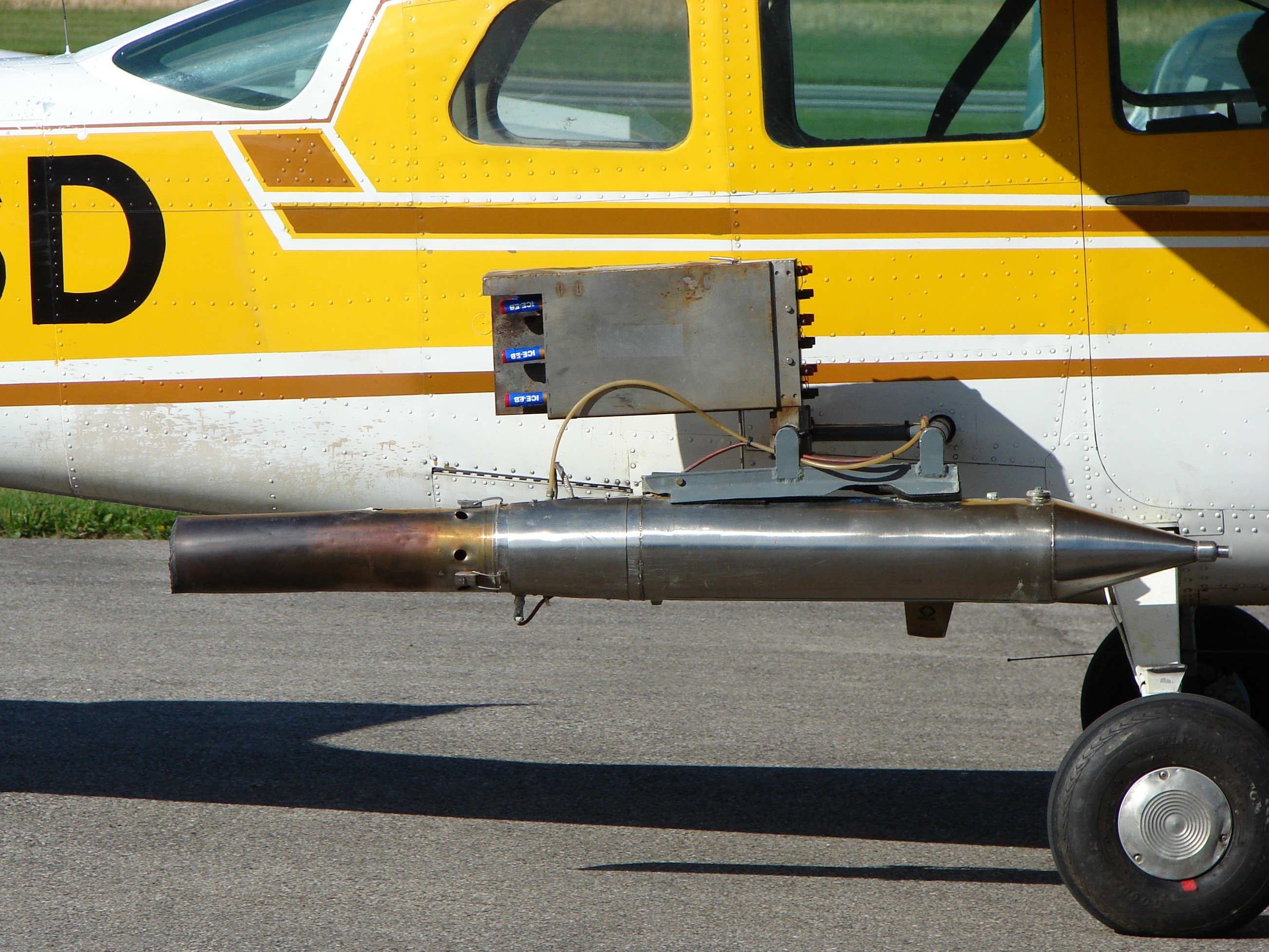
Cessna 210 2006 Austria

In Germany civic engagement societies organize cloud seeding on a region level. A registered society maintains aircraft for cloud seeding to protect agricultural areas from hail in the district Rosenheim, the district Miesbach, the district Traunstein (all located in southern Bavaria, Germany) and the district Kufstein (located in Tyrol, Austria).

Cloud seeding is also used in Baden-Württemberg, a federal state particularly known for its winegrowing culture. The districts of Ludwigsburg, Heilbronn, Schwarzwald-Baar and Rems-Murr, as well as the cities Stuttgart and Esslingen participate in a program to prevent the formation of hailstones. Reports from a local insurance agency suggest that the cloud seeding activities in the Stuttgart area have prevented about €5 million in damages in 2015 while the project's annual upkeep is priced at only €325.000. Another society for cloud seeding operates in the district of Villingen-Schwenningen.

==== Austria ====
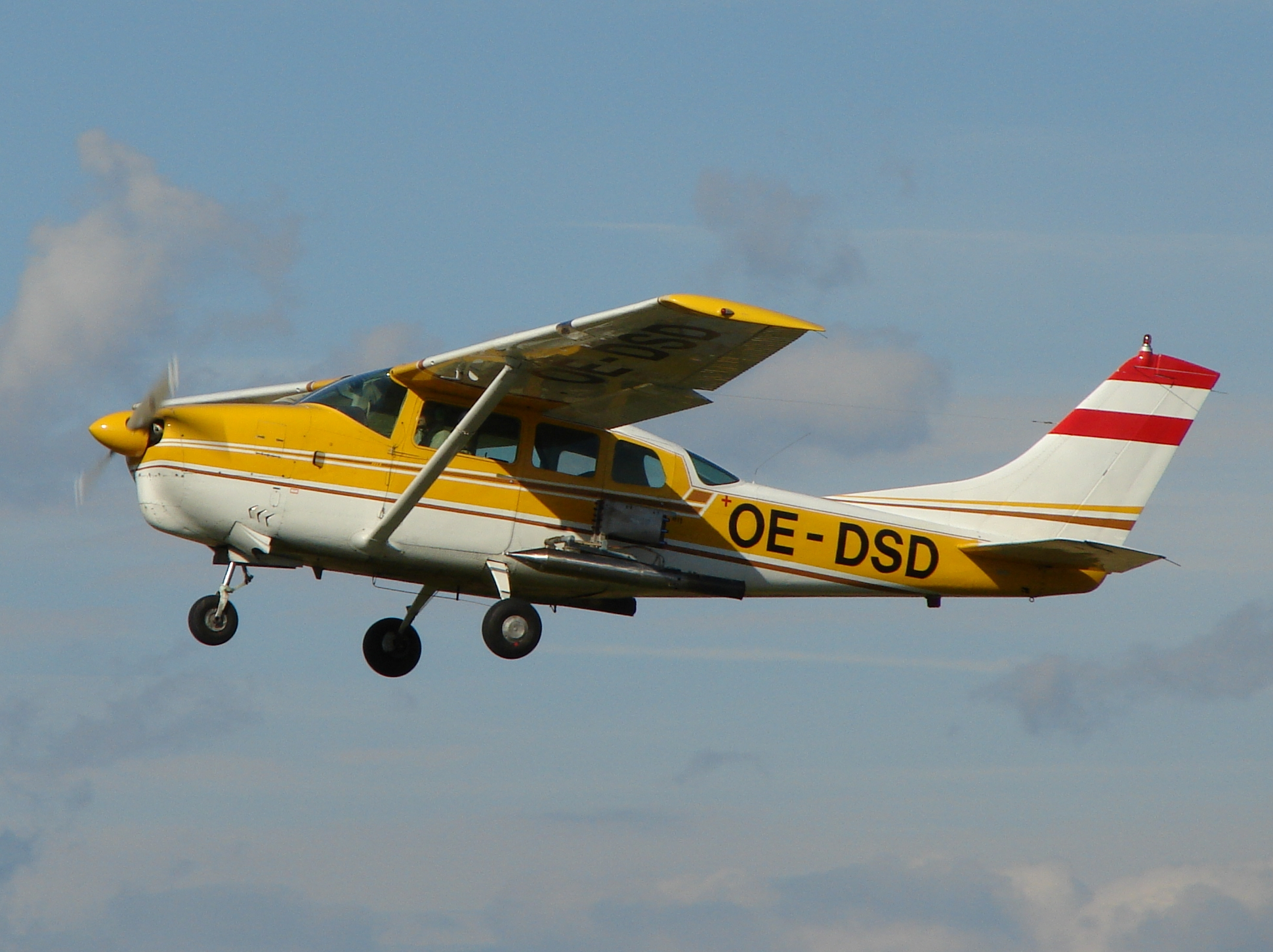
Cessna 210B Hagelflieger Austria

Austria has two hail defence organizations: Steirische Hagel Abwehr, with four aircraft: Cessna 182 and Südflug with three aircraft: Cessna 150L, Cessna 182P, Partenavia P.68 at Graz Airport.

==== Slovenia ====
Slovenia's oldest aeroclub Letalski Centre Maribor carries air defence against hail as a specialised EASA operation. The Cessna TU206G Turbo Stationair 6 II is equipped with external aggregates and flares for flying. Three crew members work in the operation. Two are the pilots in the plane and the third is the radar operator on the ground. The purpose of the defence is to prevent damage to farmland and cities in the areas of Styria and Prekmurje - aircraft hail suppression. They have been carrying out defence since 1983. Silver iodide is used as a reagent. The base is at Maribor Edvard Rusjan Airport. The activity is financed by local communities and the Ministry of Agriculture, it has great support among people and farmers from all over the countryside. Project's annual budget in 2025 was €346.922,73 with value added tax.

==== United Kingdom ====
Project Cumulus was a UK government initiative to investigate weather manipulation, in particular through cloud seeding experiments, operational between 1949 and 1952. A conspiracy theory has circulated that the Lynmouth flood of 1952 was caused by secret cloud seeding experiments carried out by the Royal Air Force. However, meteorologist Philip Eden has given several reasons why "it is preposterous to blame the Lynmouth flood on such experiments".

=== Australia ===
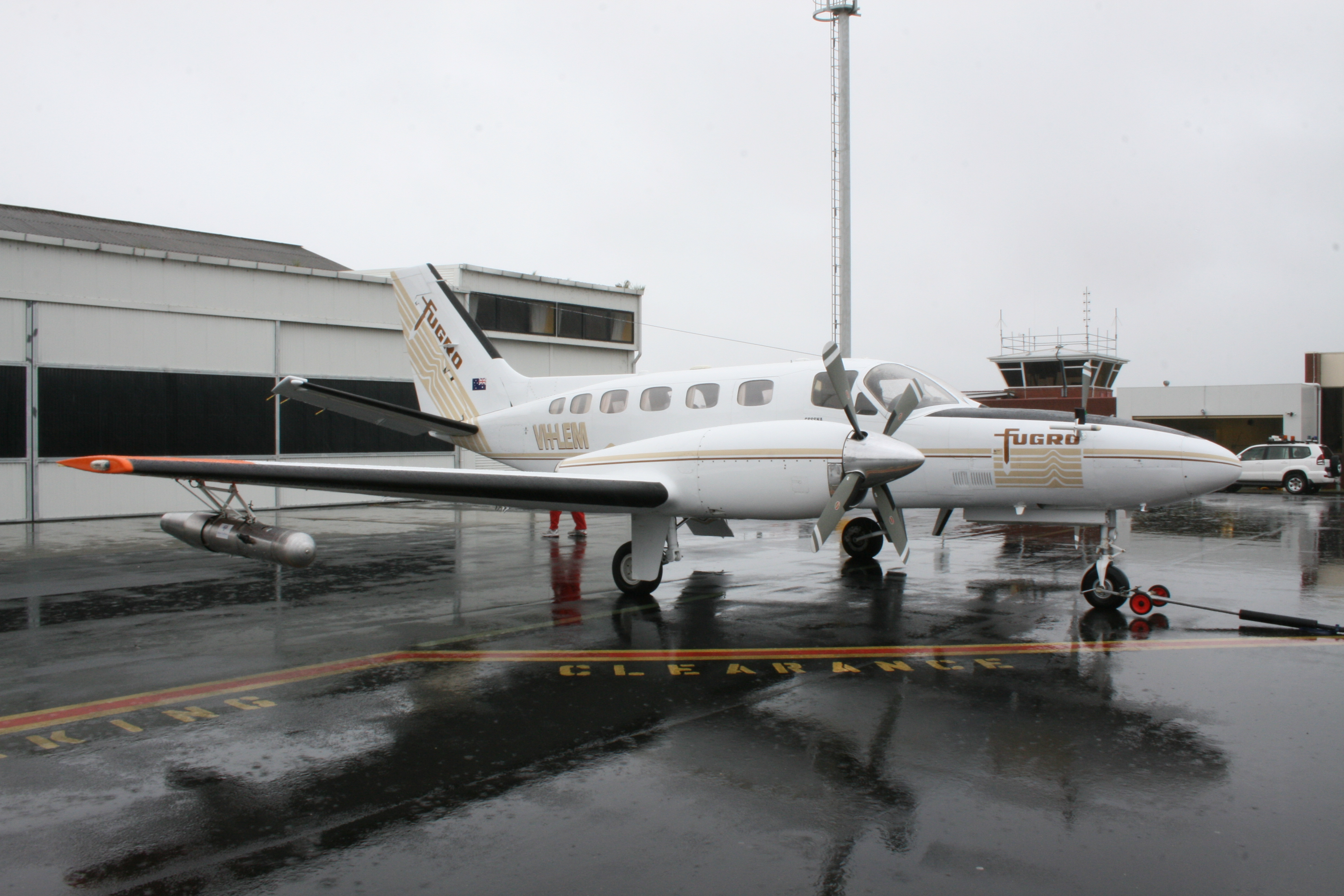
Cessna 441 Conquest II used to conduct cloud-seeding flights in the Australian state of Tasmania

In Australia, summer activities of CSIRO and Hydro Tasmania over central and western Tasmania between the 1960s and the present day appear to have been successful. Seeding over the Hydro-Electricity Commission catchment area on the Central Plateau achieved rainfall increases as high as 30% in autumn. The Tasmanian experiments were so successful that the Commission has regularly undertaken seeding ever since in mountainous parts of the State.

In 2004, Snowy Hydro Limited began a trial of cloud seeding to assess the feasibility of increasing snow precipitation in the Snowy Mountains in Australia. The test period, originally scheduled to end in 2009, was later extended to 2014. The New South Wales (NSW) Natural Resources Commission, responsible for supervising the cloud seeding operations, believes that the trial may have difficulty establishing statistically whether cloud seeding operations are increasing snowfall. This project was discussed at a summit in Narrabri, NSW on 1 December 2006. The summit met with the intention of outlining a proposal for a 5-year trial, focusing on Northern NSW.

The various implications of such a widespread trial were discussed, drawing on the combined knowledge of several worldwide experts, including representatives from the Tasmanian Hydro Cloud Seeding Project however does not make reference to former cloud seeding experiments by the then-Snowy Mountains Authority, which rejected weather modification. The trial required changes to NSW environmental legislation in order to facilitate placement of the cloud seeding apparatus. The modern experiment is not supported for the Australian Alps.

In December 2006, the Queensland government of Australia announced a A$7.6 million in funding for "warm cloud" seeding research to be conducted jointly by the Australian Bureau of Meteorology and the United States National Center for Atmospheric Research. Outcomes of the study are hoped to ease continuing drought conditions in the states South East region.

In March 2020, scientists from the Sydney Institute of Marine Science and Southern Cross University trialled marine cloud seeding off the coast of Queensland, Australia, with the aim to protect Great Barrier Reef from coral bleaching and dieoff during marine heatwaves. Using two high-pressure turbines, the team sprayed microscopic droplets of saltwater into the air. These then evaporate leaving behind very small salt crystals, which water vapour clings to, creating clouds that reflect the sun more effectively.

=== Africa ===
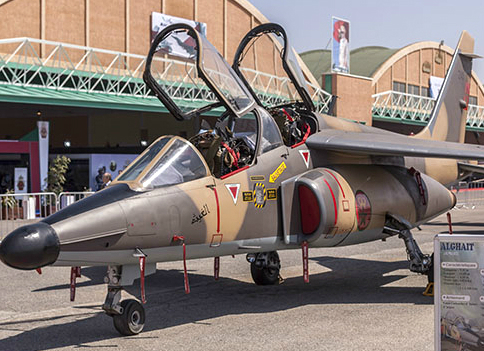
Alpha jet 2014 Morocco

In Mali and Niger, cloud seeding is also used on a national scale. It has also been used between 1999 and 2002 in Burkina Faso and from 2005 in Senegal. Cloud seeding experiments and operations were also conducted in Rhodesia (now Zimbabwe) between 1968 and 1980.

==== Morocco ====
In 1985 the Moroccan Government started with a Cloud seeding program called 'Al-Ghait'. Morocco utilizes an active weather modification initiative known as Programme Al Ghait, which artificially enhances rainfall through cloud seeding to combat severe, persistent droughts. Originally established in 1984 in collaboration with the United States, the Moroccan government has significantly ramped up funding and infrastructure for the program.

== Legal frameworks and implications ==
=== Existing international legislation ===
The Convention on the Prohibition of Military or Any Other Hostile Use of Environmental Modification Techniques (ENMOD) is the only international framework related to the regulation of weather and climate modification technologies. Developed after cloud-seeding operations were conducted during the Vietnam War and the Cold War, the convention's scope of application solely encompasses military or any other hostile uses of weather modification technologies. Indeed, the use of weather modification programs for peaceful purposes is not prohibited by the treaty. ENMOD has been criticised for its many weaknesses, notably regarding the vagueness and ambiguity of notions leaving room for various interpretations.

=== Ownership of clouds ===
Given the growing attractiveness of weather modification programs, the legal framework offered by ENMOD is arguably insufficient, as the question of "ownership" is not answered. A 1948 article in the Stanford Law Review stated that attributing a "legal title to a cloud would be ridiculous" due to the distinct nature of clouds, their perpetual change of form and location, their emergence, disappearance and renewal. Similarly, Brooks considers private ownership of clouds as "nonsense" as control is limited to the short moment of the cloud being above somebody's land. Quilleré-Majzoub (2004) dismisses the concept of ownership of clouds altogether, given their specific nature, rendering the idea of a cloud ever belonging to somebody unsubstantiated. Indeed, clouds are beyond occupancy – similar to air, running water, the sea and animals ferae naturae – and should thus be considered as common property. Based on this assumption, according to Quilleré-Majzoub it follows that a distinction between res communis, belonging to everybody and thus necessitating international regulation, and res nullius, belonging to nobody with states serving themselves as they please, is more suitable. Although water is generally considered as res nullius in international law, there is strong pressure to acknowledging it as res communis, but cloud moisture does currently not have a clearly defined status. She thus suggests that international law should elaborate a jurisdictional regime that takes into account both the particular nature of clouds and the implications of new technologies.

According to Brooks (1948) the picture changes once the moisture in the clouds is made accessible through artificial rainmaking technologies, as the rainwater can now be occupied. Typically, regarding naturally occurring precipitation, the first to reduce it to possession, normally the landowner, will gain rights in it as long as no existing rights are violated. Given that this benefit is accorded by nature, these natural rights should not allow the landowner to claim artificially induced rain. California legislation binds water generated through seeding to existing surface water rights and groundwater regulations, considering the produced water "natural supply". Yet courts could decide that the induced rain should be designated as "additional precipitation", permitting the cloud-seeding entity to claim a portion of this generated water. This approach would also face challenges, given the difficulty of determining the fraction of extra water procured by cloud seeding.

== Conspiracy theories ==
Cloud seeding has been the focus of many theories based on the belief that governments manipulate the weather in order to control various conditions, including global warming, populations, military weapons testing, public health, and flooding. This speculation has been fuelled in part by government interventions and programs like Operation Popeye.

A 2016 classified ad placed by Los Angeles County's Department of Public Works in the Pasadena Star News sparked claims that widespread weather modification was being confirmed. The department followed up with a clarification that it was only describing cloud seeding, used as an anti-drought measure intermittently for more than half a century in Los Angeles.

== See also ==
- Hail cannon
- 2015 Southeast Asian haze
- Anthropogenic cloud
- Atmospheric moisture extraction
- Bioprecipitation
- Cloudbuster – a pseudoscientific device claimed to create clouds and rain via energy manipulation
- Fog collection
- Marine cloud brightening
- The Avengers – A Surfeit of H_{2}O
