= Rhenish Tower, Lynmouth =

Tower in Lynmouth, Devon, England

Rhenish Tower
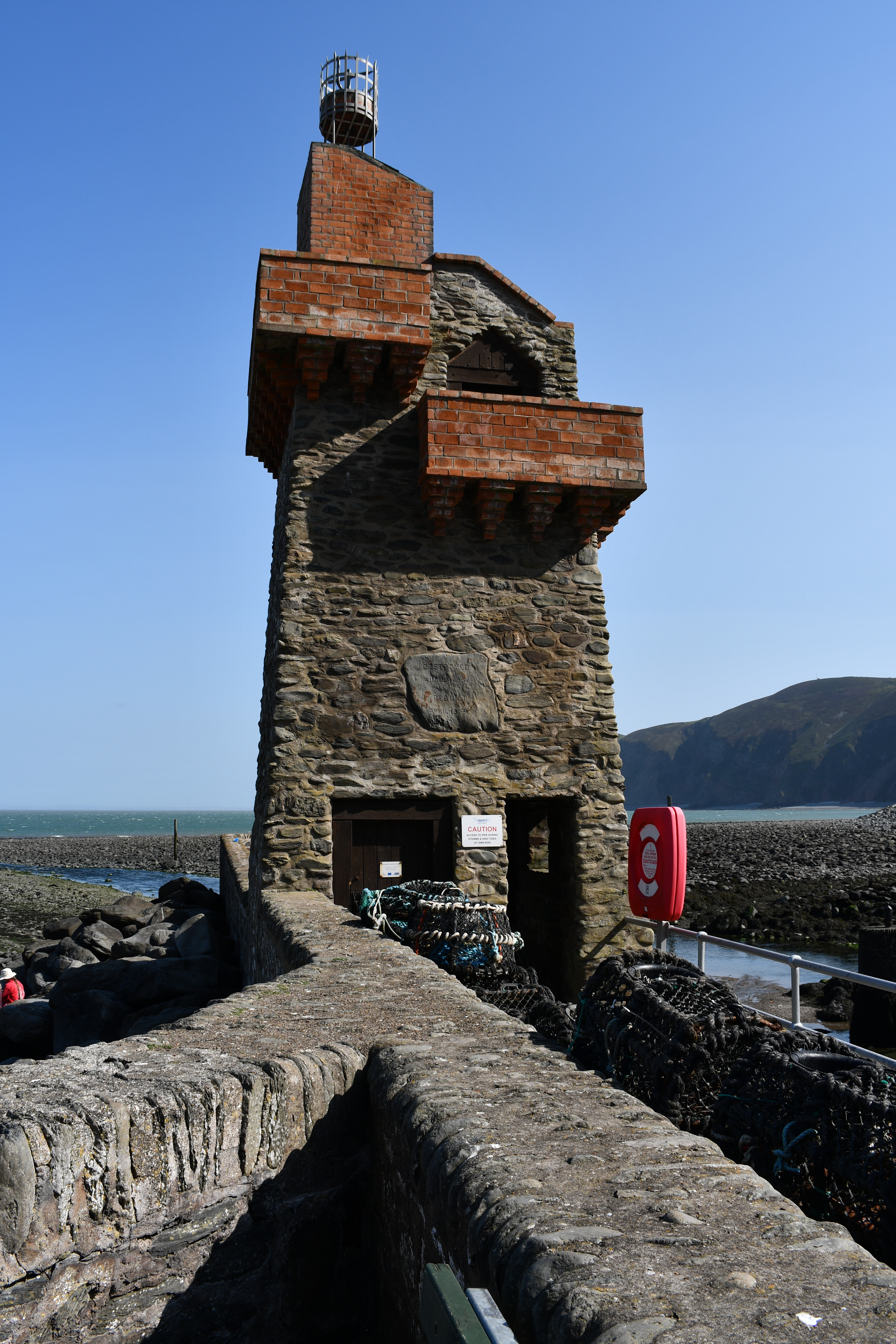
- Interactive map of Rhenish Tower
- 51°13′54.61″N 3°49′51.61″W
- Location: Lynmouth, Devon
- OS grid reference: SS 72258 49666

Listed Building – Grade II
- Designated: 19 July 1950
- Reference no.: 1210267

The Rhenish Tower is a building located on the pier of Lynmouth, in Devon, England, originally built in the 19th century. It is Grade II listed. The tower has been called "a Lynmouth icon".

== History and description ==
It is a square tower, built mostly of rubble. Near the top are two balconies supported by brick machicolations, and above this is a brick turret with a fire basket. The tower acquired its name because it was said to resemble a tower on the River Rhine.

It is thought to have been built in the early 19th century as a beacon to guide mariners. Because the tower was regarded as an eyesore, the balconies were added. An electric light was later fitted as a beacon.

There was an alternative original function: to provide salt water from a tank in the tower to baths in the Bath Hotel on Lynmouth Street (now Grade II listed). Bathing in salt water was believed to be good for health, and allowing participants to avoid cold water or heavy waves.

The tower was the subject of paintings by Arthur Lee (mid 19th-century) and Samuel Calvert. They are both in Lynton Town Hall.

The tower was destroyed by the Lynmouth Flood on 15 August 1952, and was rebuilt in 1954. The fire basket, salvaged from the beach, was the only retained part from the original tower.
