= Rhenish Palatinate =

Rhenish Palatinate (German: Rheinpfalz) may refer to:

- Rhenish Palatinate, a name for the Palatinate region (Pfalz), Rhineland-Palatinate, Germany
- The Electoral Palatinate, a state that existed until 1803
- Rhenish Palatinate, another name for the Circle of Rhine (Rheinkreis) or the Bavarian Palatinate (Bayerischen Pfalz) west of the Rhine, from 1835 until 1946

== See also ==
- Rheinpfalz (disambiguation)
- Rhine Palatinate (wine region), the former name of the Palatinate wine region, Germany
