= Philip Eden =

British weather journalist (1951–2018)

Geoffrey Philip Eden (14 July 1951 – 3 January 2018) was a British weather journalist and weather historian.

Philip Eden studied a BA in Geography before gaining a masters in applied meteorology and climatology at Birmingham University in 1972.

His career as a radio weather presenter began with the (then) London station LBC in 1983. He was subsequently chief network weather presenter for BBC Radio 5 Live from 1994 to 2005. He wrote a weekly column for the Sunday Telegraph from 1986 until forced to cease because of ill-health in 2015, and also had a daily "Weather Watch" column in the Daily Telegraph from 1998 to 2012. Eden wrote weekly features and monthly look-backs for WeatherOnline. He authored a number of books on British weather and climate.

Philip Eden was Vice President of the Royal Meteorological Society from 2007 to 2009. Eden was awarded the Royal Meteorological Society's Gordon Manley Weather Prize in 2000. The prize is awarded annually for any outstanding contribution to Weather through a paper or papers, or other outstanding service to Weather, in the preceding five years that has furthered the public understanding of meteorology and oceanography.

He was a member of Hampstead Scientific Society and Director of the Chilterns Observatory Trust from 2007.

In the last few years of his life he was suffering from Lewy body dementia.
