= 1979 Pacific typhoon season =

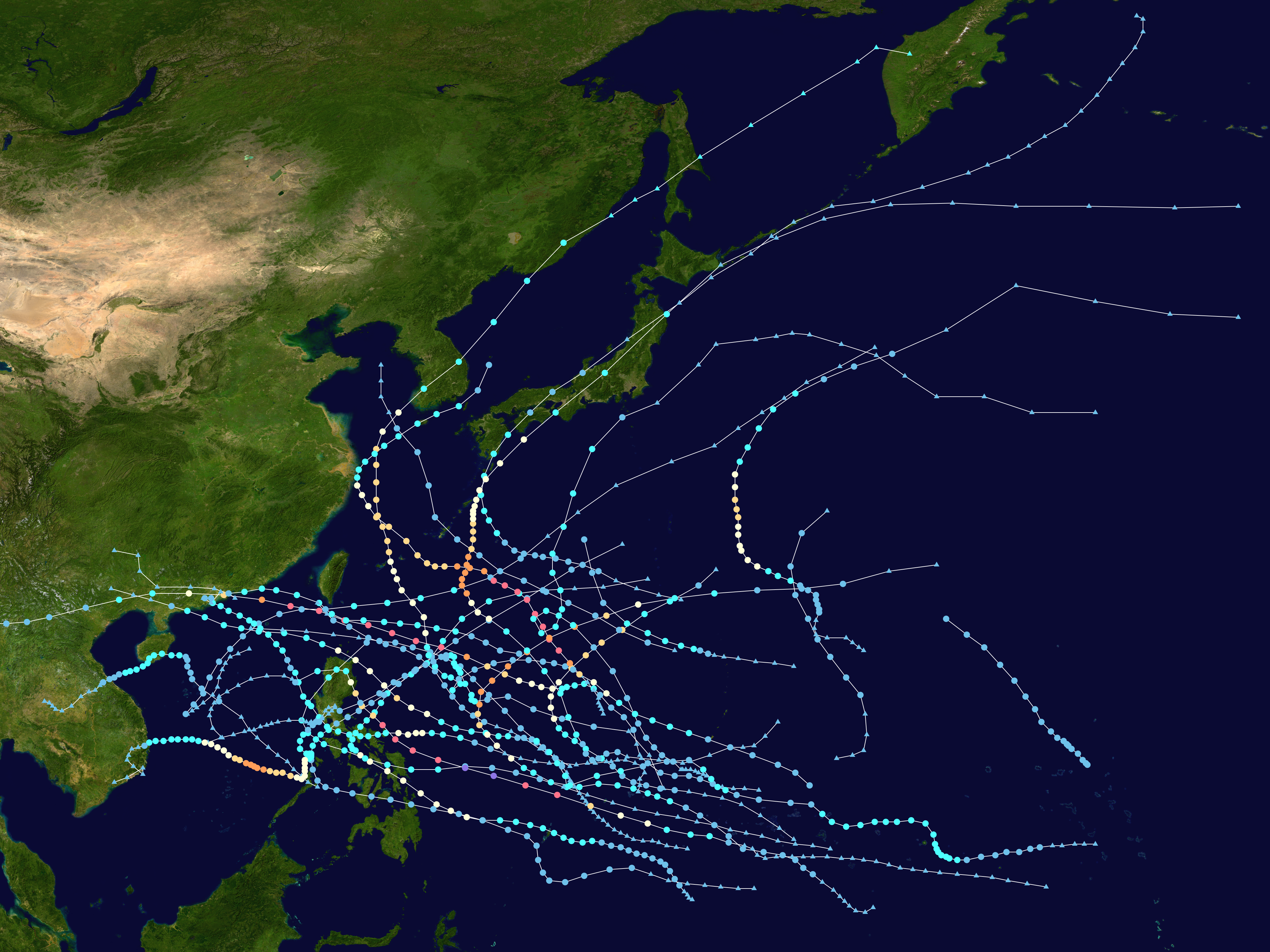
- Season summary map

Seasonal boundaries
- First system formed: December 31, 1978
- Last system dissipated: December 23, 1979

Strongest storm
- Name: Tip (Most intense tropical cyclone ever recorded by minimum central atmospheric pressure)
  - Maximum winds: 260 km/h (160 mph) (10-minute sustained)
  - Lowest pressure: 870 hPa (mbar)

Seasonal statistics
- Total depressions: 54
- Total storms: 24
- Typhoons: 12
- Very strong typhoons: 9
- Violent typhoons: 4
- Total fatalities: 541 total
- Total damage: $2.24 billion (1979 USD)

Related articles
- 1979 Atlantic hurricane season; 1979 Pacific hurricane season; 1979 North Indian Ocean cyclone season

The 1979 Pacific typhoon season was a slightly below-average season in terms of tropical cyclone activity, with only 24 named storms, 12 typhoons, and 4 super typhoons developing. However, it featured the largest and most intense tropical cyclone recorded globally, Typhoon Tip. The season also used both male and female names as tropical cyclone names for the first time. The season had no official bounds; it ran year-round in 1979, but most tropical cyclones tend to form in the northwestern Pacific Ocean between June and December. These dates conventionally delimit the period of each year when most tropical cyclones form in the northwestern Pacific Ocean.

The scope of this article is limited to the Pacific Ocean, north of the equator and west of the International Date Line. Storms that form east of the date line and north of the equator are called hurricanes; see 1979 Pacific hurricane season. Tropical storms formed in the entire west Pacific basin were assigned a name by the Joint Typhoon Warning Center. Tropical depressions in this basin have the "W" suffix added to their number. Tropical depressions that enter or form in the Philippine area of responsibility are assigned a name by the Philippine Atmospheric, Geophysical and Astronomical Services Administration or PAGASA. This can often result in the same storm having two names.

== Seasonal summary ==
54 tropical depressions formed this year in the Western Pacific, of which 24 became tropical storms. 13 storms reached typhoon intensity, of which 4 reached super typhoon strength.

== Systems ==
=== Typhoon Alice ===
- Very strong typhoon (JMA)
- Category 3 typhoon (SSHWS)
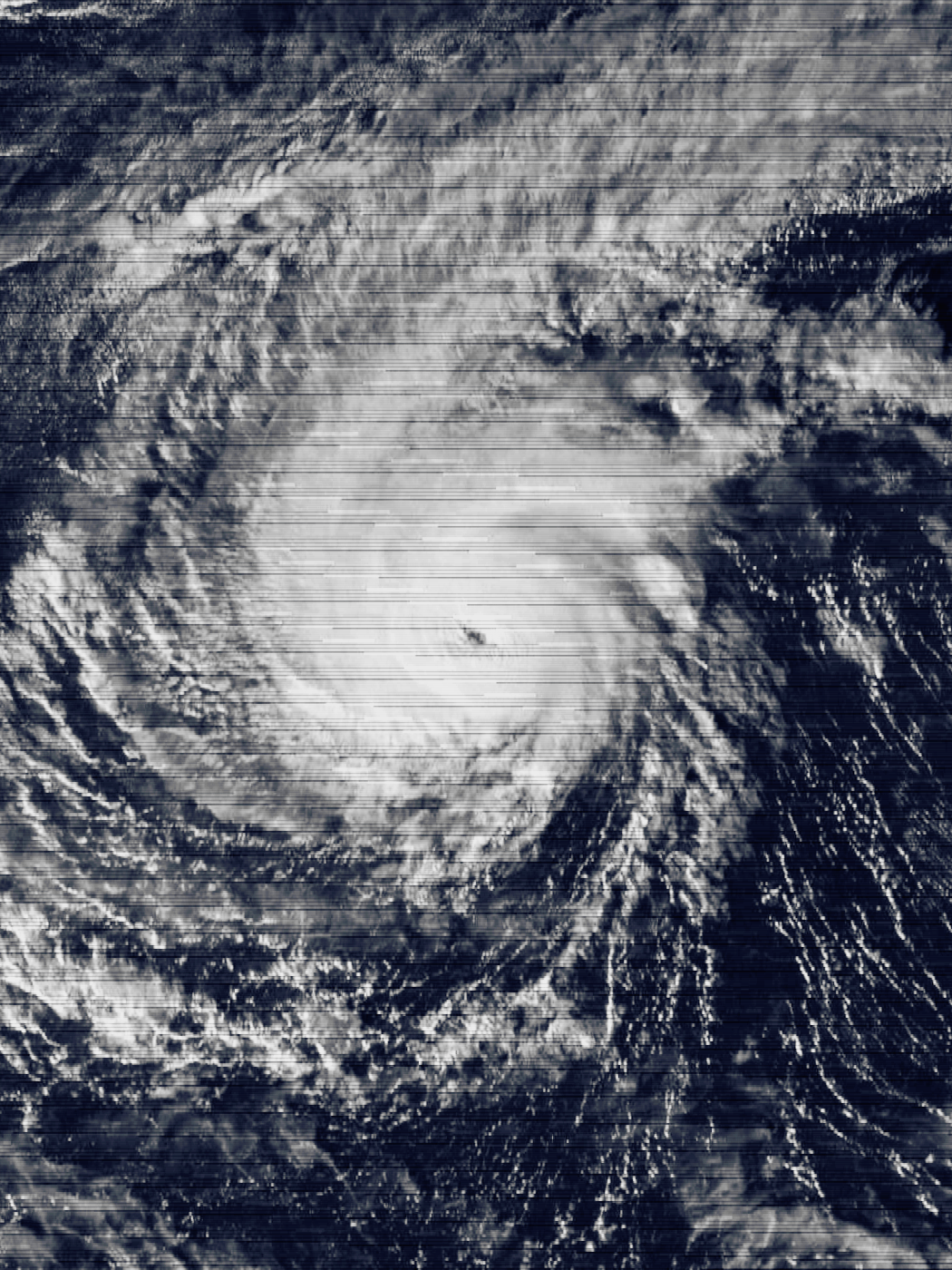
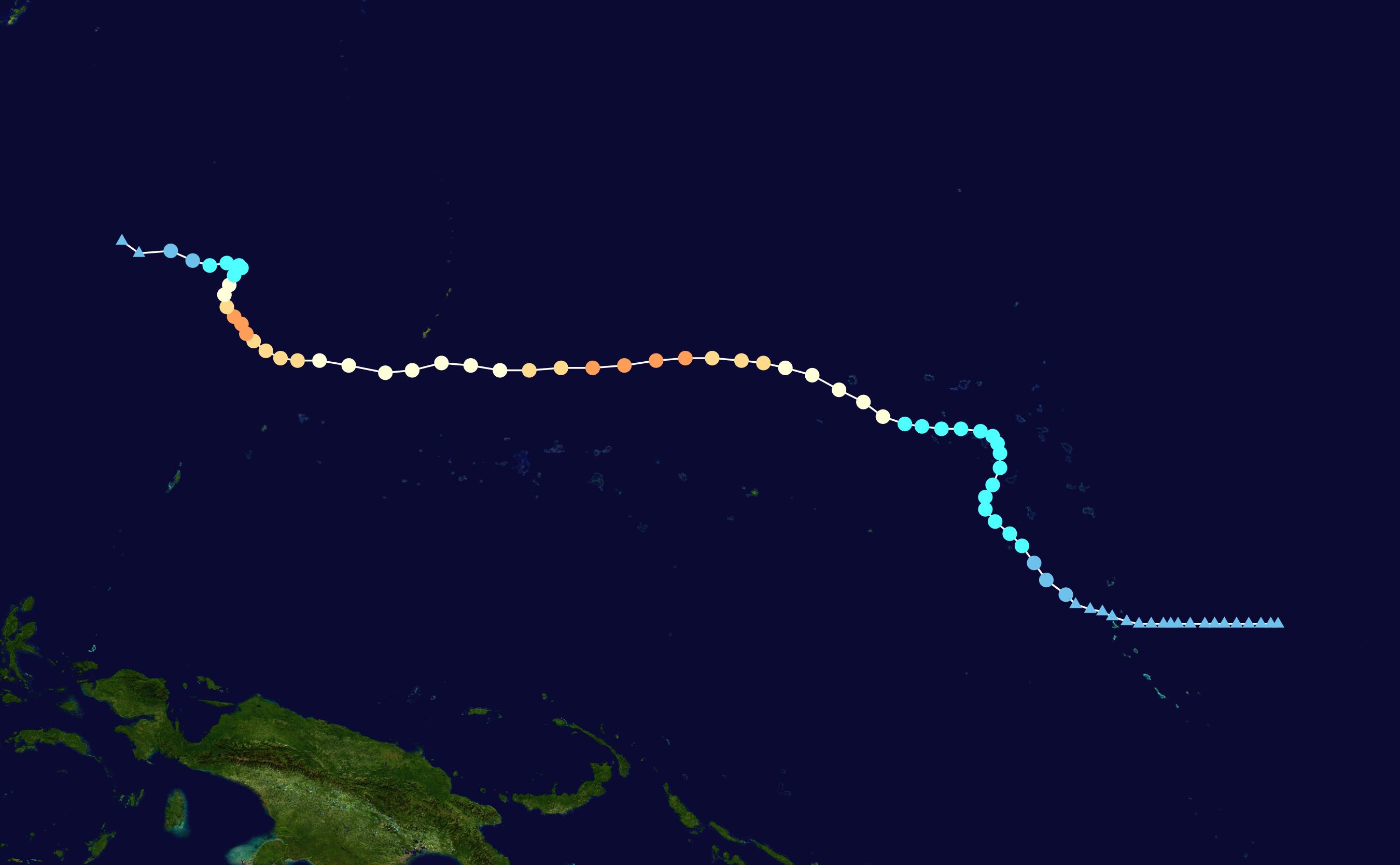
- Duration: December 31, 1978 – January 15, 1979
- Peak intensity: 175 km/h (110 mph) (10-min); 930 hPa (mbar)

On December 31, 1978, a tropical depression developed over the low latitudes of the open West Pacific. It tracked northwestward, reaching tropical storm strength that night and typhoon strength on January 5, 1979. Alice turned to the west, and continued to intensify with generally favorable conditions to a peak of 125 mph (200 km/h) winds on January 8. Cooler, drier air to the north caused Alice to weaken to a minimal typhoon, but as it turned northwestward, it briefly re-strengthened on January 11 with sustained winds of 115 mph (185 km/h). Upper-level winds, combined with the dry air significantly weakened Alice, and after stalling for three days, it finally dissipated on January 14. Alice caused extensive damage in the Marshall Islands.

=== Typhoon Bess (Auring) ===
- Typhoon (JMA)
- Category 2 typhoon (SSHWS)
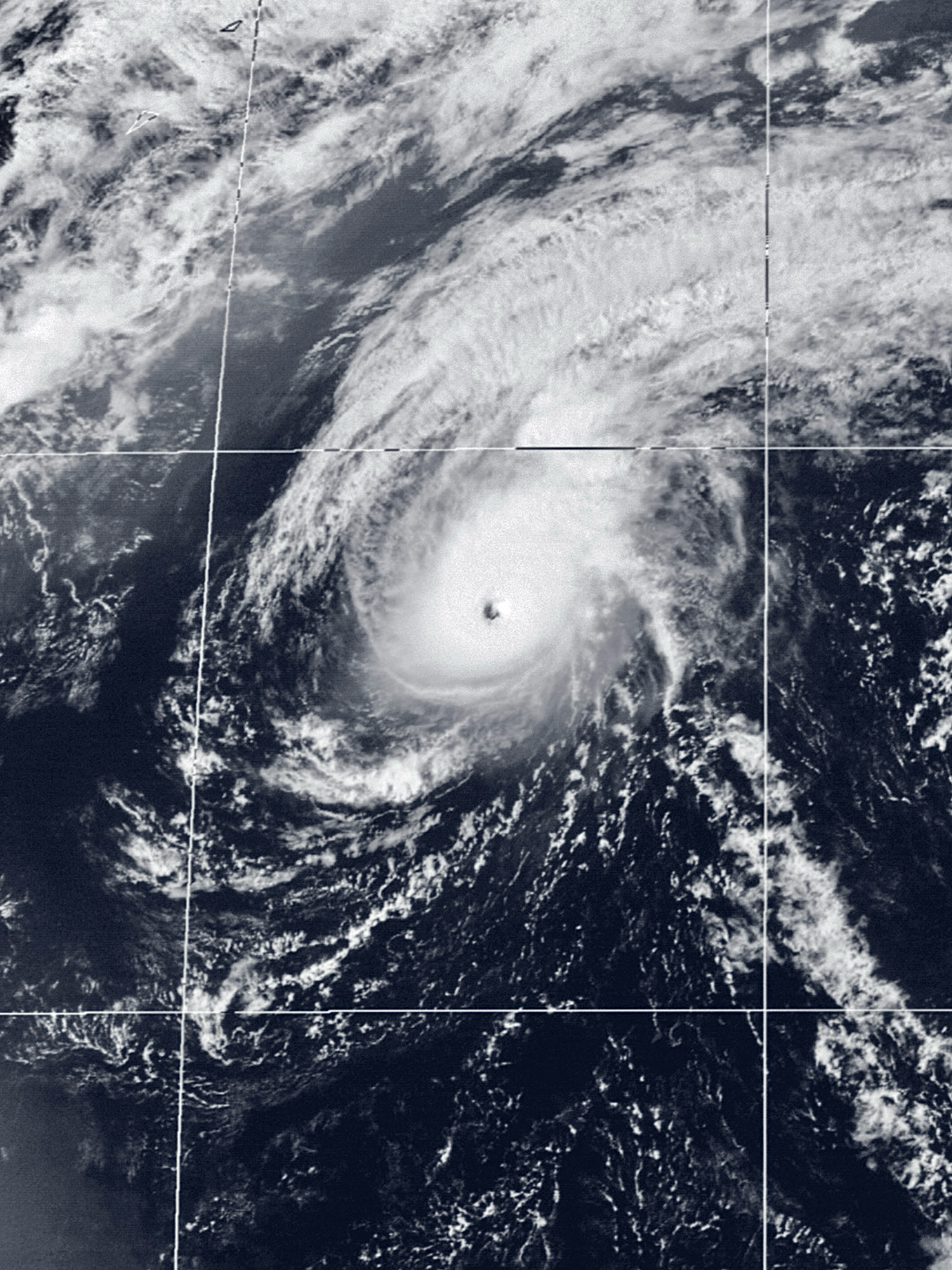
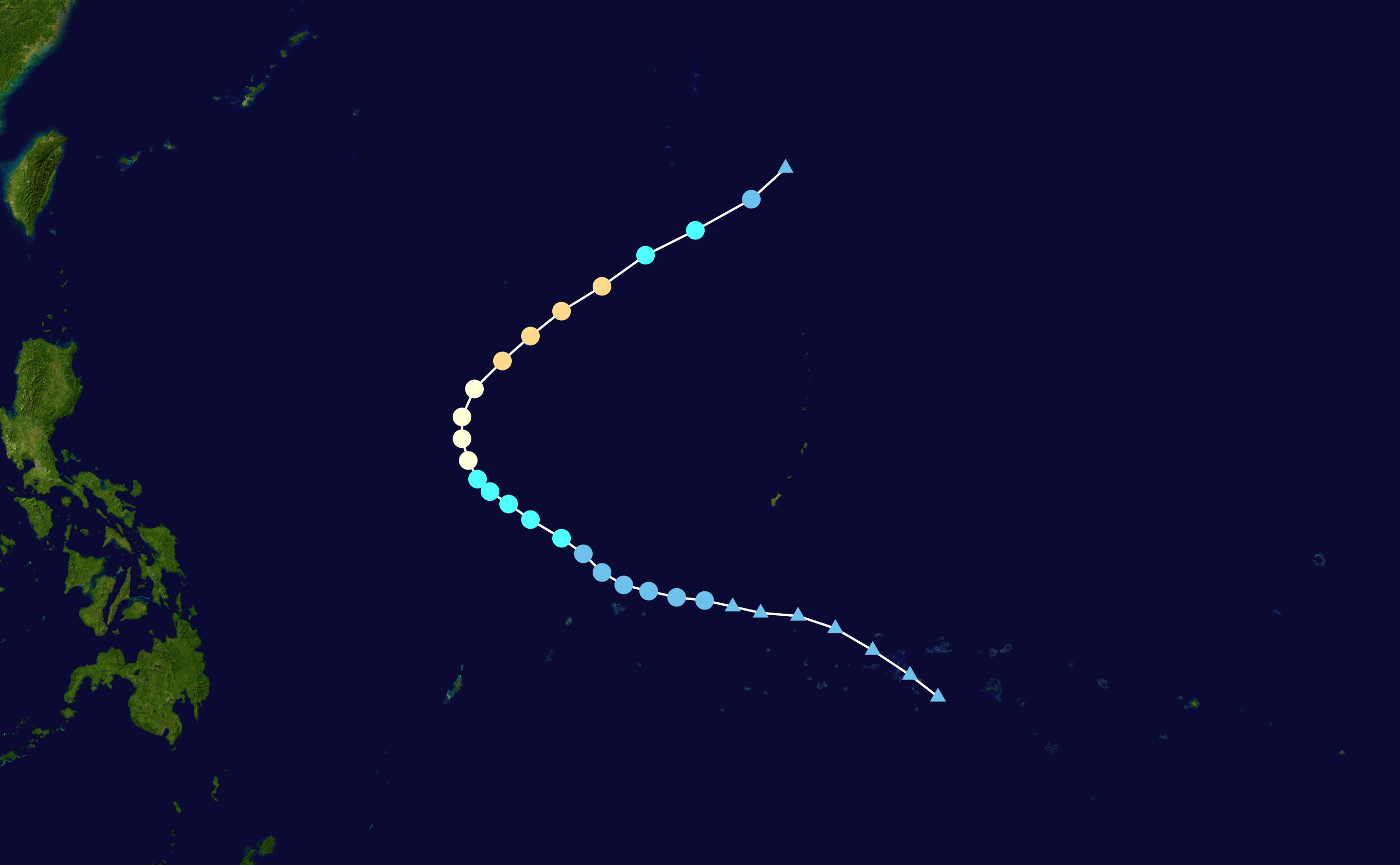
- Duration: March 19 – March 25
- Peak intensity: 130 km/h (80 mph) (10-min); 955 hPa (mbar)

Typhoon Bess was the third typhoon since 1959 to develop in the month of March. Bess began as a weak surface circulation on March 16. The circulation intensified into a tropical depression on March 19. Bess then reached tropical storm strength on March 21. Slow intensification occurred for 18 hours, before Bess reached its peak intensity of 105 mph (169 km/h) early on March 23. Bess held on to its peak intensity for 18 hours before vertical wind shear caused Bess to rapidly dissipate on March 25. Typhoon Bess remained away from land, and therefore caused no deaths or damage.

=== Typhoon Cecil (Bebeng) ===
- Typhoon (JMA)
- Category 1 typhoon (SSHWS)
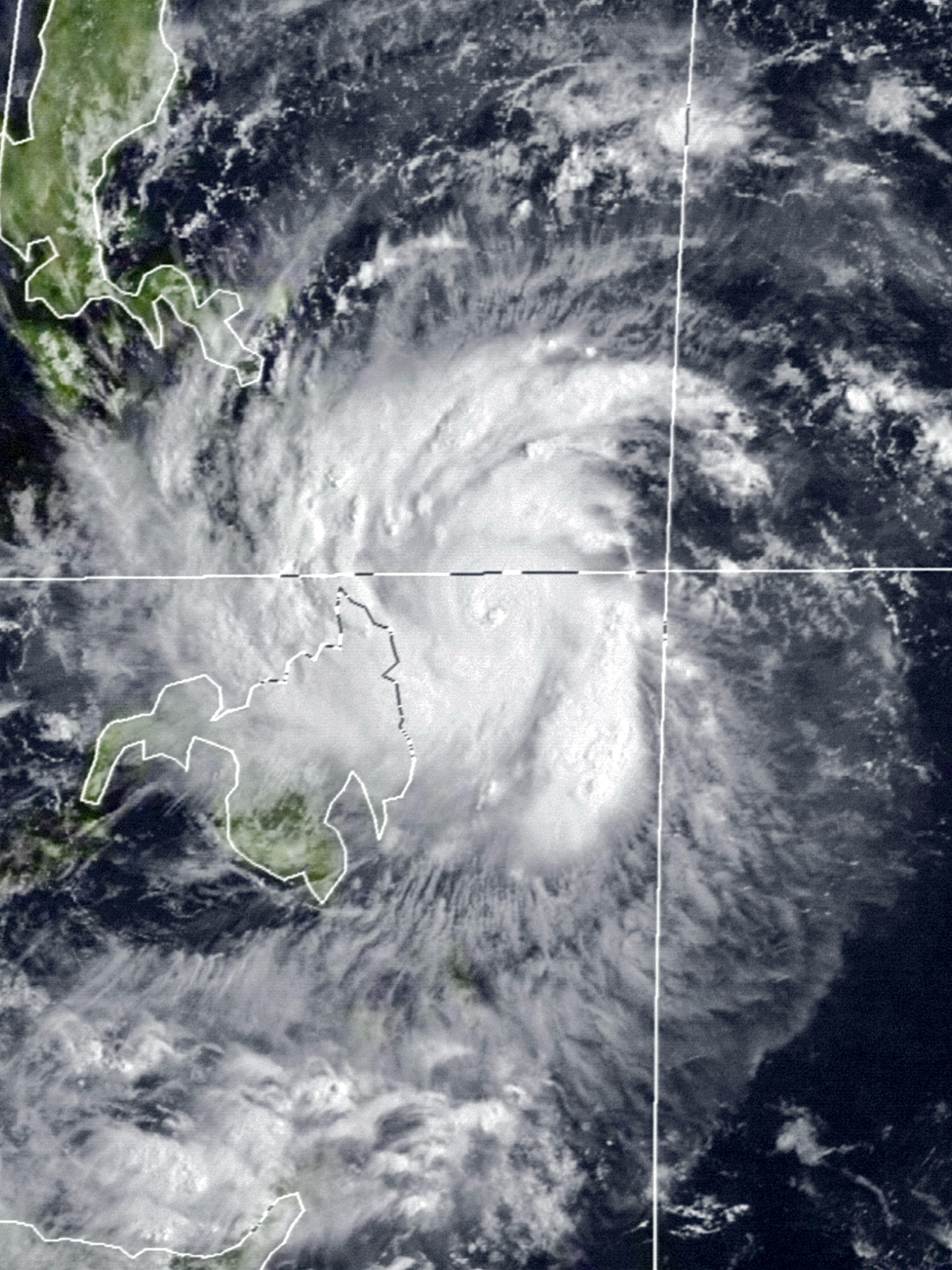
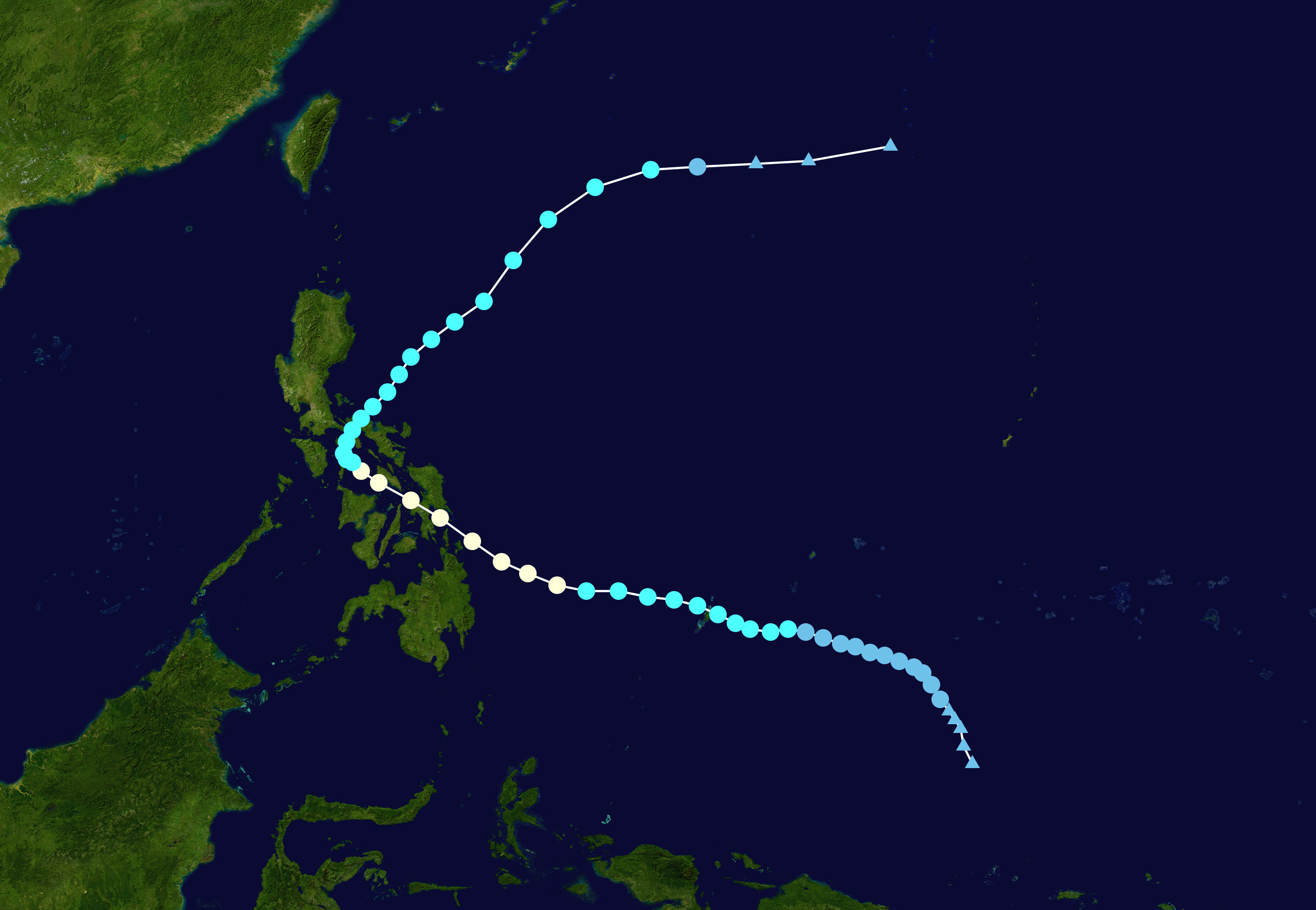
- Duration: April 10 – April 20
- Peak intensity: 140 km/h (85 mph) (10-min); 965 hPa (mbar)

Typhoon Cecil formed on the 10th from an easterly wave in early April. The storm then reached its maximum intensity as a category 1 typhoon on the 14th. Typhoon Cecil then dissipated on April 20. Cecil was also the first tropical cyclone in the Western Pacific to be given a male name. Typhoon Cecil stuck Leyte on April 15, damaging 57,087 homes, and leaving 8,900 homeless. Cecil caused ₱267 million (US$36.2 million) in damage and 30 deaths. 73 people were injured and 63 people were left missing.

=== Tropical Storm Dot (Karing) ===
- Tropical storm (JMA)
- Tropical storm (SSHWS)
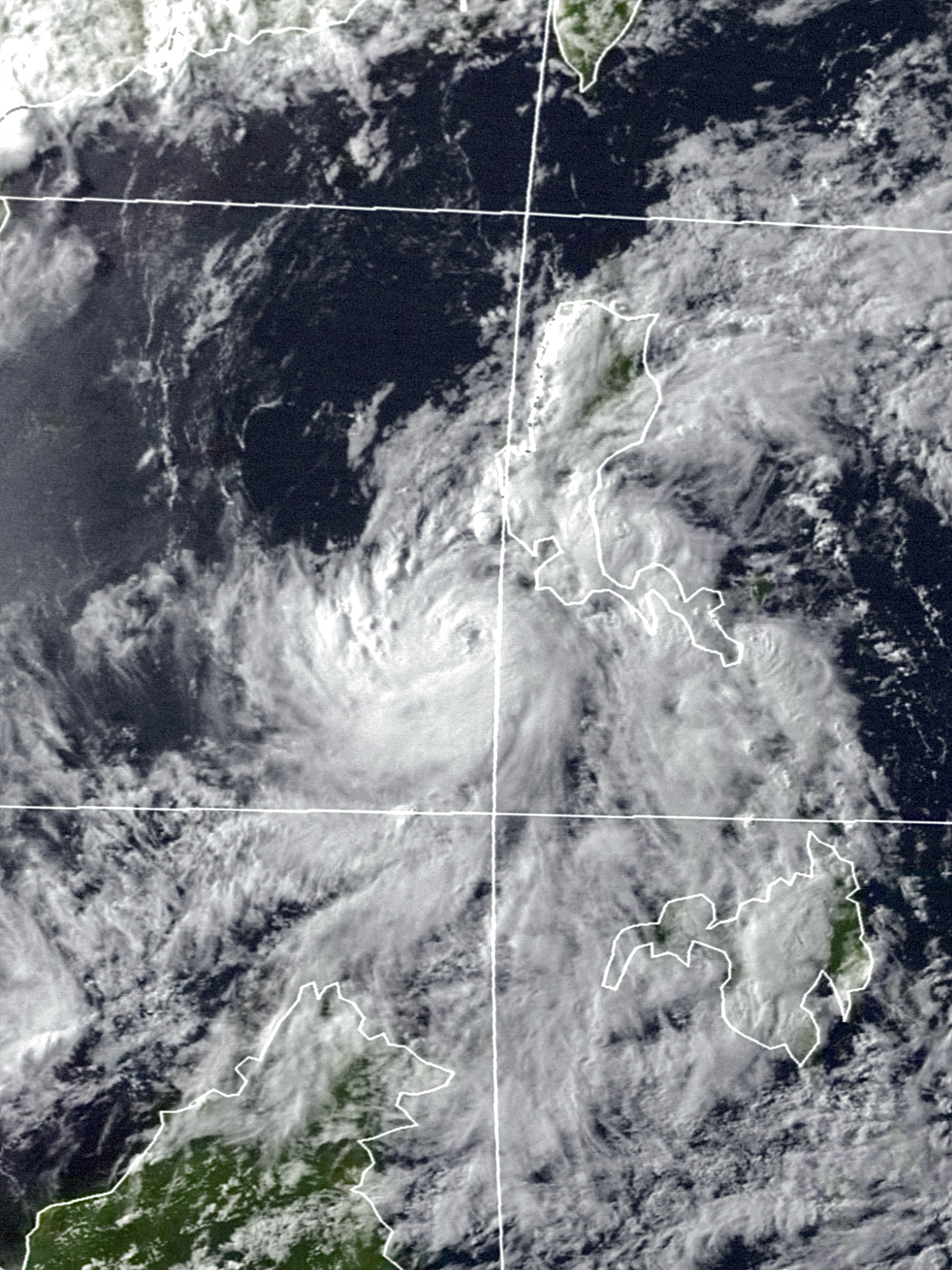
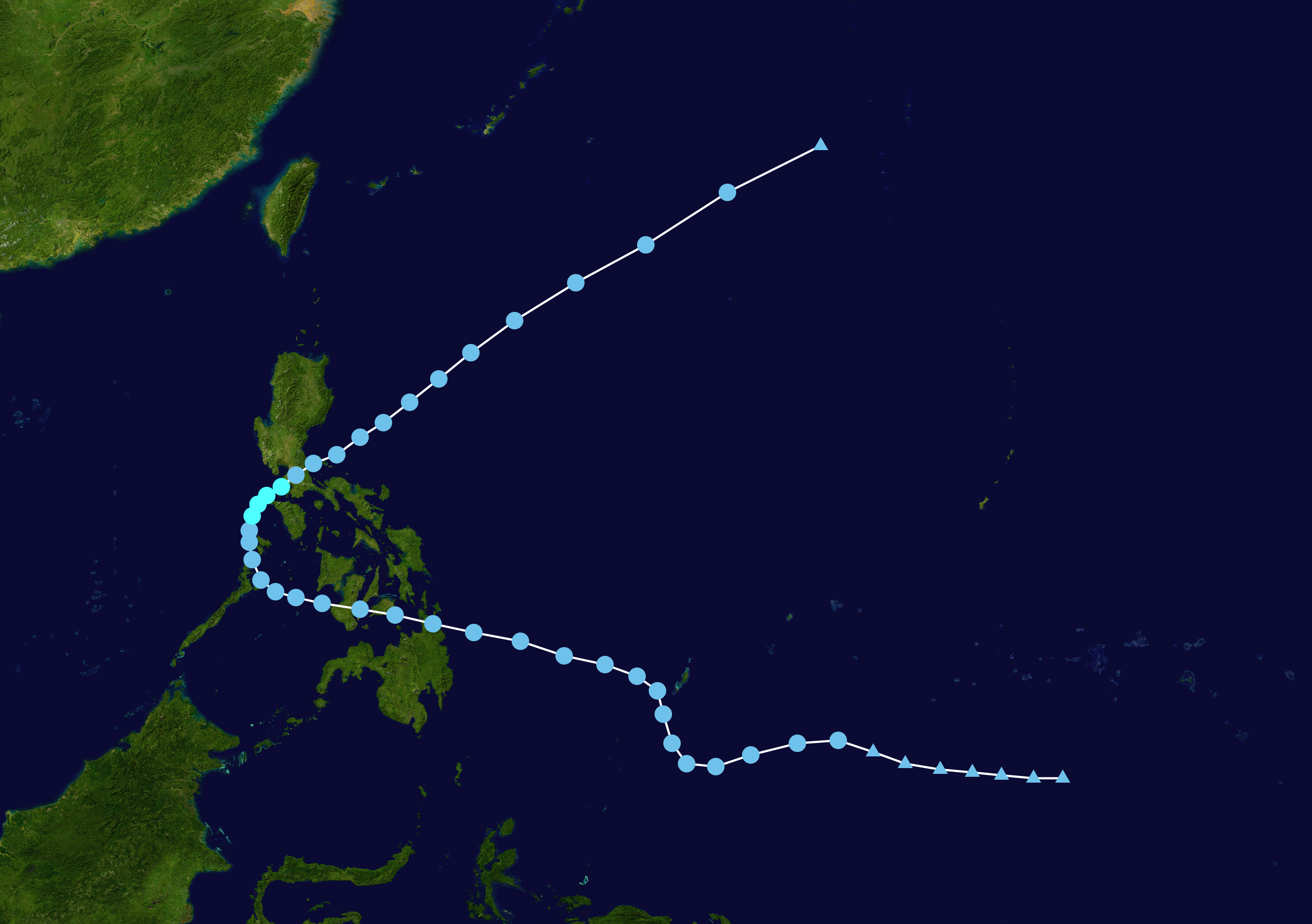
- Duration: May 9 – May 17
- Peak intensity: 75 km/h (45 mph) (10-min); 985 hPa (mbar)

A tropical disturbance developed on May 6. By May 10, the disturbance was upgraded to a tropical depression. It then was upgraded to a tropical storm on May 11. Dot then reached its peak intensity as a weak tropical storm the next day. Dot was downgraded to a tropical depression late on the 14th. The storm dissipated on May 17.

=== Tropical Depression 05W (Diding) ===
- Tropical storm (JMA)
- Tropical depression (SSHWS)
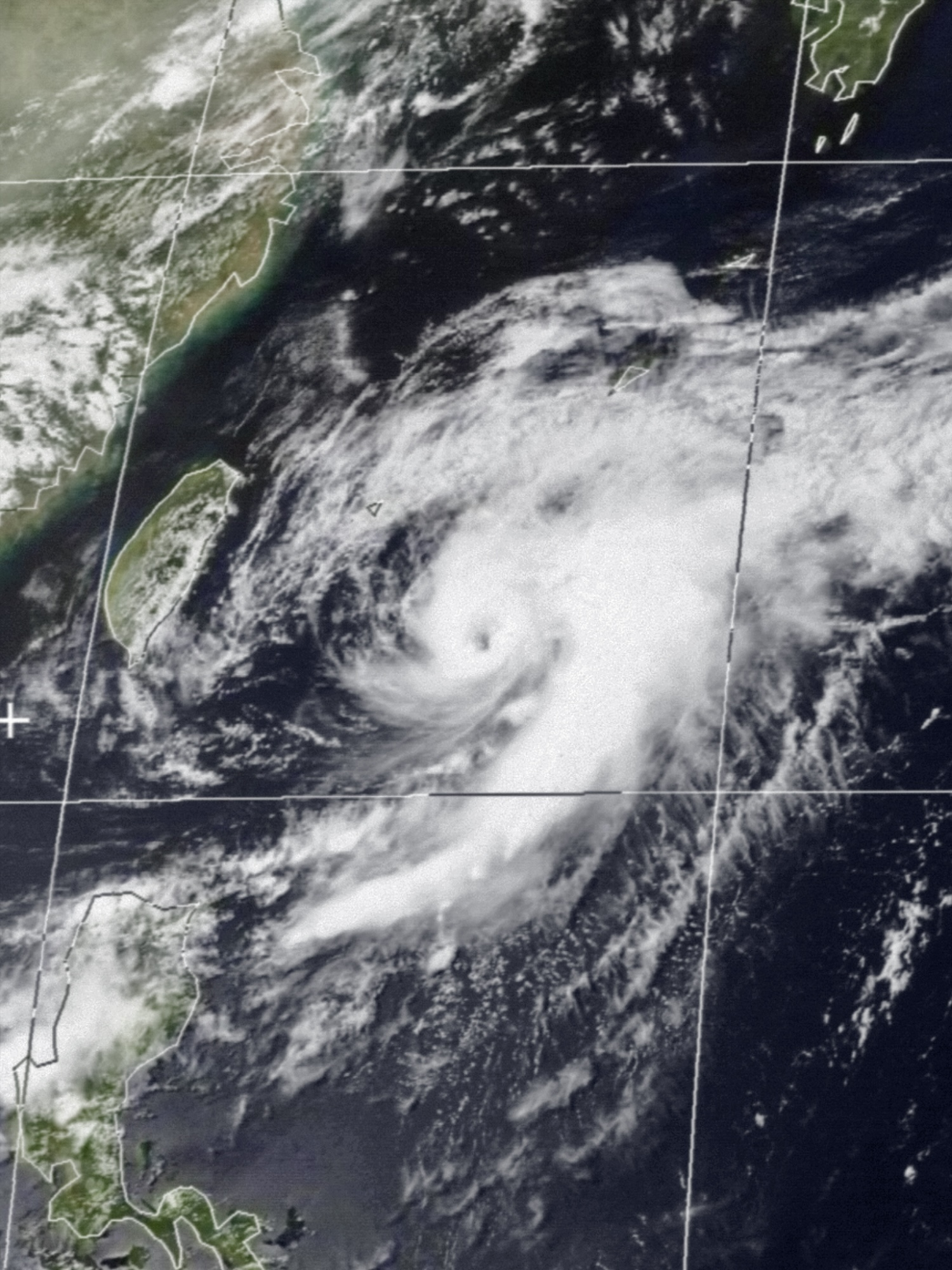
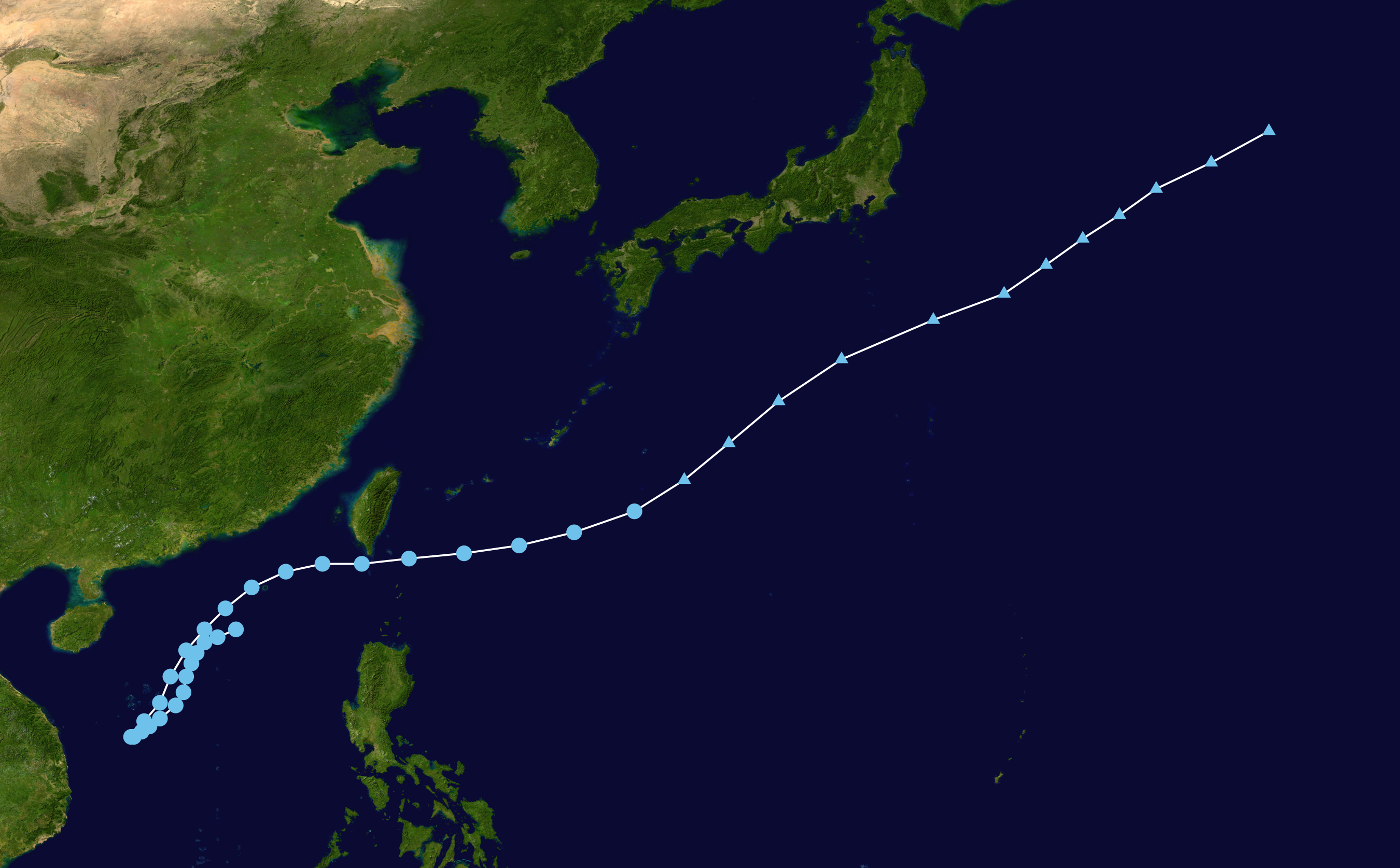
- Duration: May 17 – May 24
- Peak intensity: 75 km/h (45 mph) (10-min); 992 hPa (mbar)

Initially, TD 05 drifted southwestward east of the Paracel Islands. TD 05 was not forecast to intensify significantly, but it merged with an extratropical frontal boundary near 22.N 124.8E and produced an improved satellite signature which included a banding-type eye.

=== Typhoon Ellis (Etang) ===
- Typhoon (JMA)
- Category 2 typhoon (SSHWS)
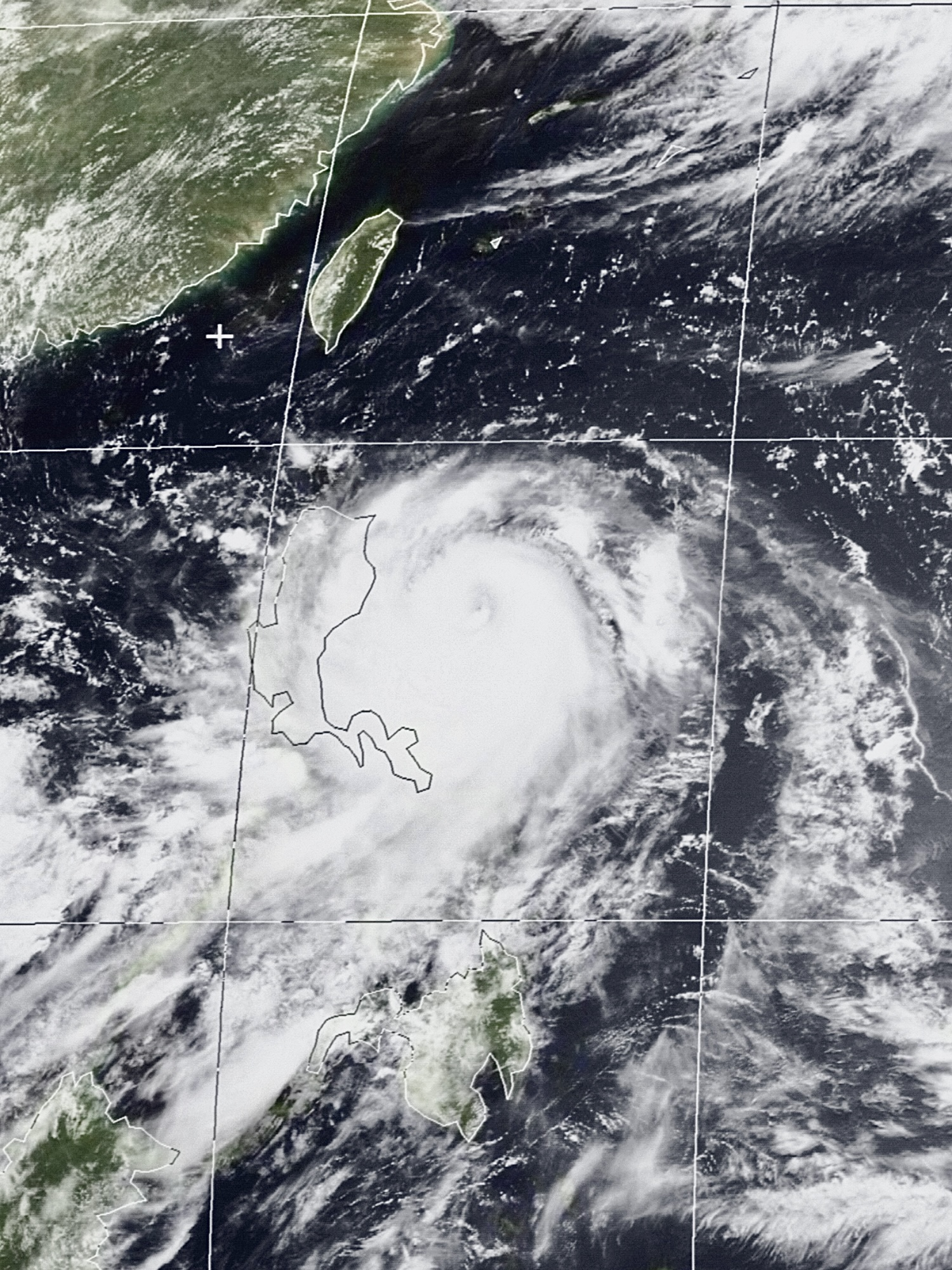
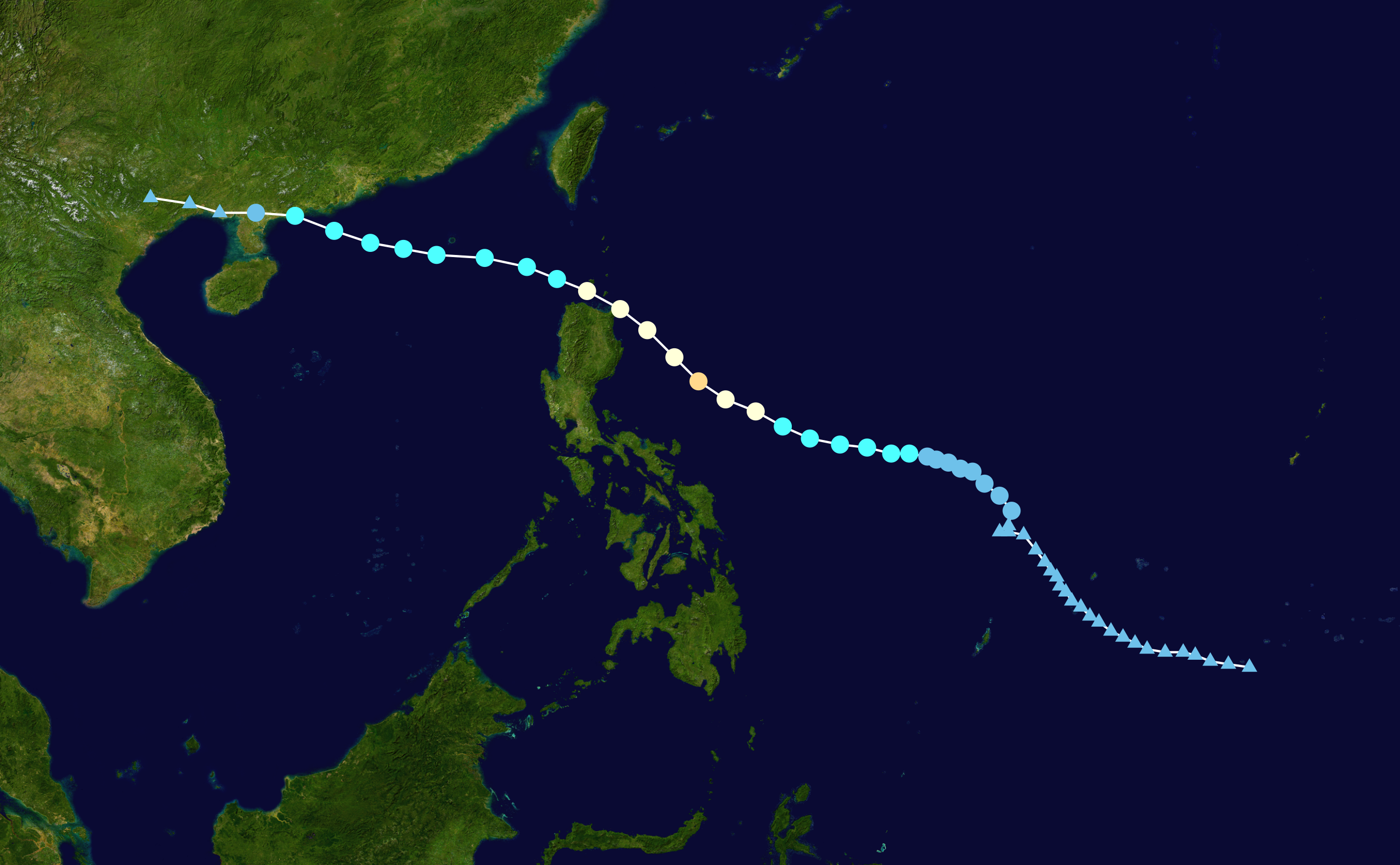
- Duration: June 29 – July 7
- Peak intensity: 140 km/h (85 mph) (10-min); 955 hPa (mbar)

A tropical disturbance was first noted on satellite and synoptic data on June 25. The disturbance was upgraded to a tropical depression about 670 nautical miles east of Manila on July 1. It rapidly intensified into a tropical storm and moved west-northwest. Ellis was in a favorable position at that time and steady intensification occurred over the next 2 days. Ellis intensified into a typhoon on July 2 and reached its peak intensity of 100 mph on later that day. Continued intensification was anticipated at that time, but a slow weakening trend was actually observed. The storm passed close to the northern tip of Luzon on July 4 and caused damage to tobacco-rich regions of the Philippines. Ellis then entered the South China Sea and weakened to a severe tropical storm while still moving west-northwest. Ellis made landfall on the Chinese coast on July 6 about 164 nautical miles southwest of Hong Kong and dissipated rapidly over land thereafter. Damage caused by Ellis in Hong Kong was minimal. Ellis caused ₱100,000 (US$14,000) of damage.

=== Severe Tropical Storm Faye (Gening) ===
- Severe tropical storm (JMA)
- Tropical storm (SSHWS)
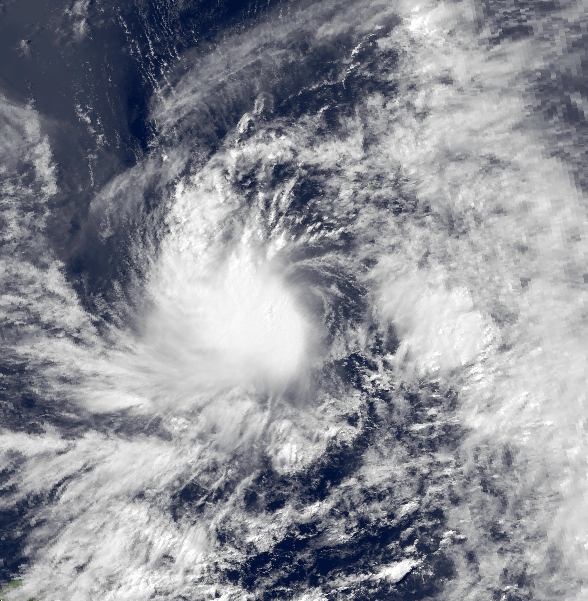
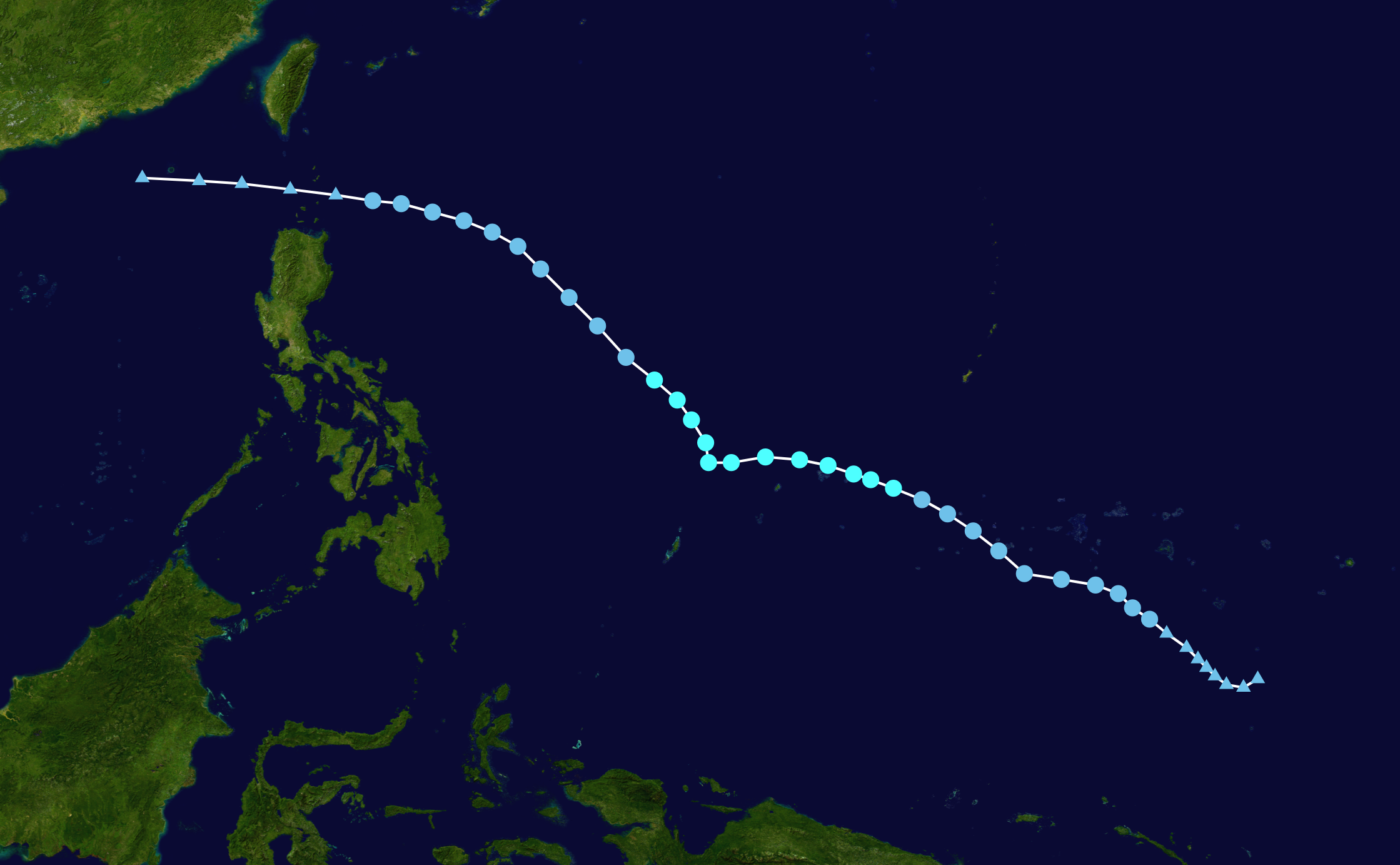
- Duration: July 1 – July 9
- Peak intensity: 100 km/h (65 mph) (10-min); 990 hPa (mbar)

A closed surface circulation was detected on June 28 about 920 mi (1,480 km) southeast of Guam. The associated convective activity remained disorganized until July 1. A few hours later, the disturbance intensified into a tropical depression. On July 3, it was upgraded to a tropical storm and was named Faye. Faye was forecast to reach typhoon status in the next 18 hours. However, Faye weakened. Faye was then downgraded to a tropical depression on July 4. Faye then dissipated on July 7 at 17N, 129.60E.

=== Tropical Depression 08W ===
- Tropical depression (SSHWS)
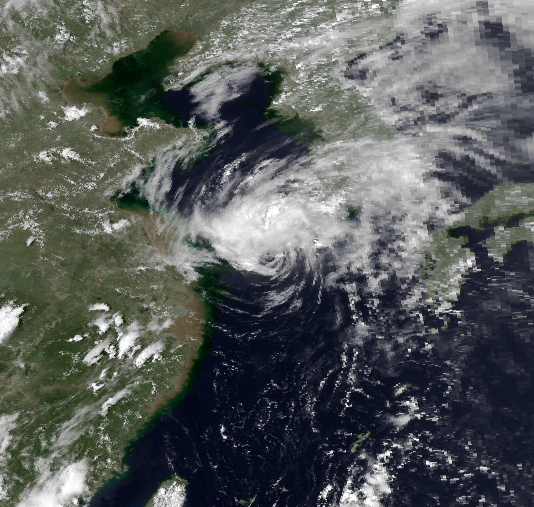
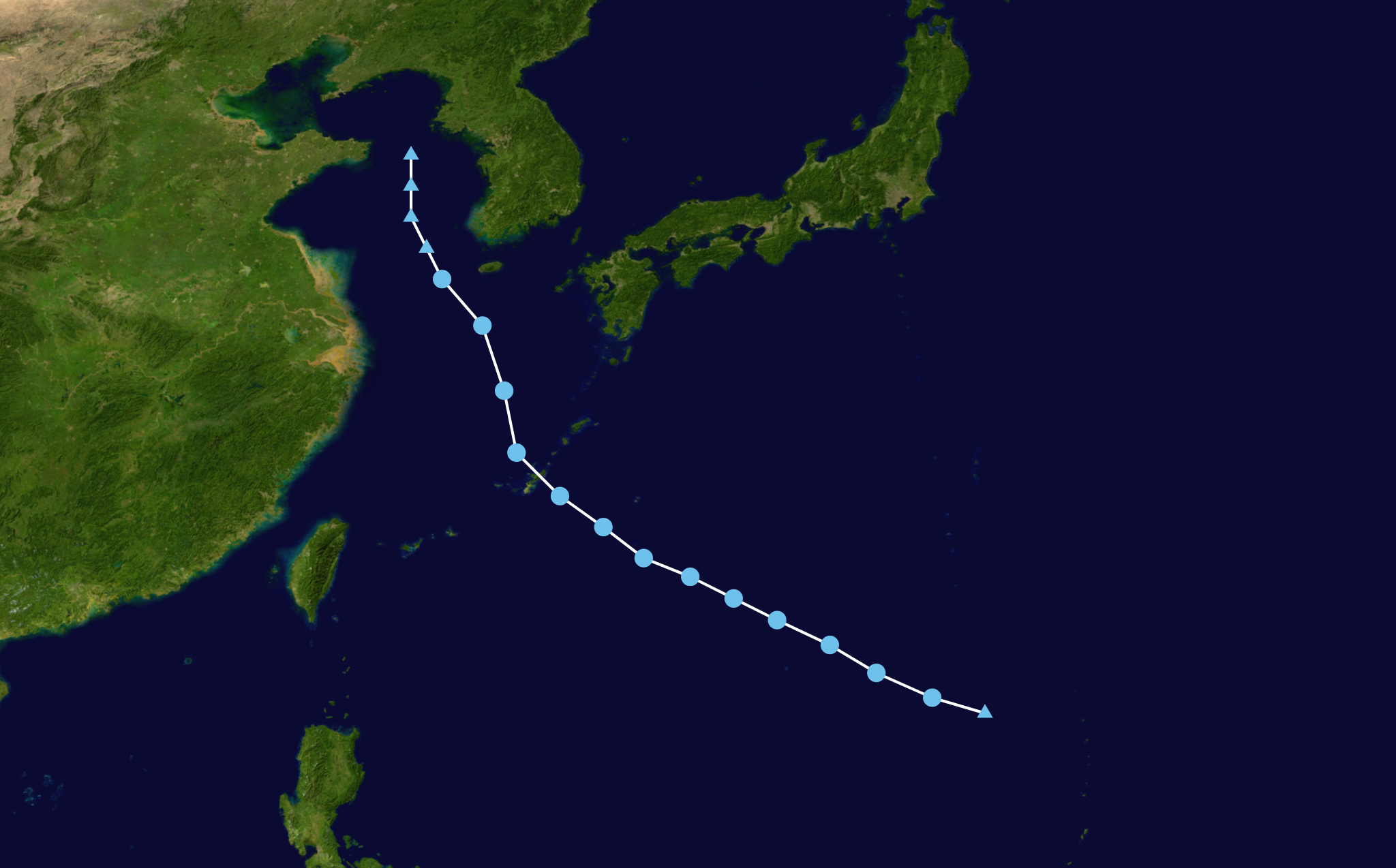
- Duration: July 23 – July 27
- Peak intensity: 35 km/h (25 mph) (1-min); 1005 hPa (mbar)

A storm that tracked into open waters.

=== Typhoon Hope (Ising) ===
- Violent typhoon (JMA)
- Category 4 super typhoon (SSHWS)
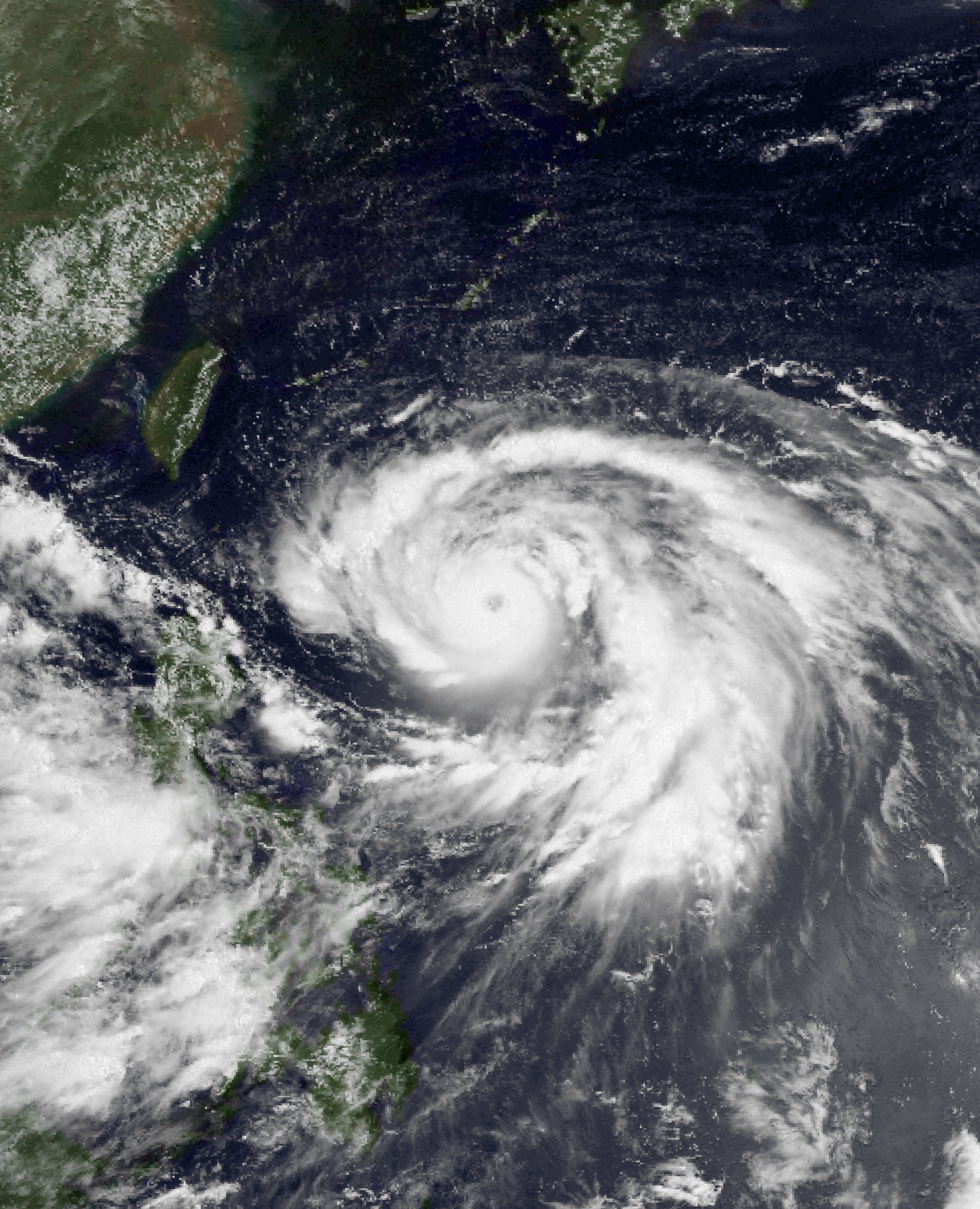
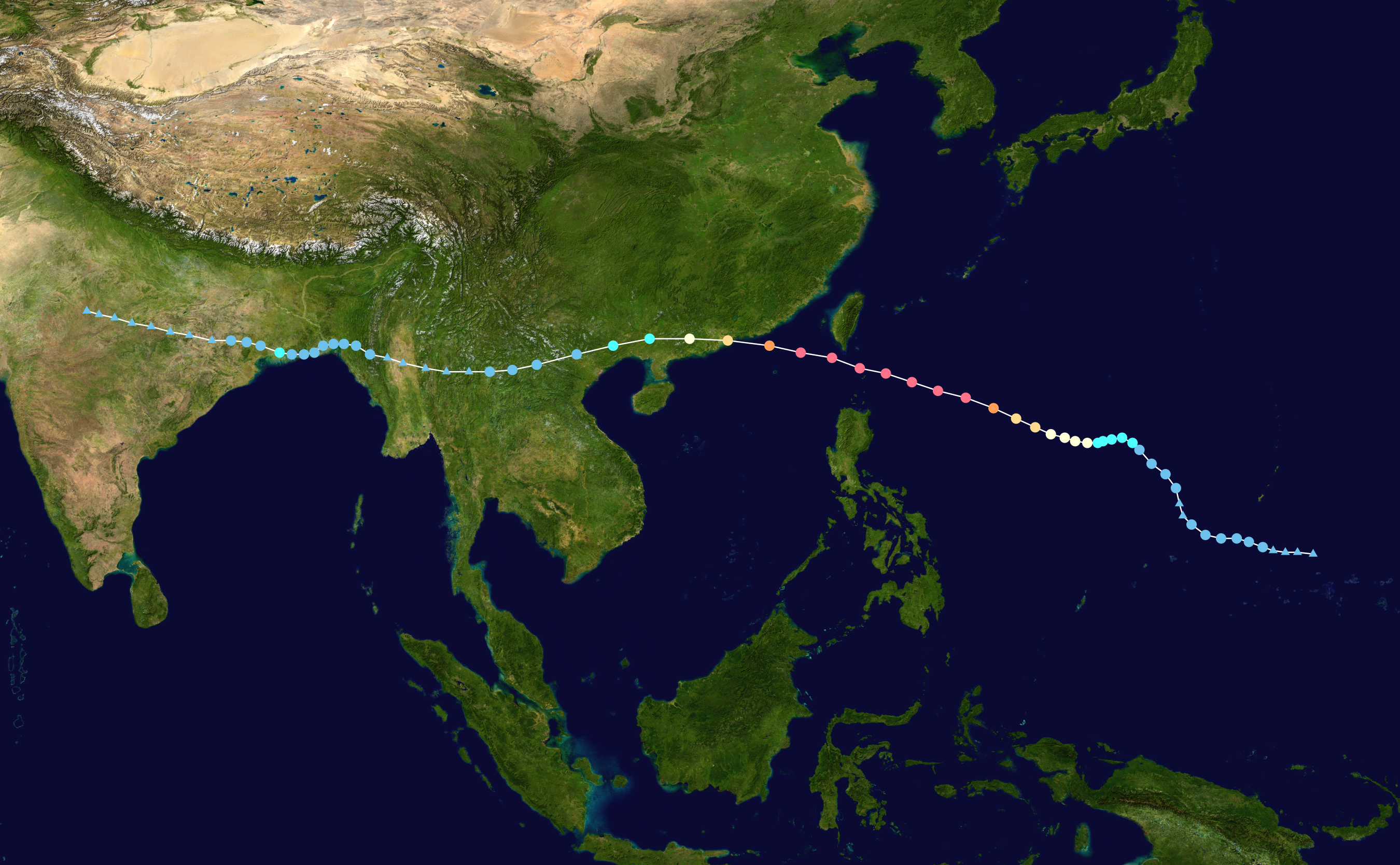
- Duration: July 24 – August 3
- Peak intensity: 205 km/h (125 mph) (10-min); 900 hPa (mbar)

A tropical depression formed southeast of Guam on July 24. It headed to the west-northwest, but upper-level shear from the TUTT caused the depression to dissipate on the 27th. It turned northward then westward, where it regenerated on the 28th. Intensification became more steady, with the depression reaching storm strength on the 28th and typhoon strength on the 29th. On the 31st, Hope reached a peak of 150 mph, but land interaction with Taiwan to the north weakened the storm. On August 2, Typhoon Hope struck southern China, about 10 miles east of Hong Kong. It weakened over the country while moving westward, but retained its satellite signature until August 3. In Guangdong Province in China, the typhoon was responsible for around 100 deaths or missing people. Twelve people died along with 260 injured in Hong Kong. Hope was the strongest tropical cyclone to hit Hong Kong since Typhoon Rose in 1971. Hope caused ₱4 million (US$542,000) throughout the Philippines.

=== Severe Tropical Storm Gordon (Herming) ===
- Severe tropical storm (JMA)
- Tropical storm (SSHWS)
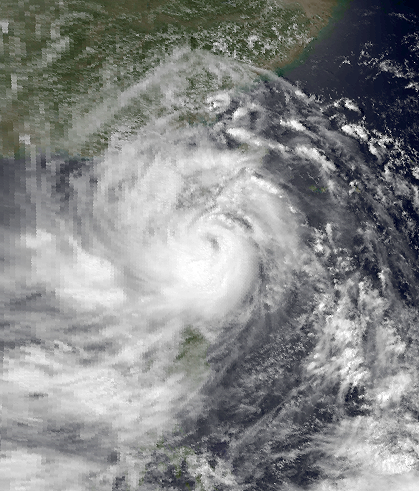
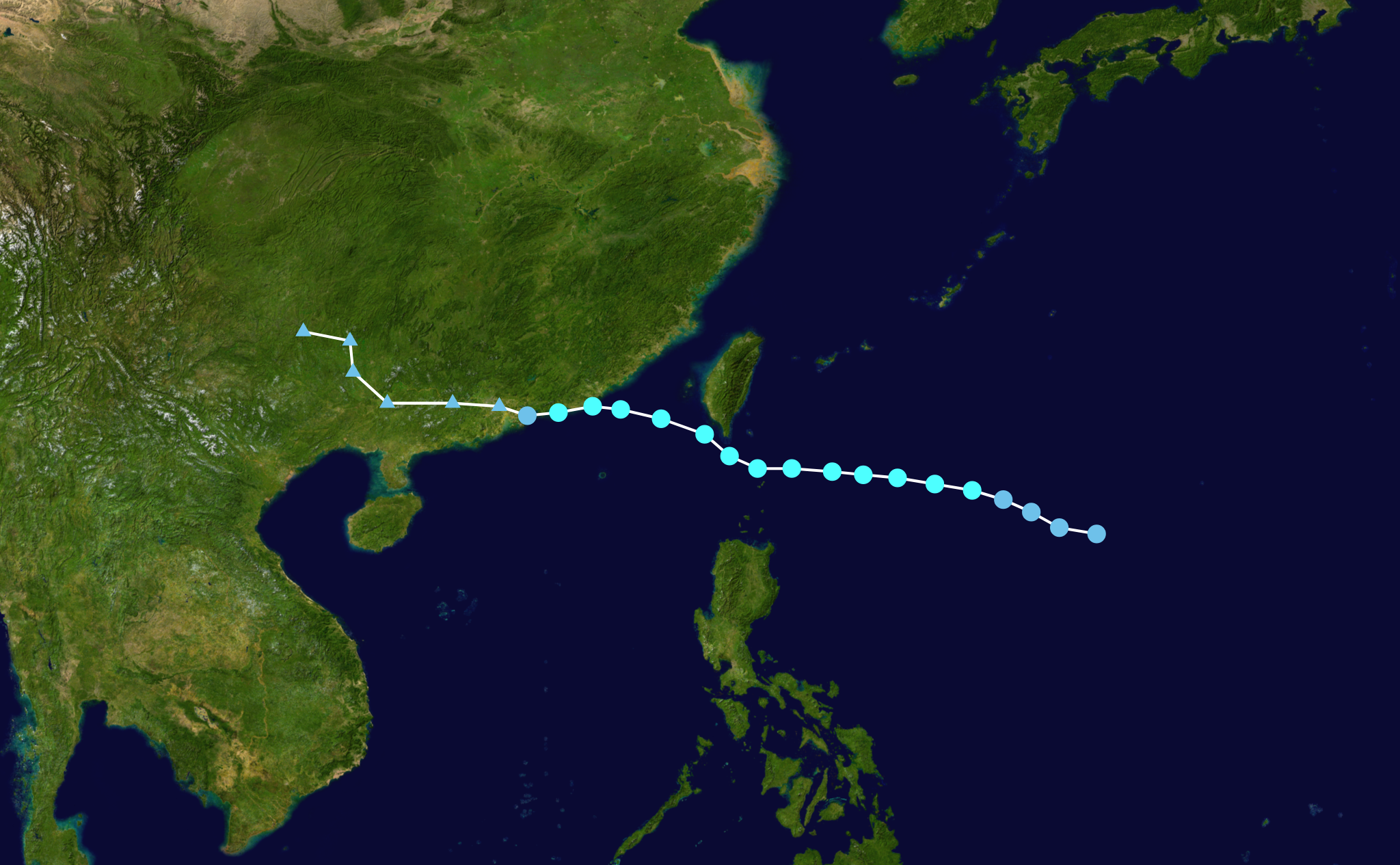
- Duration: July 25 – July 31
- Peak intensity: 100 km/h (65 mph) (10-min); 975 hPa (mbar)

A tropical depression formed northeast of Luzon on July 25 and was subsequently named Gordon the following day. Gordon brushed Taiwan's coast before making landfall over Guangdong's eastern coast and dissipating inland. ₱3 million (US$400,000) was dealt in Luzon. The storm brought heavy rain with minor flooding in Hong Kong.

=== Tropical Depression 11W (Luding) ===
- Tropical depression (PAGASA)
- Tropical depression (SSHWS)
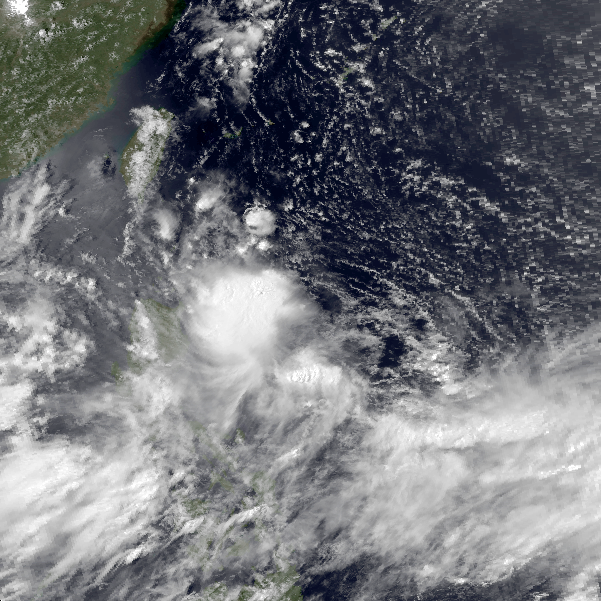
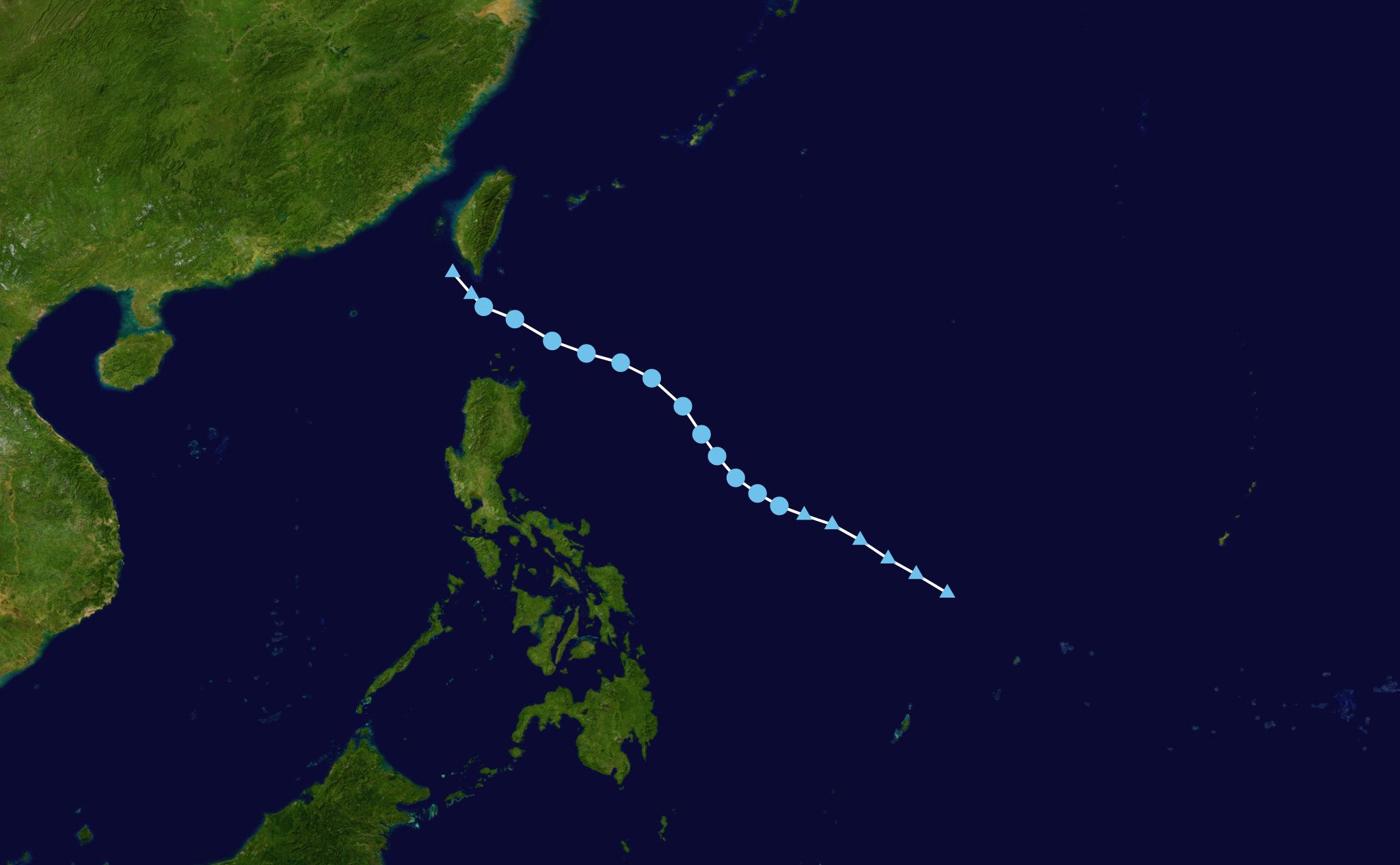
- Duration: August 2 – August 7
- Peak intensity: 55 km/h (35 mph) (10-min); 997 hPa (mbar)

11W was tracked by PAGASA.

=== Typhoon Irving (Mameng) ===
- Typhoon (JMA)
- Category 2 typhoon (SSHWS)
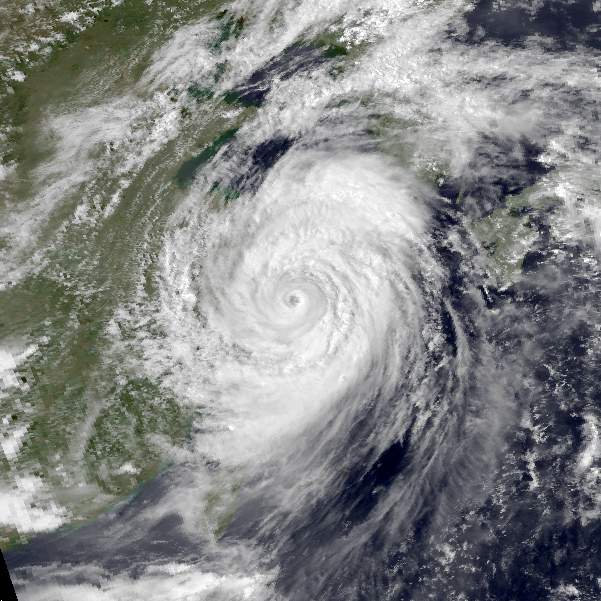
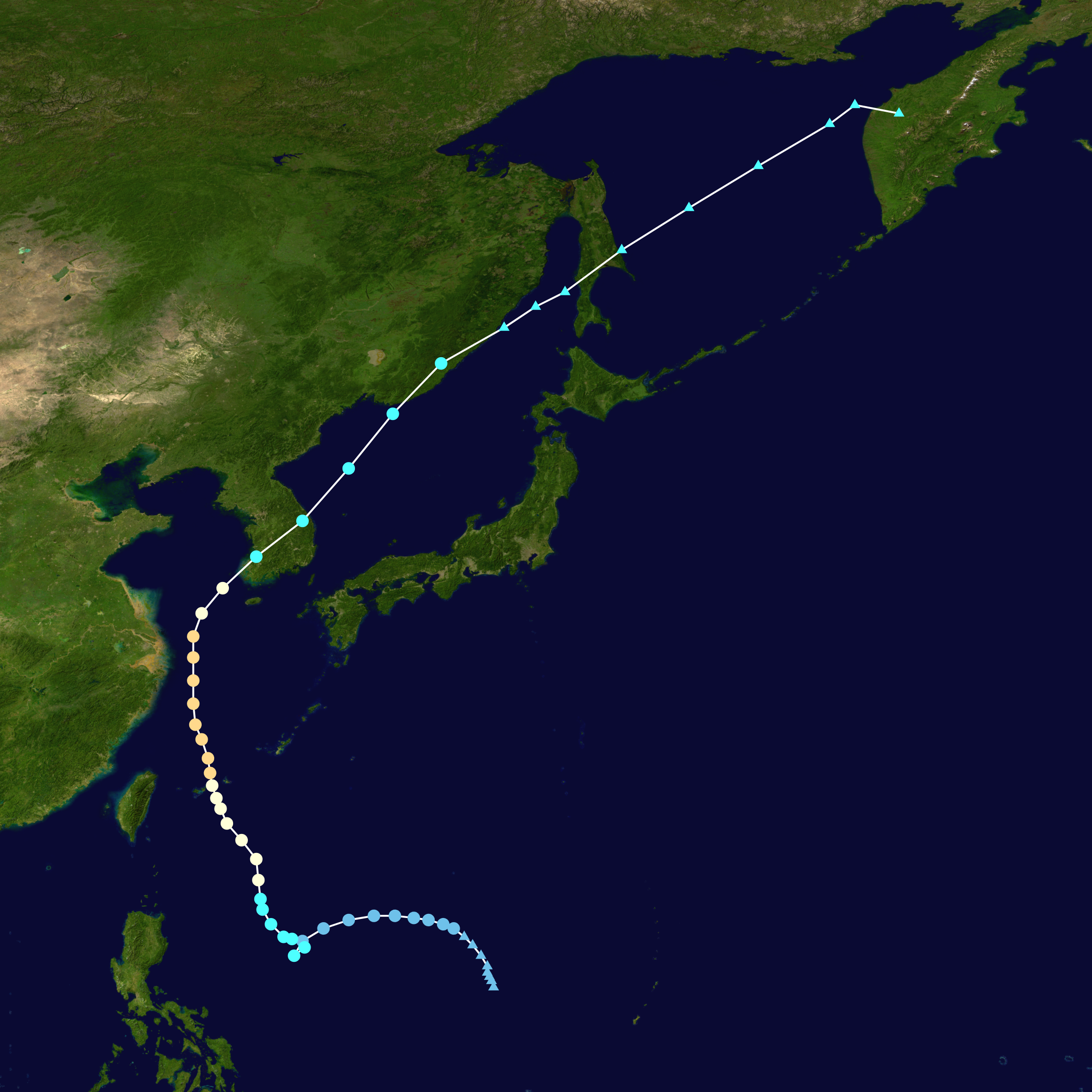
- Duration: August 7 – August 18
- Peak intensity: 150 km/h (90 mph) (10-min); 955 hPa (mbar)

The monsoon trough spawned a tropical depression on August 7 to the east of the Philippines. It tracked to the north then to the west. Steering currents weakened, causing the depression to loop to the north. It was able to strengthen there, reaching tropical storm status on the 11th and typhoon status on the 13th. Irving continued to the north, attaining a peak of 100 mph winds on the 15th. Its broad, loose wind field prevented it from strengthening further, and Irving weakened as it continued northward. On the 17th, Irving hit southwest South Korea as a minimal typhoon, and merged with a frontal boundary over extreme eastern Russia on the 18th. Torrential rains led to 150 fatalities, with damage at $10–$20 million (1979 USD). In the Philippines, Irving caused ₱45 million (US$6.1 million) of damage and 24 deaths.

=== Typhoon Judy (Neneng) ===
- Violent typhoon (JMA)
- Category 4 super typhoon (SSHWS)
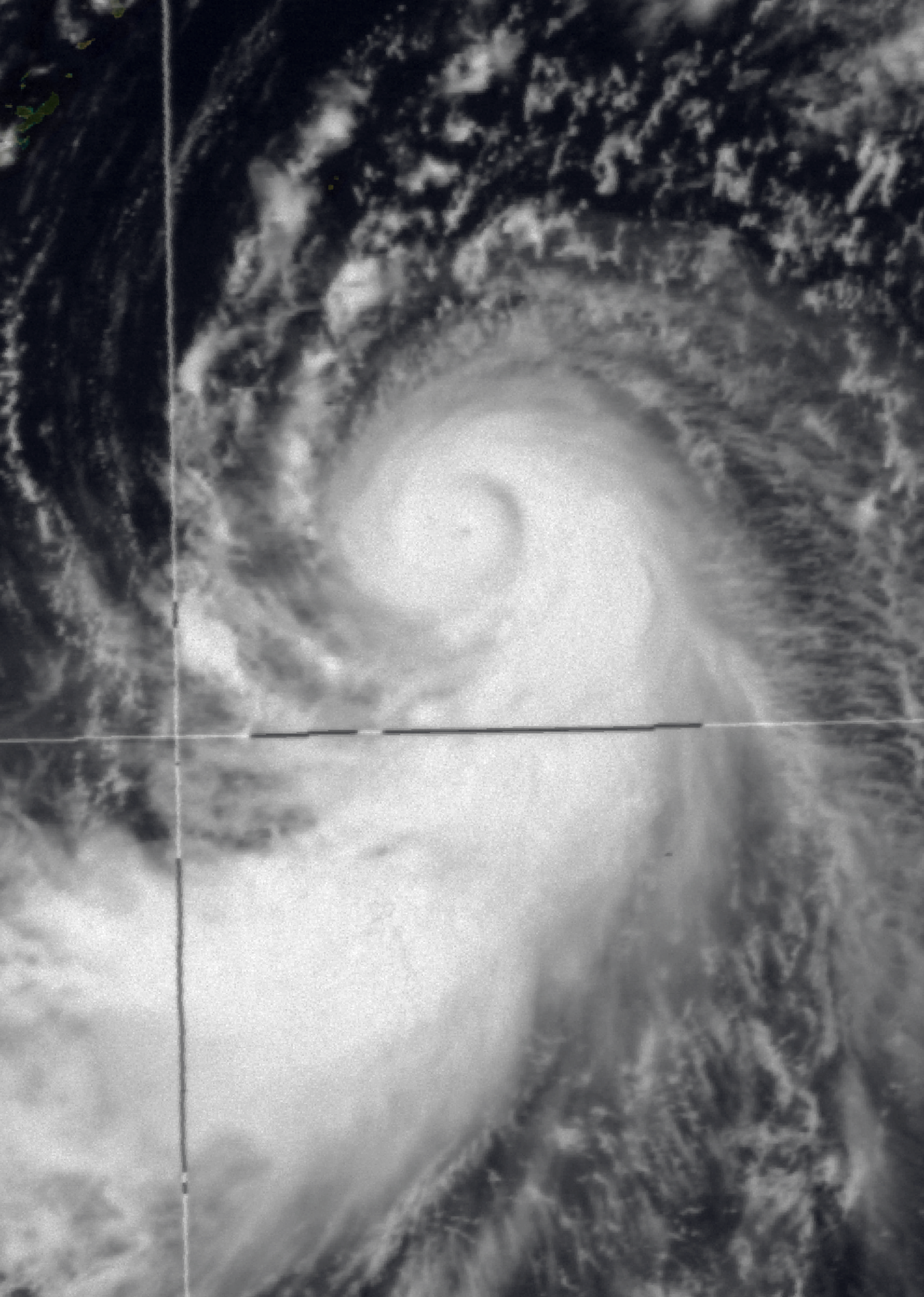
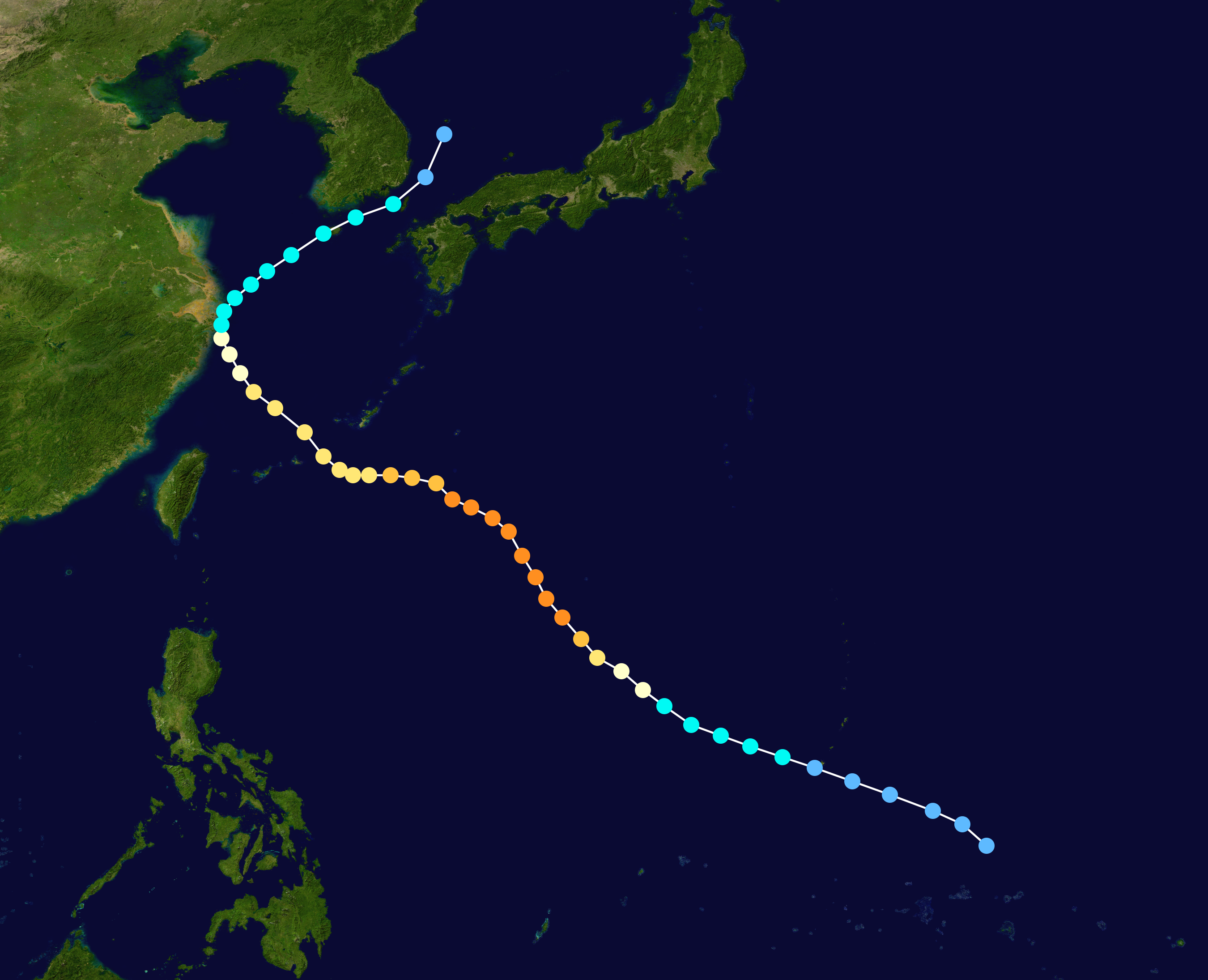
- Duration: August 16 – August 26
- Peak intensity: 205 km/h (125 mph) (10-min); 910 hPa (mbar)

A tropical disturbance organized into a tropical storm on August 15. It tracked to the northwest, becoming a tropical storm on the 17th. Judy rapidly intensified, reaching typhoon status on the 18th, peaking with winds of 155 mph and a central pressure of 887 mb according to the JTWC on the 20th. It also had an eye temperature of 34.0 °C (93.2 °F) at 700 hPa height, making it the warmest eye of a tropical cyclone on record. The super typhoon began to weaken as it passed south of Okinawa, and neared the Chinese coast on the 23rd and 24th. Judy turned to the northeast, and brushed past South Korea as a tropical depression on the 26th, shortly before dissipating. Judy passed through Guam and other Pacific islands, but damage was reported light there. However, the storm brought heavy rain to Korea as a tropical depression, killing 111 and causing more damage to an area hit by Irving just weeks before.

=== Tropical Depression 14W ===
- Tropical depression (SSHWS)
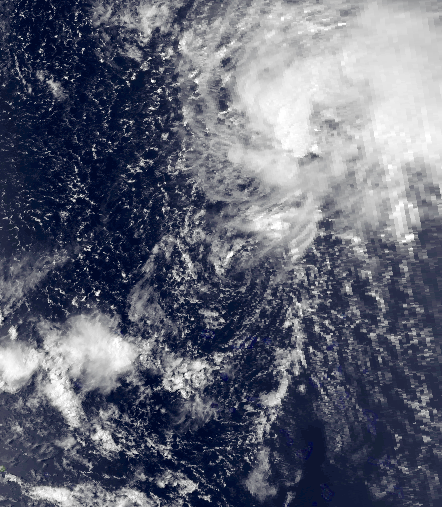
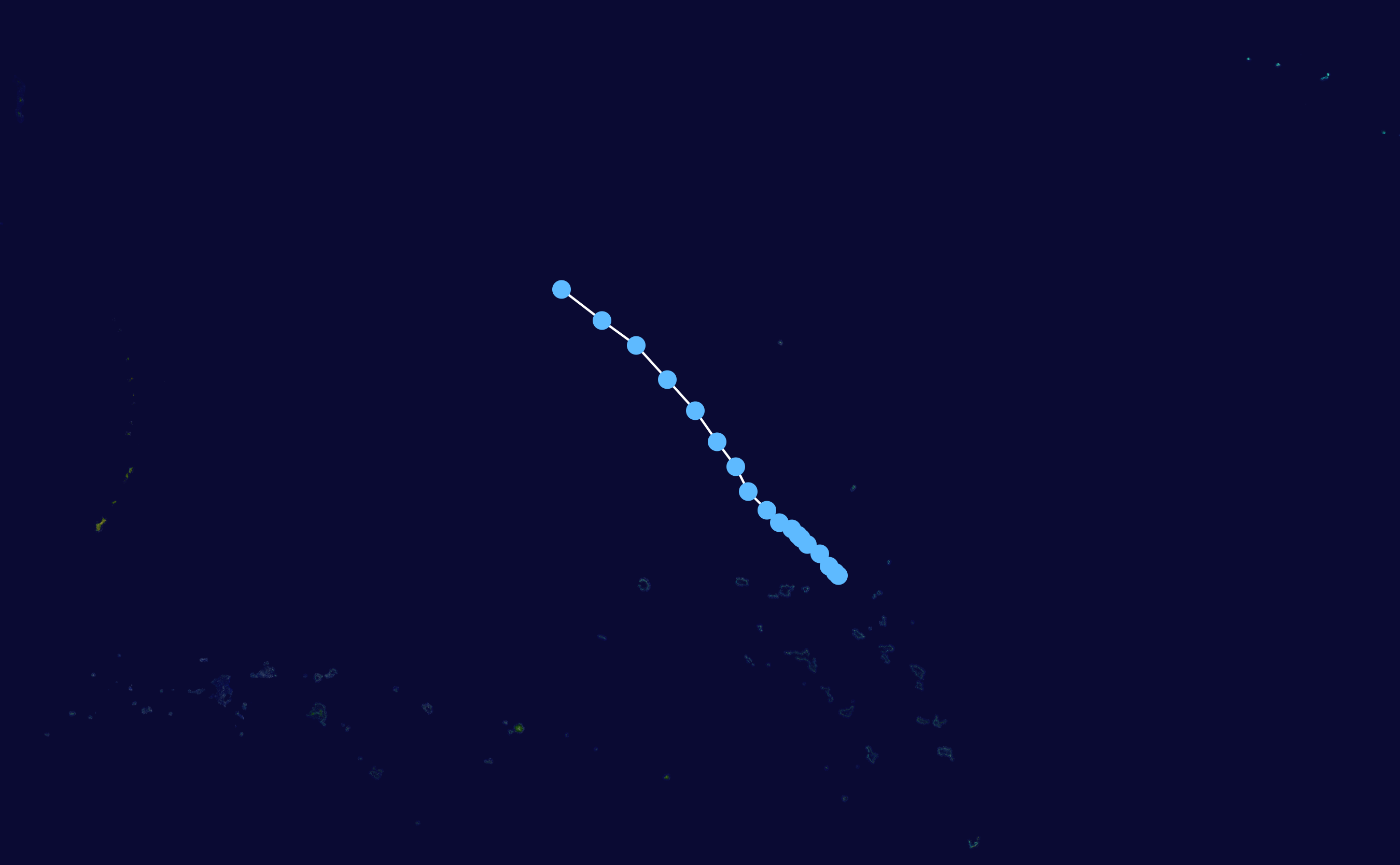
- Duration: August 18 – August 20
- Peak intensity: 35 km/h (25 mph) (1-min); 1005 hPa (mbar)

14W lasted three days from August 18–20 producing only minimal winds.

=== Tropical Storm Ken (Oniang) ===
- Tropical storm (JMA)
- Tropical storm (SSHWS)
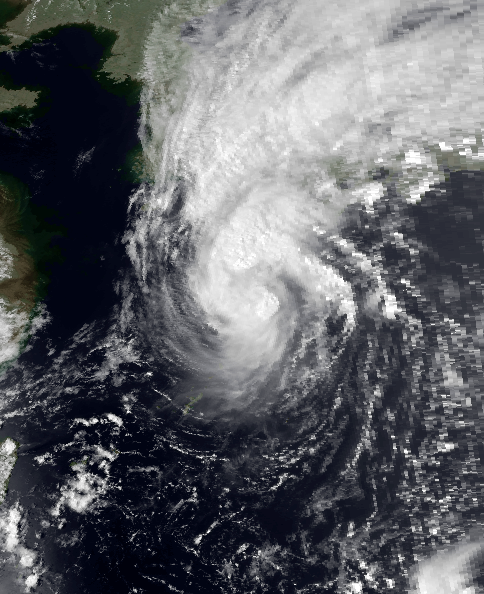
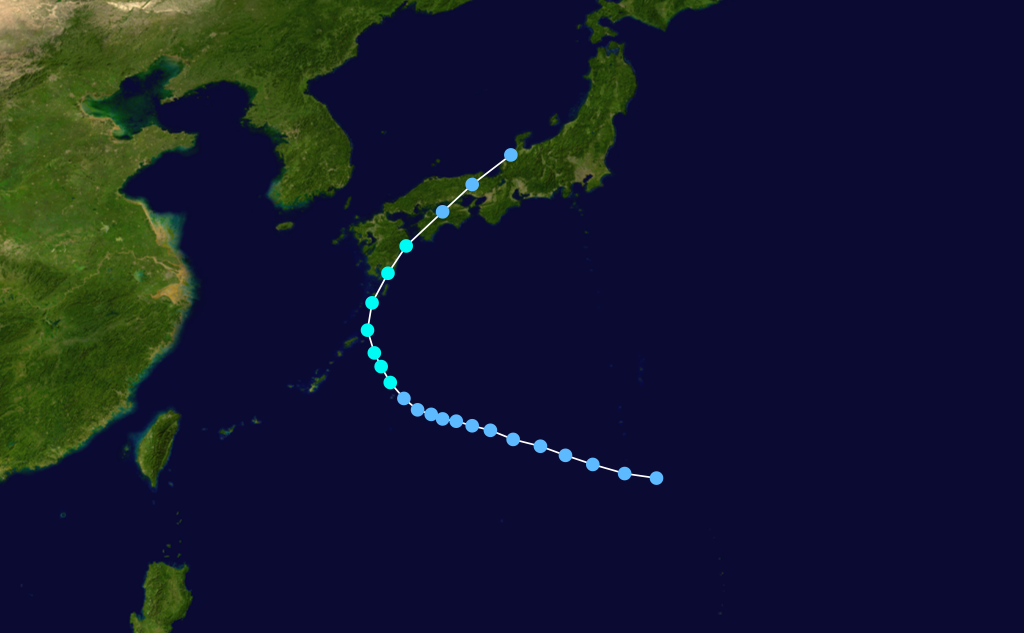
- Duration: August 30 – September 4
- Peak intensity: 85 km/h (50 mph) (10-min); 990 hPa (mbar)

A tropical disturbance developed on August 30 and became a tropical depression later that day. The depression was upgraded to a tropical storm and was named Ken. Ken reached peak winds of 70 mph (110 km/h) on September 3. The storm moved north and turned north-northeast, striking Shikoku late on the 3rd. Ken weakened over Japan and dissipated on September 4. Ken caused ¥1.259 billion (US$5.7 million) and caused two deaths.

=== Typhoon Lola ===
- Typhoon (JMA)
- Category 2 typhoon (SSHWS)
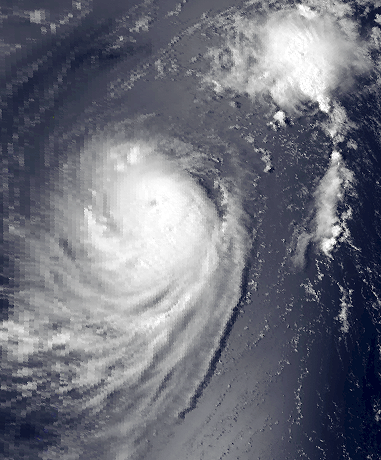
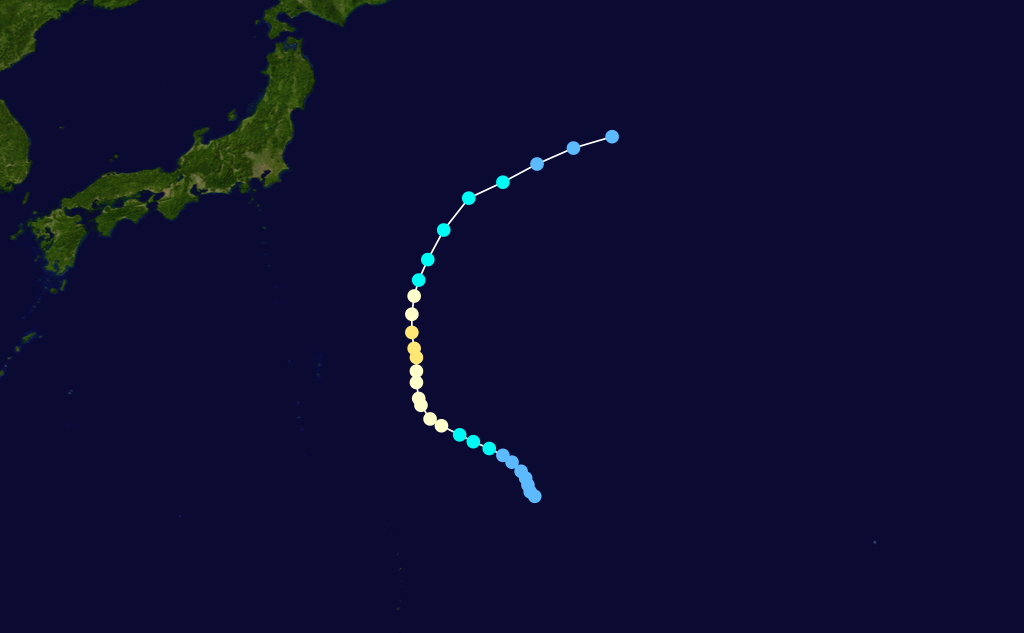
- Duration: September 1 – September 8
- Peak intensity: 150 km/h (90 mph) (10-min); 950 hPa (mbar)

Around the same time the precursor to Tropical Storm Ken developed, a tropical disturbance developed south of Marcus Island. The disturbance became a tropical depression on the 2nd and a tropical storm on the 4th. Lola was upgraded to a typhoon early on September 5. The storm continued to intensify and reached peak intensity on September 6 with winds of 105 mph (169 km/h). Lola weakened to a tropical storm on the 7th. The next day, Lola weakened to a tropical depression at 35.90N, 151.80E. Lola then transitioned into an extratropical cyclone on September 9 to the east of Japan.

=== Typhoon Mac (Pepang) ===
- Severe tropical storm (JMA)
- Category 1 typhoon (SSHWS)
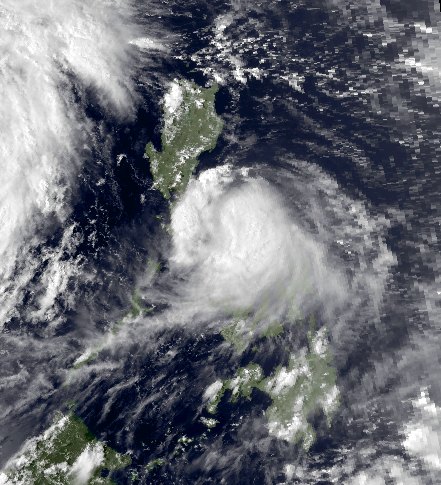
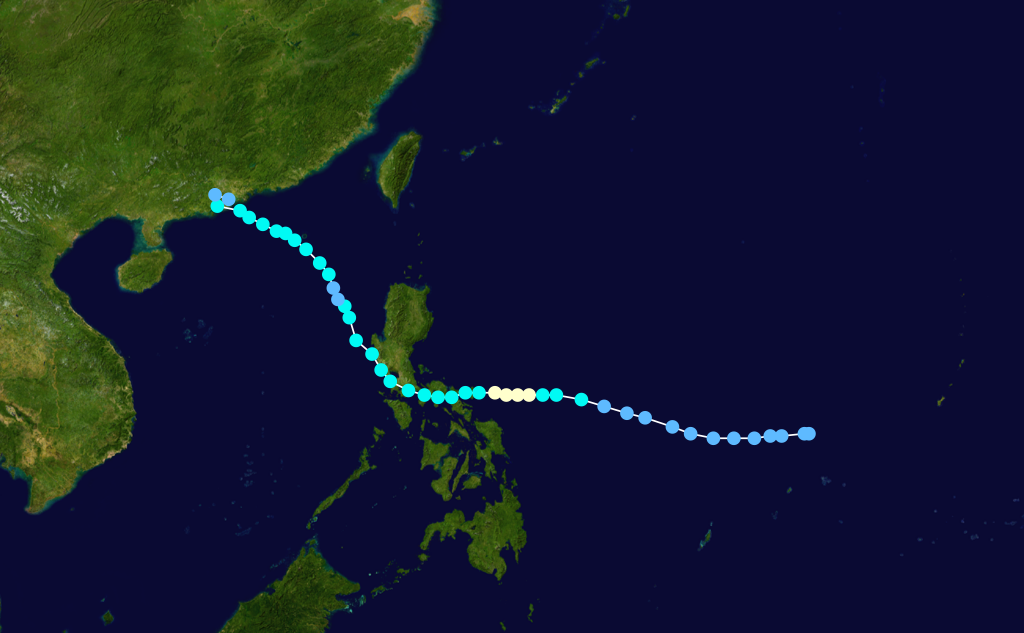
- Duration: September 12 – September 24
- Peak intensity: 100 km/h (65 mph) (10-min); 985 hPa (mbar)

A weak surface circulation formed northeast of Yap on September 12, tracking westward. On September 16, the circulation gained tropical storm intensity and was named Mac. Mac attained peak intensity before making landfall in the Philippines, causing the storm to weaken. Frictional effects caused the storm to weaken over southern Luzon. Due to Tropical Storm Nancy's development, Mac's track was influenced into the South China Sea. Mac made landfall near Hong Kong and dissipated on September 24.

In the Philippines, eight people were killed and two people were left missing. Damage totaled to ₱72 million (US$9.76 million).

=== Tropical Storm Nancy ===
- Tropical storm (JMA)
- Tropical storm (SSHWS)
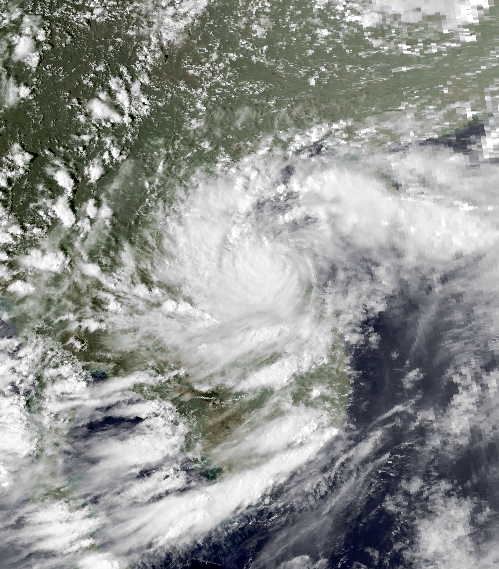
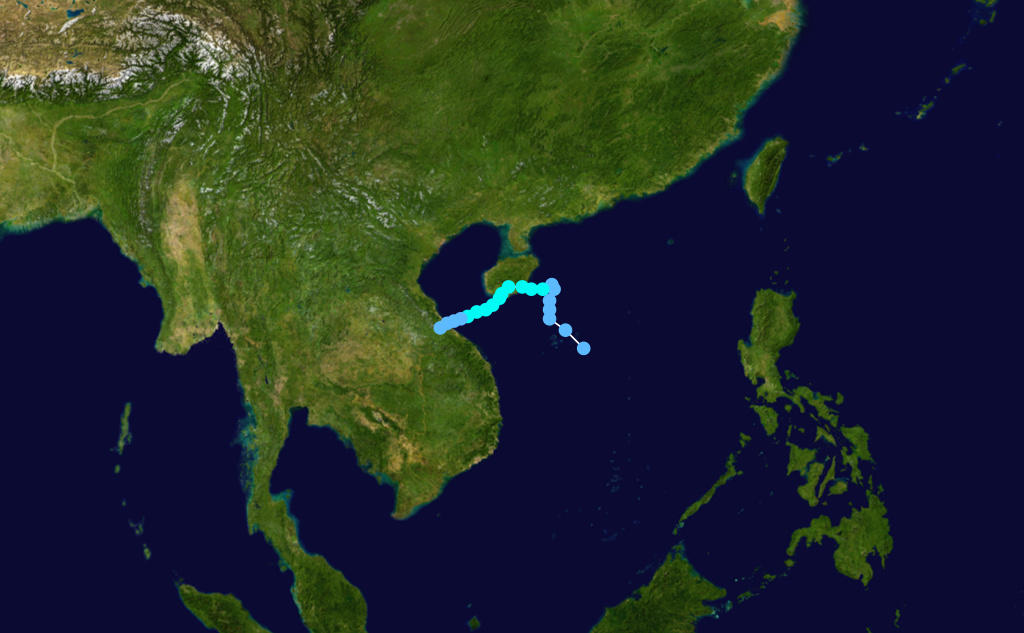
- Duration: September 17 – September 22
- Peak intensity: 85 km/h (50 mph) (10-min); 992 hPa (mbar)

On September 17, a tropical disturbance rapidly developed into a tropical storm and was given the name Nancy. Weak steering currents allowed Nancy to track across the southern portion of Hainan and do a cyclonic loop. The weak currents allowed Nancy to make landfall in Vietnam before dissipating on September 22.

=== Typhoon Owen (Rosing) ===
- Very strong typhoon (JMA)
- Category 3 typhoon (SSHWS)
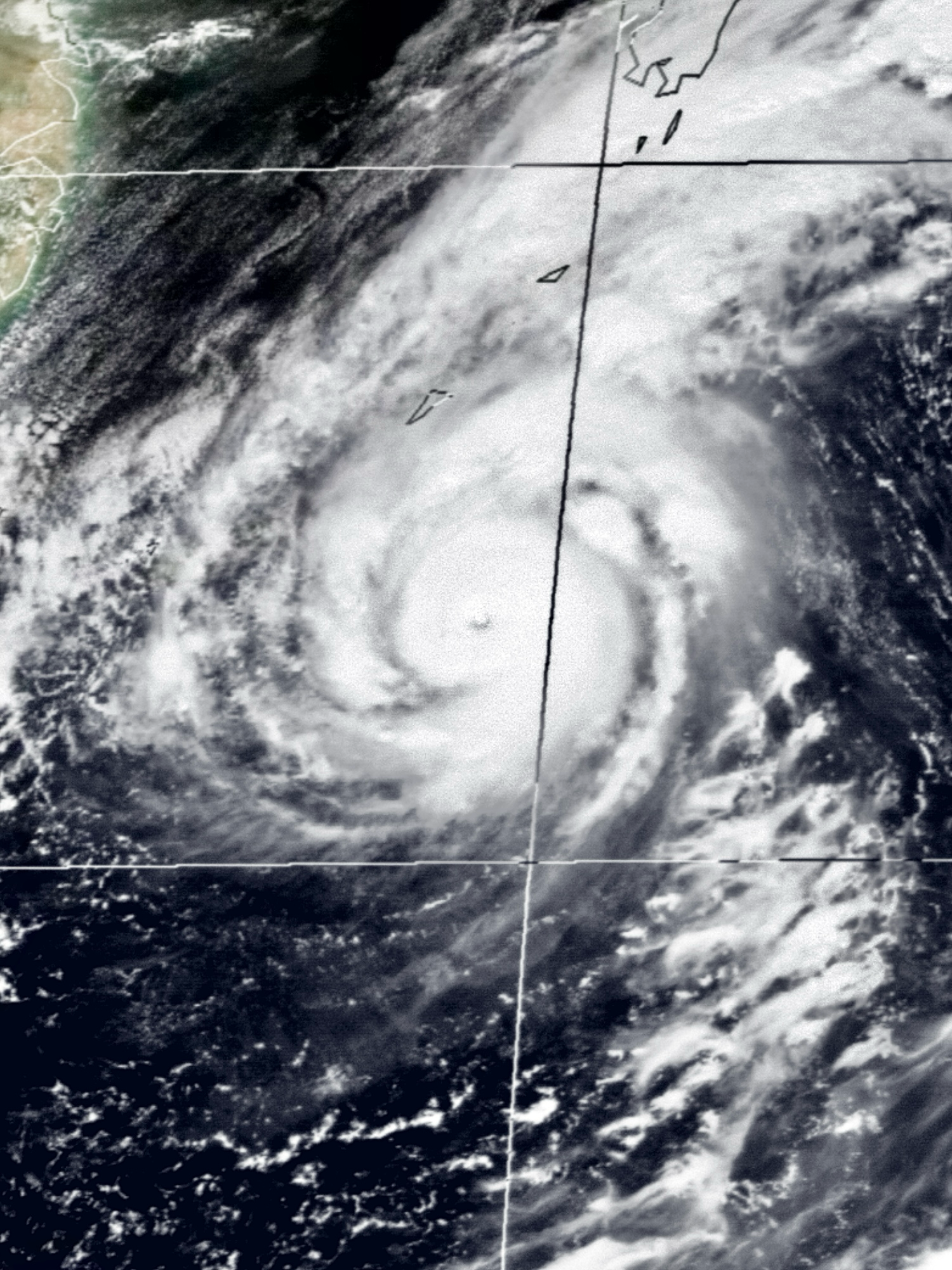
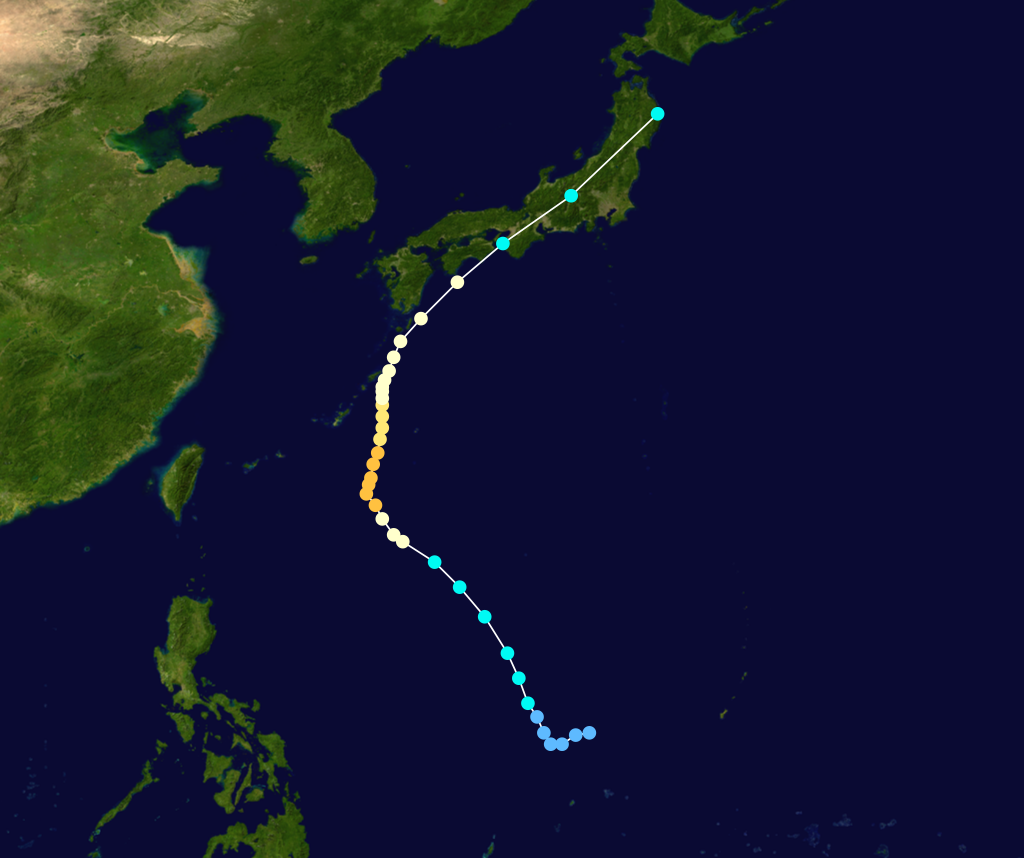
- Duration: September 22 – October 1
- Peak intensity: 165 km/h (105 mph) (10-min); 920 hPa (mbar)

A tropical disturbance developed south of Guam during September 19. The disturbance was upgraded to a tropical depression on September 22. It then was upgraded to a tropical storm the next day. Owen was upgraded to a typhoon on the 25th. Owen then reached its peak intensity on September 26 with winds of 125 mph (201 km/h). Owen then started to weaken as the storm moved northward. By the 30th, Owen made landfall near Osaka, Japan and weakened to a tropical storm. Owen then transitioned into an extratropical cyclone on October 1. In Japan, Owen killed 12 people, injured another 83, and caused ¥107.4 billion (US$490 million).

=== Tropical Storm Pamela ===
- Tropical storm (JMA)
- Tropical storm (SSHWS)
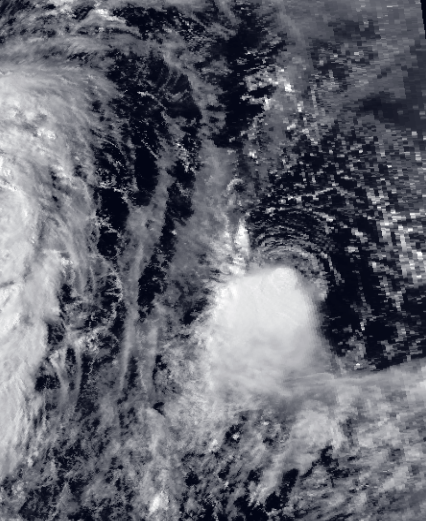
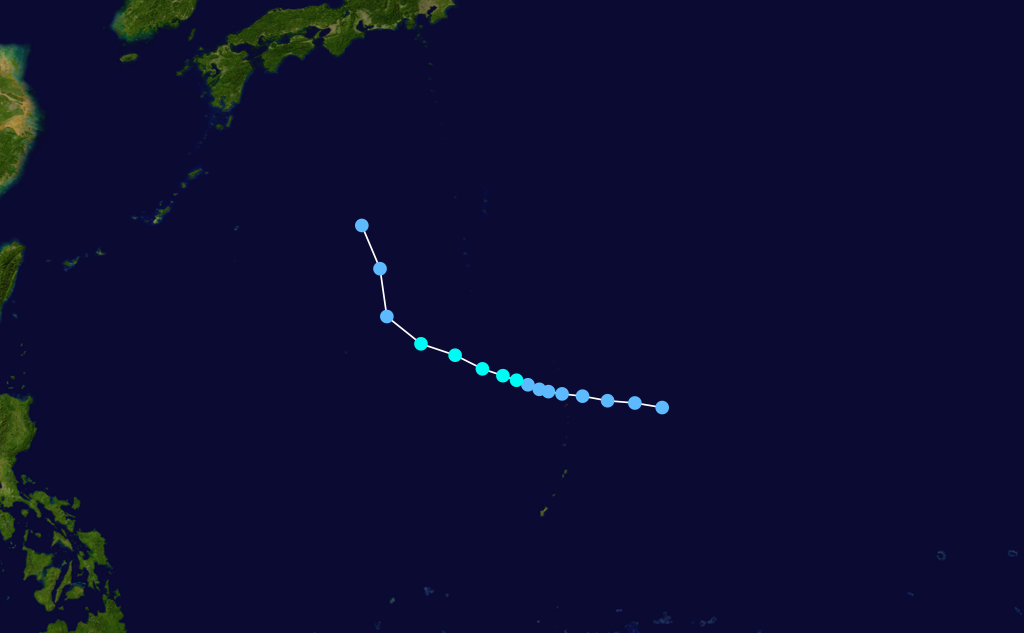
- Duration: September 23 – September 26
- Peak intensity: 75 km/h (45 mph) (10-min); 995 hPa (mbar)

Developing at the apex of a wave in the easterly flow in late September 1979, Tropical Storm Pamela formed on September 23 and dissipated on September 26, due to strong shear caused by the nearby Typhoon Owen.

=== Typhoon Sarah (Sisang-Uring) ===
- Very strong typhoon (JMA)
- Category 3 typhoon (SSHWS)
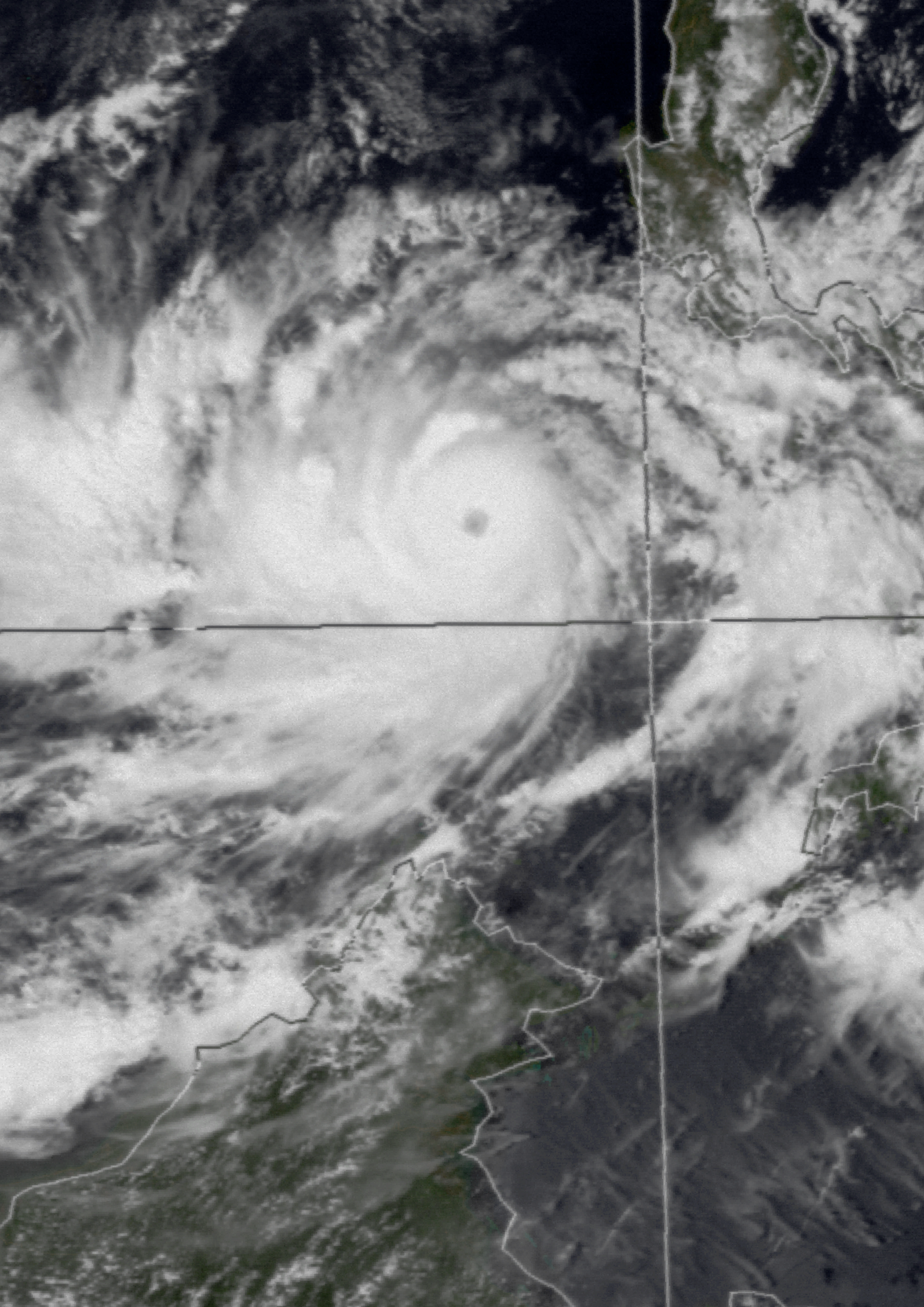
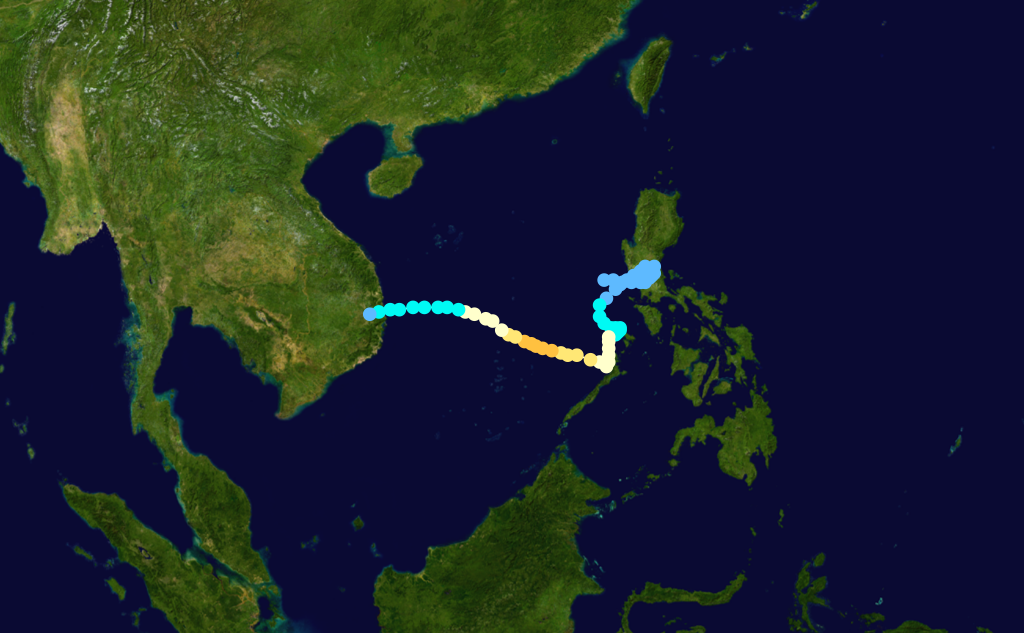
- Duration: October 1 – October 17
- Peak intensity: 165 km/h (105 mph) (10-min); 930 hPa (mbar)

The monsoon trough spawned a disturbance in the eastern Vietnamese Sea on September 30, which developed into Tropical Depression Sisang on October 1. It drifted eastward into Luzon, and looped to the southwest, where it strengthened into a tropical storm, with the JTWC naming the storm Sarah on October 4. Around this time, the PAGASA renamed the system as Uring. Sarah, with weak steering currents, drifted to the south, becoming a typhoon on October 7, before making landfall on Palawan Island. The storm turned to the west, peaking with 130 mph winds on October 10, before the mid-level circulation became decoupled from the low-level circulation. Sarah weakened, and hit eastern Vietnam on October 14 as a 60 mph tropical storm. The storm brought heavy flooding and wind, causing massive crop damage and loss of life. Sarah then weakened to a low-pressure area on October 15, but its remnants turned eastward towards Manila, Philippines, before curving westward towards Vietnam again. The storm's remnants fully dissipated on October 23. In the Philippines, one person was killed and damage totaled to ₱21 million (US$2.85 million).

=== Tropical Storm Roger (Trining) ===
- Tropical storm (JMA)
- Tropical storm (SSHWS)
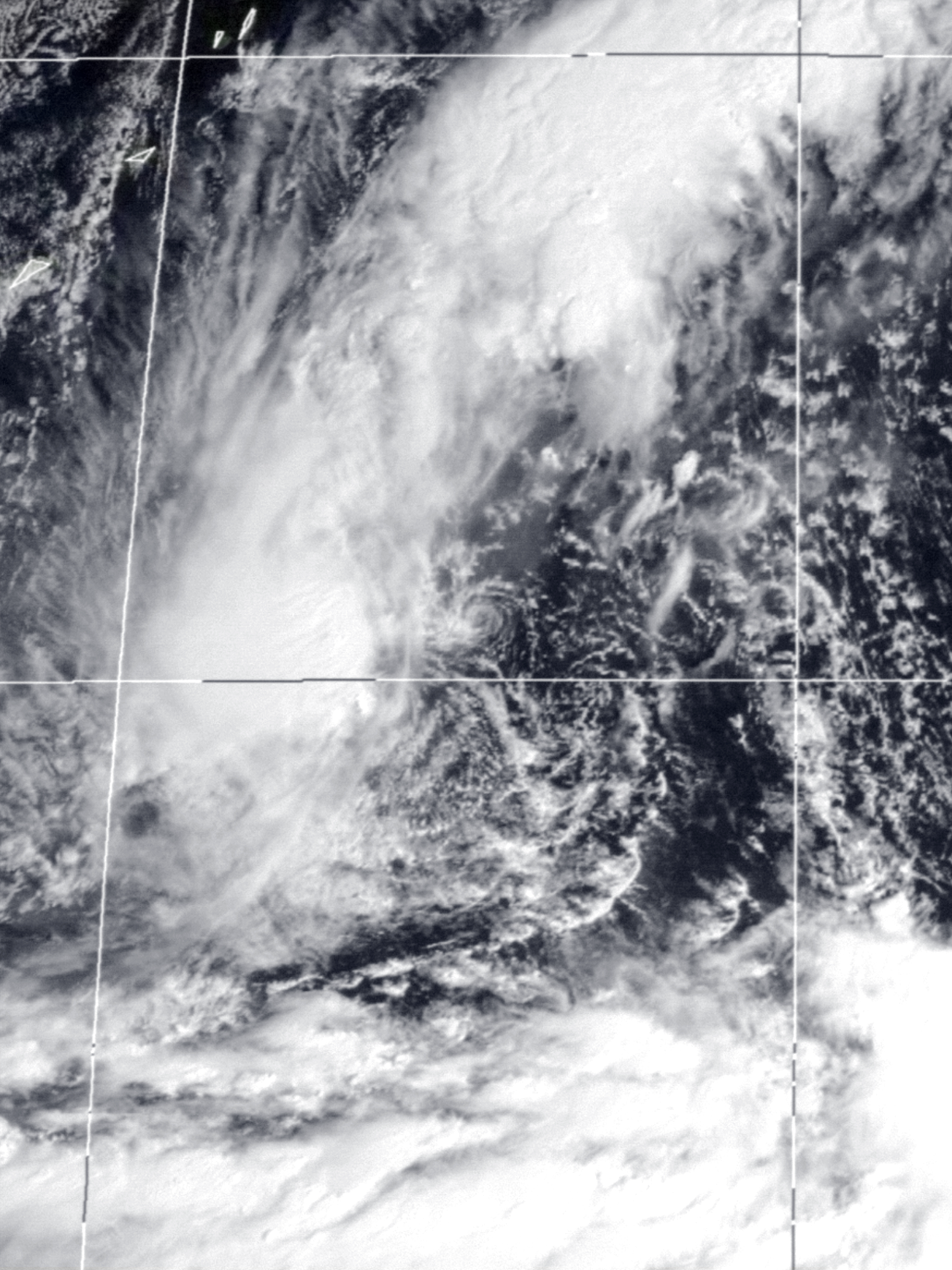
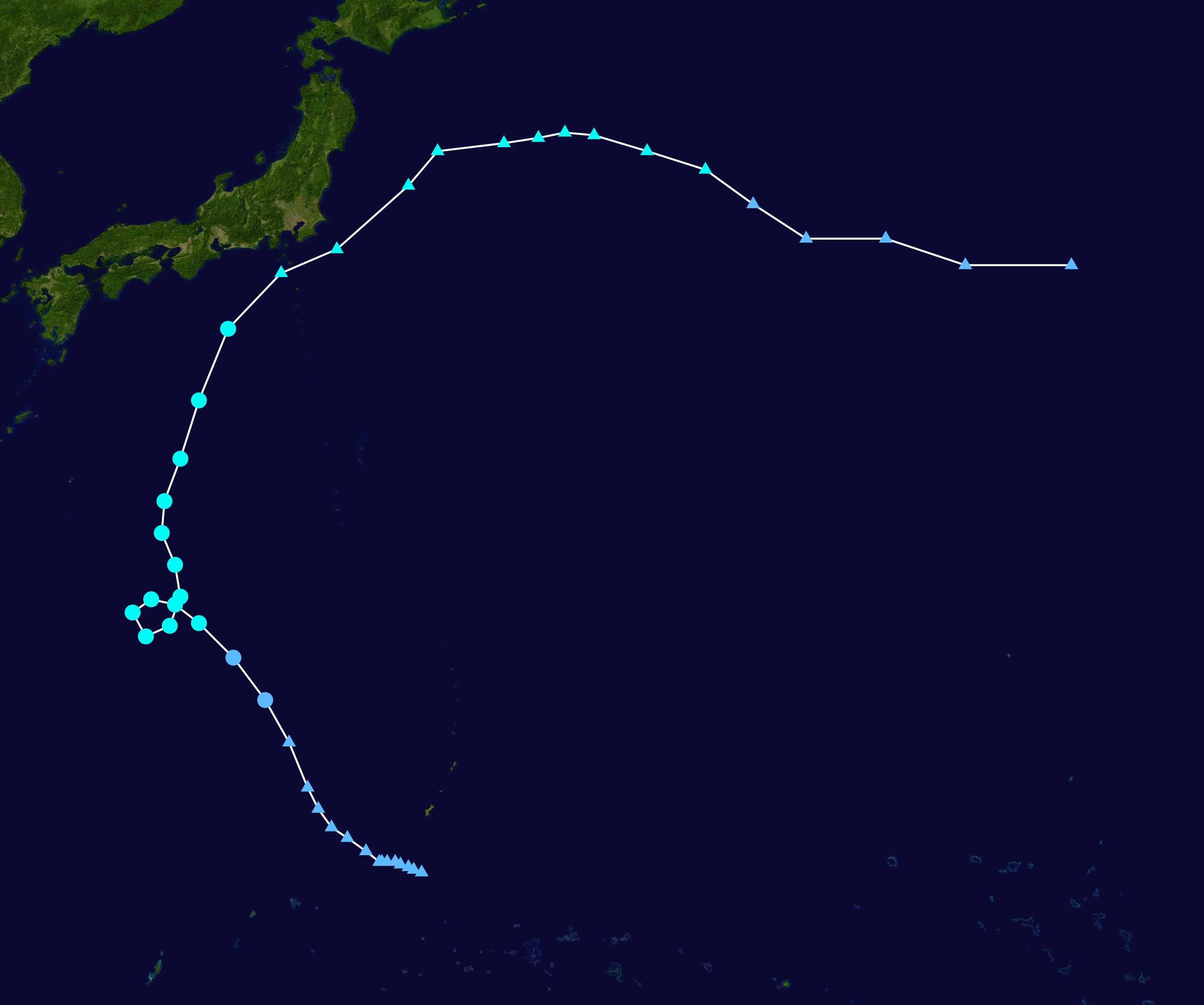
- Duration: October 3 – October 7
- Peak intensity: 85 km/h (50 mph) (10-min); 985 hPa (mbar)

Convective activity increased in the monsoon trough that extended over the Caroline Islands on September 28. Post-analysis indicated the existence of a weak circulation southwest of Guam around that time, which was to become Tropical Storm Roger. On October 3, the system organized into Tropical Depression 21W, which was subsequently upgraded to a tropical storm and named Roger on October 4. Strong flow from the equator was drawn into Roger's circulation, preventing development to a disturbance to the east which would become Typhoon Tip. A strong mid-level southeasterly steering current caused Roger to move northwest. Roger then executed a cyclonic loop on October 5. The storm continued to move northwest until north of the ridge axis, after which it turned in a north-northeastward direction. Roger then became an extratropical cyclone on October 7, as it merged with a cold front south of Japan.

=== Typhoon Tip (Warling) ===
- Violent typhoon (JMA)
- Category 5 super typhoon (SSHWS)
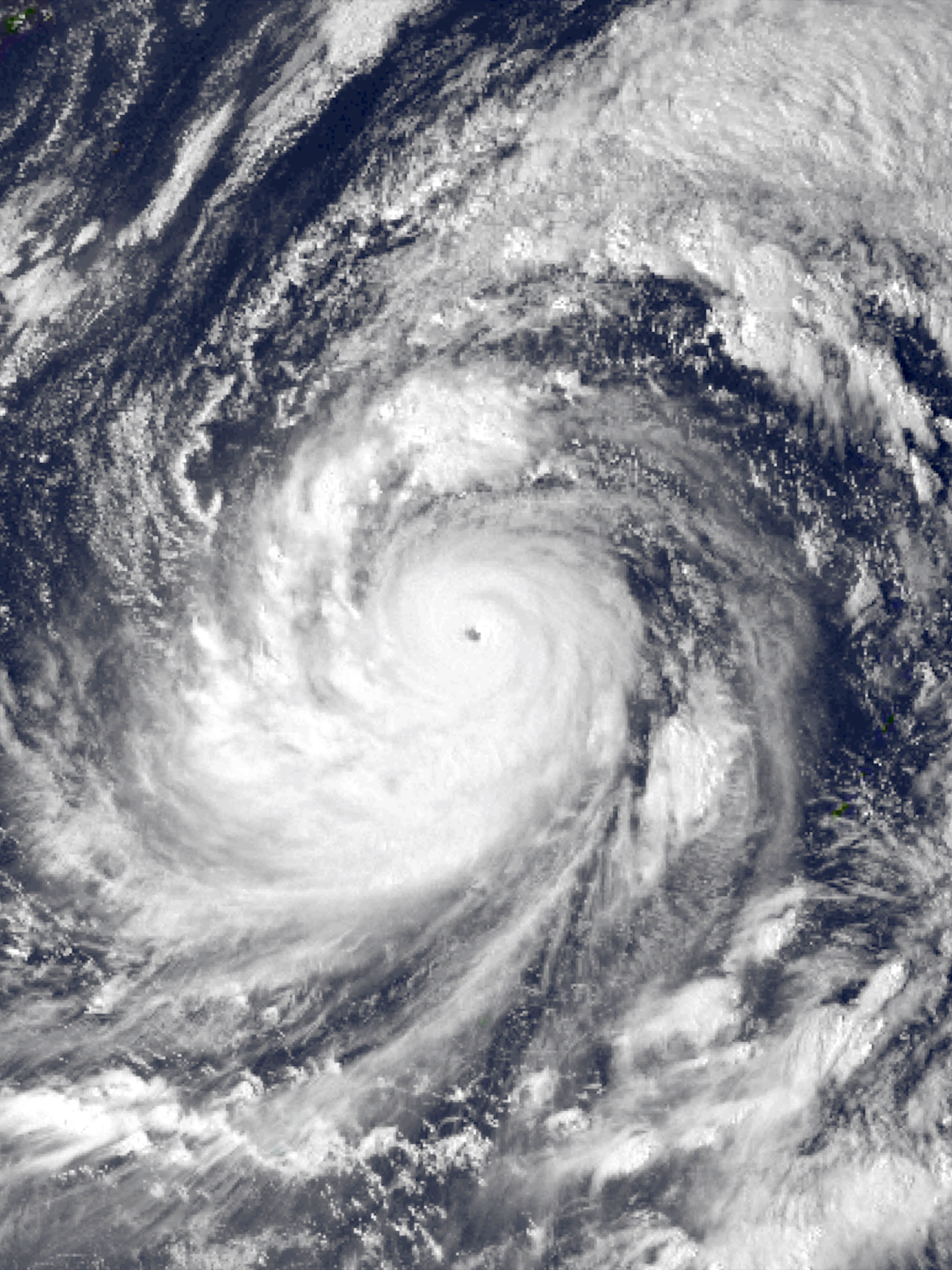
- Duration: October 4 – October 19
- Peak intensity: 260 km/h (160 mph) (10-min); 870 hPa (mbar)

Typhoon Tip is considered to be both the most intense tropical cyclone ever recorded in the world, with a minimum pressure of 870 mbar, as well as the largest ever recorded, with a diameter of more than 2,000 km (1,200 mi). The cyclone formed on October 5, and after moving into a very favorable environment for development, quickly strengthened into Super Typhoon Tip on the 11th. On the 12th, Super Typhoon Tip continued to intensify, with winds at 190 miles per hour and central pressure at 870 millibars, the lowest barometric pressure ever recorded from a tropical cyclone. Tip ultimately hit Japan, causing 68 deaths and moderate damage. The storm became extratropical on October 19, and was last tracked to a point near the Alaskan Aleutian Islands. Tip may have made landfall as an extratropical cyclone near Cold Bay, in Alaska.

=== Typhoon Vera (Yayang) ===
- Violent typhoon (JMA)
- Category 5 super typhoon (SSHWS)
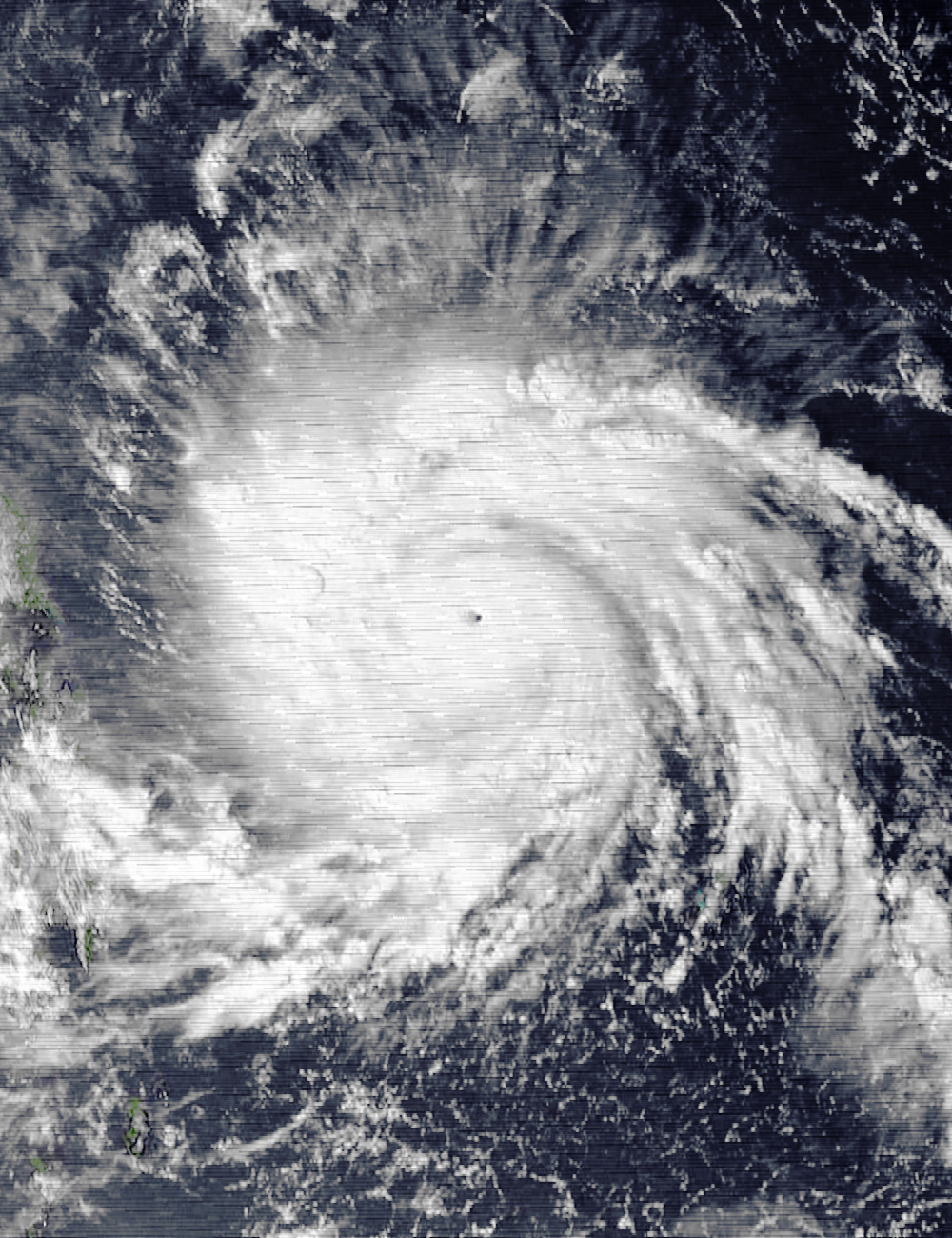
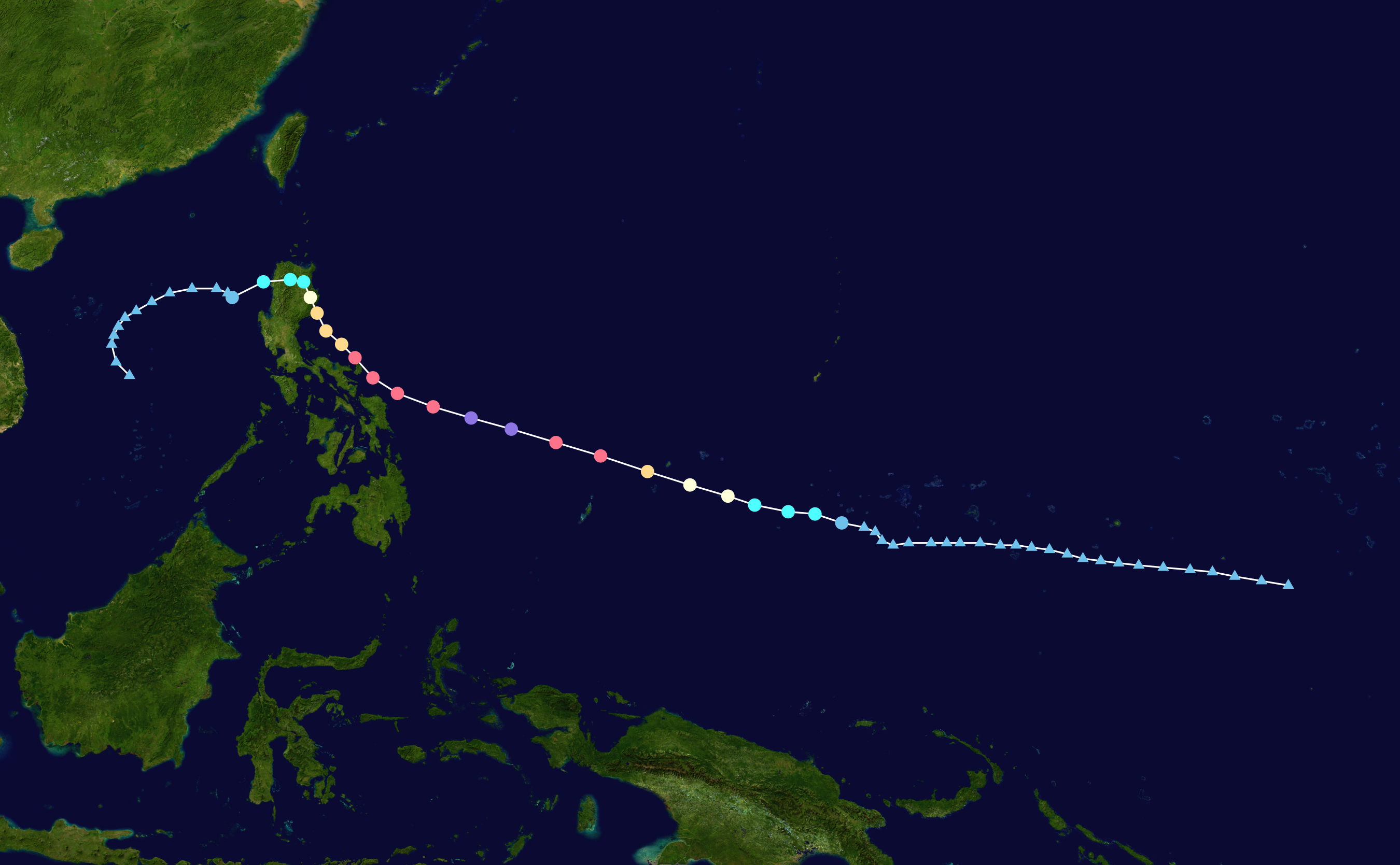
- Duration: November 2 – November 7
- Peak intensity: 205 km/h (125 mph) (10-min); 915 hPa (mbar)

Vera began as a tropical disturbance in the near equatorial trough on October 27. The disturbance rapidly intensified into a tropical storm and was named Vera on November 2. Vera continued to intensify and reached typhoon strength on November 3. The storm rapidly intensified, reaching its peak intensity as a super typhoon with 160 mph (260 km/h) winds on November 4. Reconnaissance aircraft indicated that Vera maintained its peak strength for 24 hours before weakening as it approached Catanduanes Island. The next day, Vera weakened to a category 4 storm with 130 mph (210 km/h) winds. The Philippines began restricting low-level inflow as Vera continued northwestward toward northern Luzon. Vera made landfall north of Tarigtig Point with winds of 105 mph (169 km/h) on the 6th. Shortly after making landfall, an enhanced low-level northeasterly flow over the Taiwan Strait coupled with strong upper-level southwesterlies over the Philippines resulted in the storm's weakening. After moving into the South China Sea, the strong northeast monsoon flow accelerated Vera southwestward and Vera dissipated at 12:00 UTC November 7. In the Philippines, six people were killed and damaged totaled to ₱4.5 million (US$610,000).

=== Severe Tropical Storm Wayne (Ading) ===
- Severe tropical storm (JMA)
- Tropical storm (SSHWS)
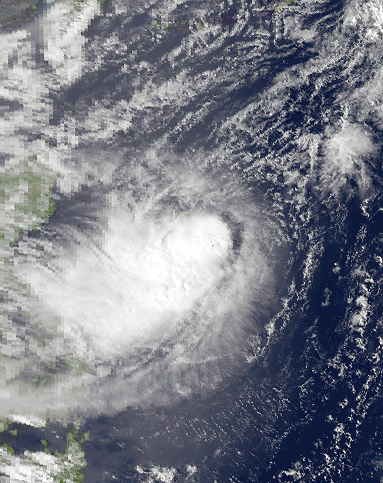
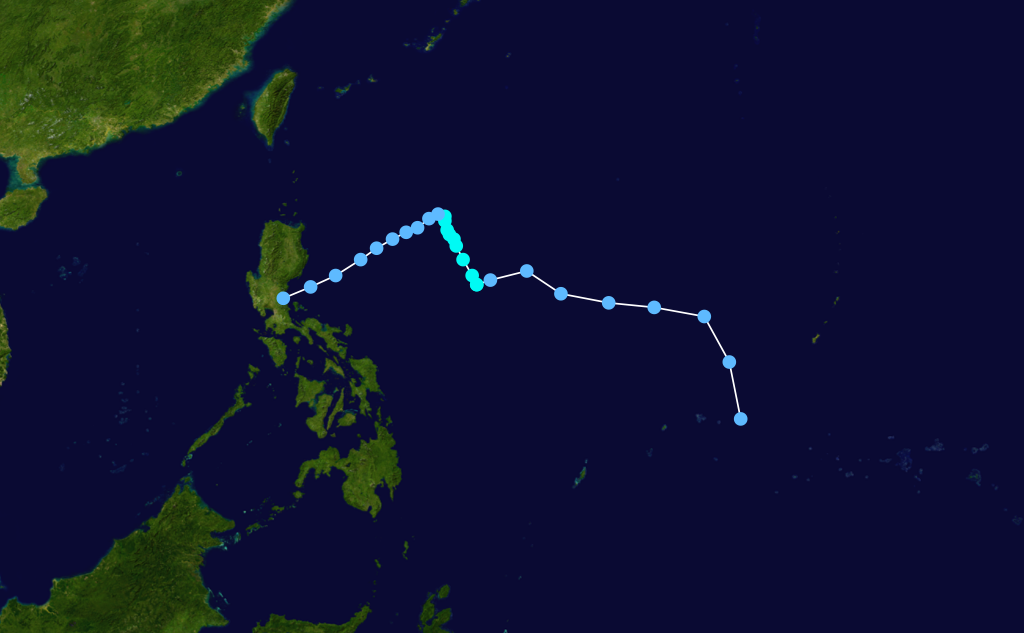
- Duration: November 7 – November 13
- Peak intensity: 95 km/h (60 mph) (10-min); 990 hPa (mbar)

A mid-level circulation was detected on satellite imagery in early November. Wayne moved to the north initially and began to develop more definitive surface circulation on November 7. Wayne turned to the west, tracking toward the central Philippines on November 11. Wayne dissipated as it made landfall in Luzon on November 13.

=== Tropical Depression 26W ===
- Tropical depression (SSHWS)
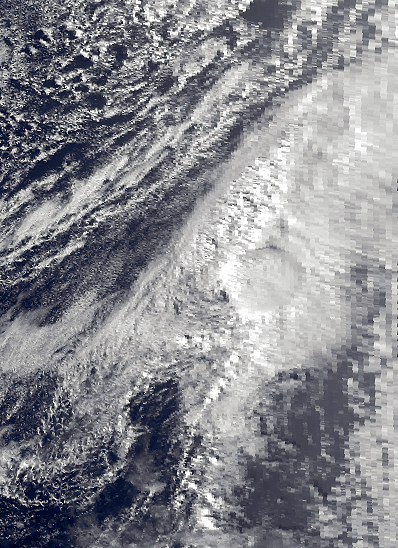
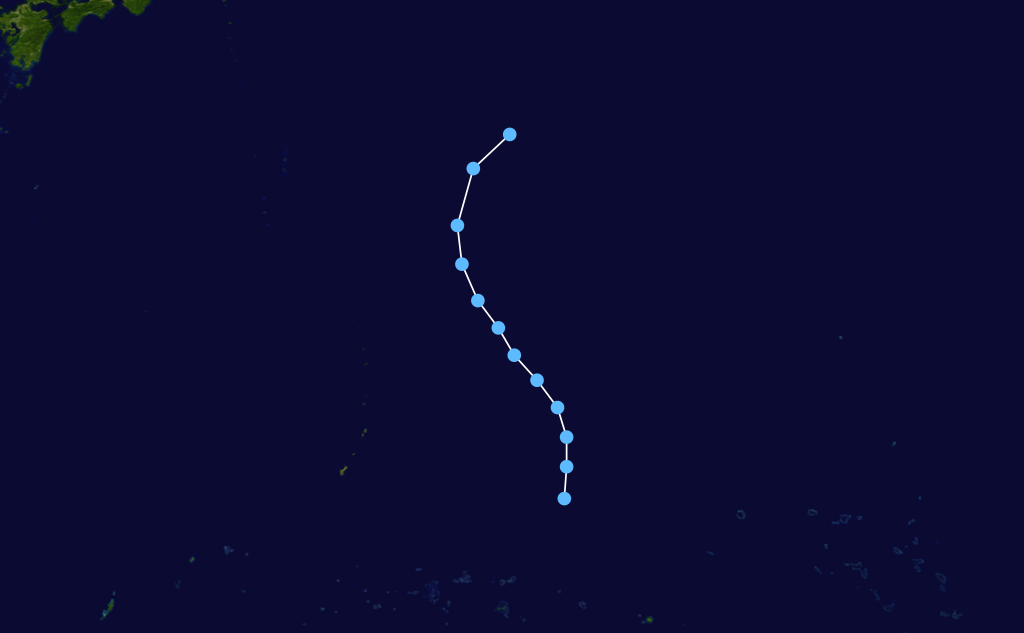
- Duration: December 1 – December 2
- Peak intensity: 55 km/h (35 mph) (1-min); 1000 hPa (mbar)

Tropical Depression 26W did not last long. It was short-lived over the Western Pacific, impacting no major land masses and causing no damage.

=== Typhoon Abby (Barang) ===
- Very strong typhoon (JMA)
- Category 3 typhoon (SSHWS)
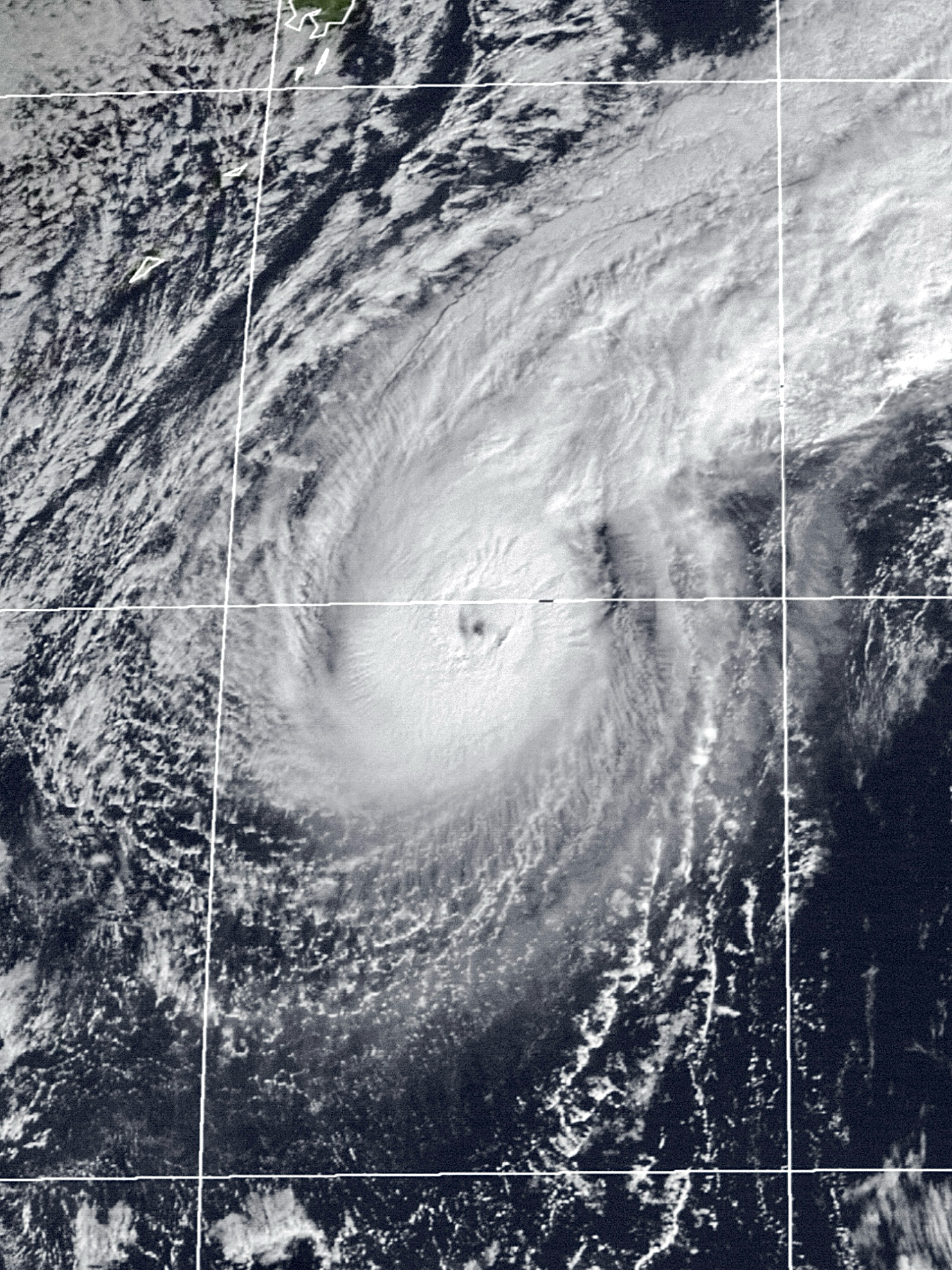
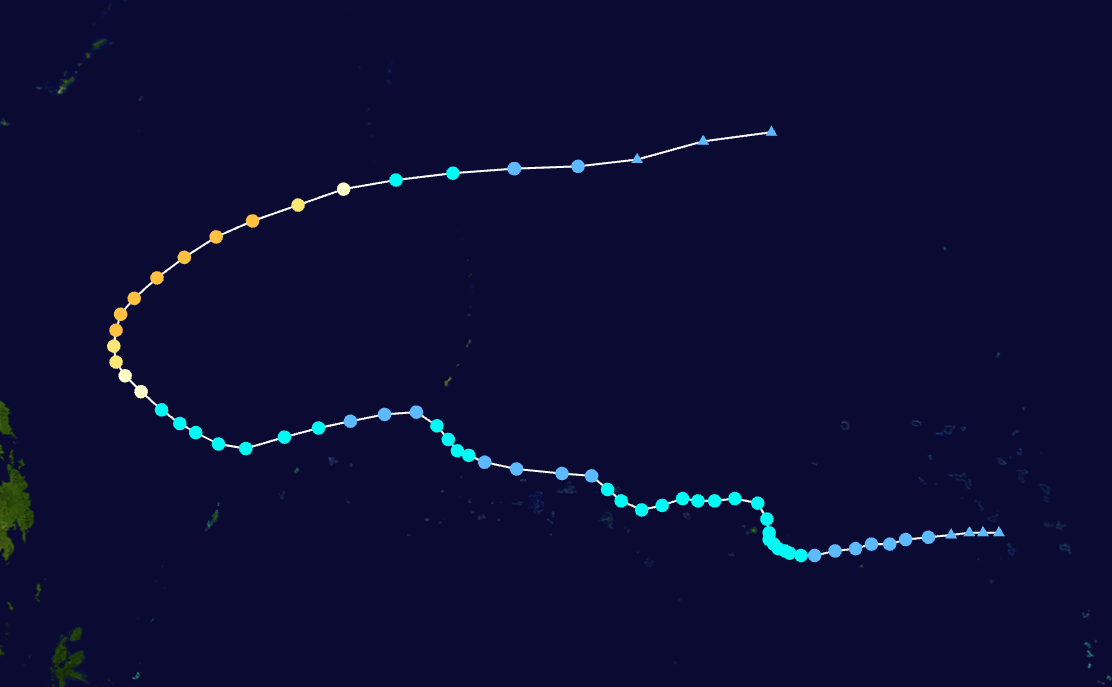
- Duration: December 1 – December 14
- Peak intensity: 165 km/h (105 mph) (10-min); 950 hPa (mbar)

A tropical disturbance developed over the Marshall Islands on November 29. The disturbance then intensified into Tropical Depression 27W on December 1. 27W then intensified into a tropical storm and was named Abby. The storm moved west and turned to the northwest_{,} while reducing its forward movement on December 3. The JTWC predicted intensification as the storm moved towards Guam. However, Abby weakened to a tropical depression on the 6th as it moved west of Truk. On December 7, Abby reintensified into a weak tropical storm. On the 8th, Abby weakened once again to a tropical depression and accelerated forward. By December 9, aircraft reconnaissance indicated that Abby had two centers of circulation. On the 10th, Abby attained typhoon strength which made it the last typhoon of 1979. On the next day, Abby recurved in response to a mid-tropospheric short-wave trough. Typhoon Abby reached maximum intensity of 125 mph (201 km/h) with a minimum pressure of 951 mb on December 13. As Abby continued to move east-northeast, it rapidly weakened due to strong westerlies. Typhoon Abby then dissipated on December 14 due to strong shear.

=== Tropical Storm Ben (Krising) ===
- Tropical storm (JMA)
- Tropical storm (SSHWS)
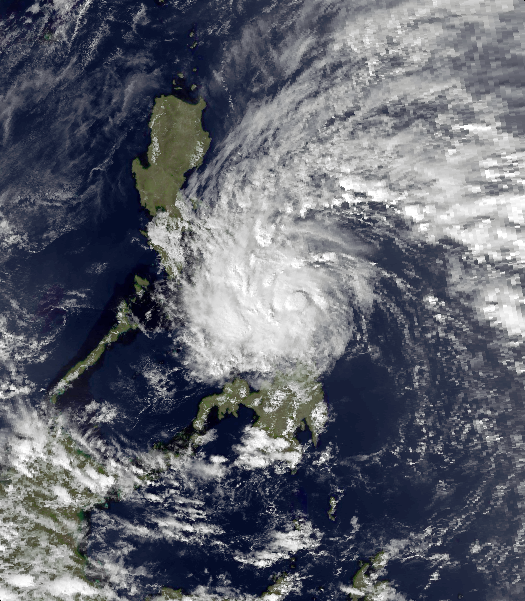
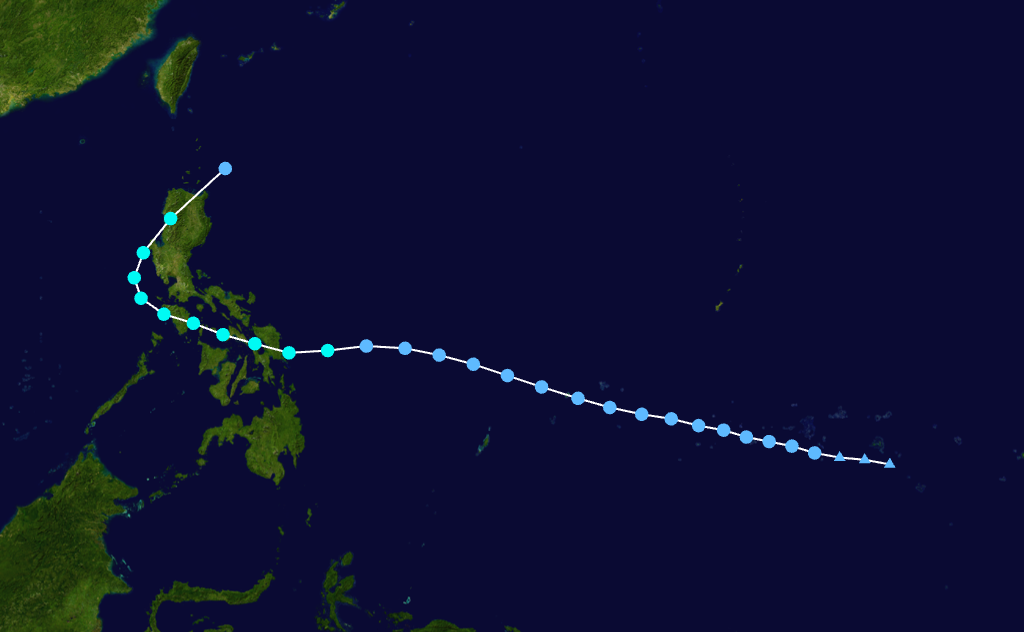
- Duration: December 20 – December 23
- Peak intensity: 85 km/h (50 mph) (10-min); 994 hPa (mbar)

A tropical depression developed on December 20. Later that day, the depression was upgraded to a tropical storm. Ben then reached its peak intensity on December 22 with winds of 70 mph (110 km/h).) The storm was downgraded to a tropical depression on the 23rd and dissipated later that day. Ben was the last tropical cyclone of the 1979 Pacific typhoon season.

== Storm names ==
=== International ===
During the season 23 named tropical cyclones developed in the Western Pacific and were named by the Joint Typhoon Warning Center, when it was determined that they had become tropical storms. These names were contributed to a revised list starting this year, which now includes both female and male names.

Alice	Bess	Cecil	Dot	Ellis	Faye	Gordon	Hope	Irving	Judy	Ken	Lola
Mac	Nancy	Owen	Pamela	Roger	Sarah	Tip	Vera	Wayne	Abby	Ben	

=== Philippines ===
Auring	Bebeng	Karing	Diding	Etang
Gening	Herming	Ising	Luding	Mameng
Neneng	Oniang	Pepang	Rosing	Sisang
Trining	Uring	Warling	Yayang	
Auxiliary list
				Ading
Barang	Krising	Dadang (unused)	Erling (unused)	Goying (unused)

The Philippine Atmospheric, Geophysical and Astronomical Services Administration uses its own naming scheme for tropical cyclones in their area of responsibility. PAGASA assigns names to tropical depressions that form within their area of responsibility and any tropical cyclone that might move into their area of responsibility. Should the list of names for a given year prove to be insufficient, names are taken from an auxiliary list, the first 6 of which are published each year before the season starts. Names not retired from this list will be used again in the 1983 season. This is the same list used for the 1975 season. PAGASA uses its own naming scheme that starts in the Filipino alphabet, with names of Filipino female names ending with "ng" (A, B, K, D, etc.). Names that were not assigned/going to use are marked in gray.

== Season effects ==
This is a table of all of the storms that have formed in the 1979 Pacific typhoon season. It includes their duration, names, affected areas, damages, and death totals. Deaths in parentheses are additional and indirect (an example of an indirect death would be a traffic accident), but were still related to that storm. Damage and deaths include totals while the storm was extratropical, a wave, or a low, and all of the damage figures are in 1979 USD. Names listed in parentheses were assigned by PAGASA.

Name	Dates	Peak intensity			Areas affected	Damage (USD)	Deaths	Ref(s).
Name	Dates	Category	Wind speed	Pressure	Areas affected	Damage (USD)	Deaths	Ref(s).
Alice	December 31– January 15	Very strong typhoon	175 km/h (109 mph)	930 hPa (27.46 inHg)	Marshall Islands, Guam	$500,000	None	
Bess (Auring)	March 19–25	Typhoon	130 km/h (81 mph)	955 hPa (28.20 inHg)	None	None	None	
Cecil (Bebeng)	April 11–20	Typhoon	140 km/h (87 mph)	965 hPa (28.50 inHg)	Philippines	$36.2 million	30	
Dot (Karing)	May 9–17	Tropical storm	75 km/h (47 mph)	985 hPa (29.09 inHg)	Philippines	None	None	
Diding	May 19–24	Tropical storm	75 km/h (47 mph)	992 hPa (29.29 inHg)	Parcel Islands, Taiwan	None	None	
TD	May 19–20	Tropical depression	Not specified	1006 hPa (29.71 inHg)	None	None	None	
TD	June 15–25	Tropical depression	Not specified	1000 hPa (29.53 inHg)	None	None	None	
Ellis (Etang)	June 28 – July 7	Typhoon	140 km/h (87 mph)	955 hPa (28.20 inHg)	Philippines, Hong Kong	$14,000	None	
Faye (Gening)	July 1–9	Severe tropical storm	100 km/h (62 mph)	990 hPa (29.23 inHg)	None	None	None	
TD	July 23–27	Tropical depression	Not specified	1002 hPa (29.59 inHg)	None	None	None	
Gordon (Herming)	July 25–31	Severe tropical storm	100 km/h (62 mph)	975 hPa (28.79 inHg)	Taiwan, China	$400,000	None	
Hope (Ising)	July 25 – August 3	Violent typhoon	205 km/h (127 mph)	900 hPa (26.58 inHg)	Guam, Philippines, Taiwan, China, Hong Kong, Macao, Vietnam, Laos	$542,000	112	
Luding	August 3–6	Tropical depression	Not specified	998 hPa (29.47 inHg)	None	None	None	
TD	August 4–11	Tropical depression	Not specified	994 hPa (29.35 inHg)	None	None	None	
TD	August 6–11	Tropical depression	Not specified	1000 hPa (29.53 inHg)	None	None	None	
TD	August 6	Tropical depression	Not specified	1002 hPa (29.59 inHg)	None	None	None	
Irving (Mameng)	August 7–18	Typhoon	150 km/h (93 mph)	955 hPa (28.20 inHg)	South Korea, Russia	$16.1 million	174	
TD	August 8	Tropical depression	Not specified	1010 hPa (29.83 inHg)	None	None	None	
TD	August 8–9	Tropical depression	Not specified	998 hPa (29.47 inHg)	None	None	None	
TD	August 15–17	Tropical depression	Not specified	998 hPa (29.47 inHg)	None	None	None	
Judy (Neneng)	August 16–26	Violent typhoon	205 km/h (127 mph)	910 hPa (26.87 inHg)	China, South Korea, Japan	Unknown	111	
TD	August 16–17	Tropical depression	Not specified	998 hPa (29.47 inHg)	None	None	None	
TD	August 16–25	Tropical depression	Not specified	1004 hPa (29.65 inHg)	None	None	None	
TD	August 24–27	Tropical depression	Not specified	1008 hPa (29.77 inHg)	None	None	None	
TD	August 25–30	Tropical depression	Not specified	1004 hPa (29.65 inHg)	None	None	None	
TD	August 27–28	Tropical depression	Not specified	1008 hPa (29.77 inHg)	None	None	None	
TD	August 29	Tropical depression	Not specified	1008 hPa (29.77 inHg)	None	None	None	
Ken (Oniang)	August 30– September 4	Tropical storm	85 km/h (53 mph)	990 hPa (29.23 inHg)	Japan	$5.7 million	2	
TD	August 30–31	Tropical depression	Not specified	1006 hPa (29.71 inHg)	None	None	None	
Lola	September 1–8	Typhoon	150 km/h (93 mph)	950 hPa (28.05 inHg)	None	None	None	
TD	September 1	Tropical depression	Not specified	1008 hPa (29.77 inHg)	None	None	None	
Mac (Pepang)	September 12–24	Severe tropical storm	100 km/h (62 mph)	985 hPa (29.09 inHg)	Philippines, Luzon, Hong Kong	$9.76 million	8	
TD	September 13–16	Tropical depression	Not specified	1006 hPa (29.71 inHg)	None	None	None	
Nancy	September 15–23	Tropical storm	85 km/h (53 mph)	992 hPa (29.29 inHg)	Hainan, Vietnam	Unknown	Unknown	
TD	September 19–21	Tropical depression	Not specified	1008 hPa (29.77 inHg)	None	None	None	
Owen (Rosing)	September 21 – October 1	Very strong typhoon	165 km/h (103 mph)	920 hPa (27.17 inHg)	Guam, Japan	$490 million	12	
Pamela	September 25–26	Tropical storm	75 km/h (47 mph)	994 hPa (29.35 inHg)	None	None	None	
TD	September 29	Tropical depression	Not specified	1004 hPa (29.65 inHg)	None	None	None	
TD	September 30	Tropical depression	Not specified	1006 hPa (29.71 inHg)	None	None	None	
TD	September 30 – October 3	Tropical depression	Not specified	998 hPa (29.47 inHg)	None	None	None	
Sarah (Sisang-Uring)	October 1–17	Very strong typhoon	165 km/h (103 mph)	930 hPa (27.46 inHg)	Palawan Island, Philippines, Vietnam	$2.85 million	1	
TD	October 2–4	Tropical depression	Not specified	998 hPa (29.47 inHg)	None	None	None	
Roger (Trining)	October 3–7	Tropical storm	85 km/h (53 mph)	985 hPa (29.35 inHg)	Japan	None	None	
Tip (Warling)	October 4–19	Violent typhoon	260 km/h (160 mph)	870 hPa (25.69 inHg)	Caroline Islands, Philippines, Korean Peninsula, Japan, Northeast China, Russian Far East, Alaska	$484 million	111	
TD	October 5	Tropical depression	Not specified	1000 hPa (29.53 inHg)	None	None	None	
TD	October 17–21	Tropical depression	Not specified	1006 hPa (29.71 inHg)	None	None	None	
TD	October 22	Tropical depression	Not specified	1010 hPa (29.83 inHg)	None	None	None	
TD	October 22	Tropical depression	Not specified	1008 hPa (29.77 inHg)	None	None	None	
Vera (Yayang)	November 1–8	Violent typhoon	205 km/h (127 mph)	915 hPa (27.02 inHg)	Philippines	$610,000	6	
Wayne (Ading)	November 7–13	Severe tropical storm	95 km/h (59 mph)	990 hPa (29.23 inHg)	Philippines	None	None	
TD	November 14	Tropical depression	Not specified	1006 hPa (29.71 inHg)	None	None	None	
TD	November 20–21	Tropical depression	Not specified	1008 hPa (29.77 inHg)	None	None	None	
TD	November 29 – December 2	Tropical depression	Not specified	996 hPa (29.77 inHg)	None	None	None	
Abby (Barang)	December 1–14	Very strong typhoon	165 km/h (103 mph)	950 hPa (28.05 inHg)	None	None	None	
Ben (Krising)	December 20–23	Tropical storm	85 km/h (53 mph)	994 hPa (29.35 inHg)	Philippines	None	None	
Season aggregates
54 systems	March 19 – December 23, 1979		260 km/h (160 mph)	870 hPa (25.69 inHg)				

== See also ==
- Australian region cyclone seasons: 1978–79, 1979–80
- South Pacific cyclone seasons: 1978–79, 1979–80
- South-West Indian Ocean cyclone seasons 1978–79, 1979–80
- 1979 Atlantic hurricane season
- 1979 Pacific hurricane season
- Pacific typhoon climatology
- 1979 North Indian Ocean cyclone season

== Notes ==
1. These typhoon names are from the Joint Typhoon Warning Center (JTWC).
