= 1978–79 South Pacific cyclone season =

Tropical cyclone season

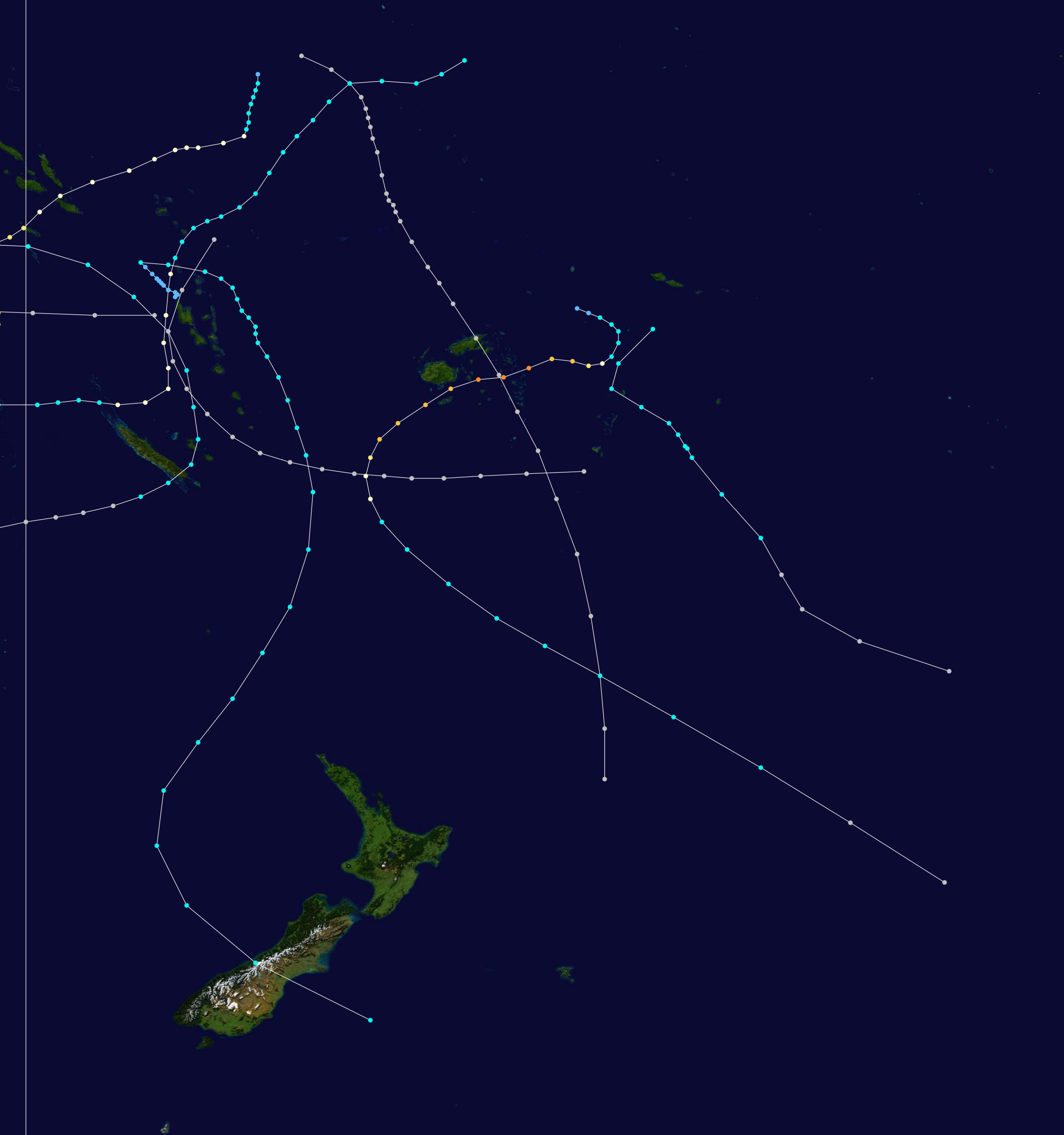
- Season summary map

Seasonal boundaries
- First system formed: December 27, 1978
- Last system dissipated: April 1, 1979

Strongest storm
- Name: Meli
  - Maximum winds: 155 km/h (100 mph) (10-minute sustained)
  - Lowest pressure: 945 hPa (mbar)

Seasonal statistics
- Total depressions: 8
- Tropical cyclones: 6 official, 2 unofficial
- Severe tropical cyclones: 3
- Total fatalities: 56
- Total damage: Unknown

Related articles
- 1978–79 South-West Indian Ocean cyclone season; 1978–79 Australian region cyclone season

The 1978–79 South Pacific cyclone season ran year-round from July 1 to June 30. Tropical cyclone activity in the Southern Hemisphere reaches its peak from mid-February to early March.

== Systems ==
=== Tropical Cyclone Fay ===
- Category 2 tropical cyclone (Australian scale)
- Tropical storm (SSHWS)
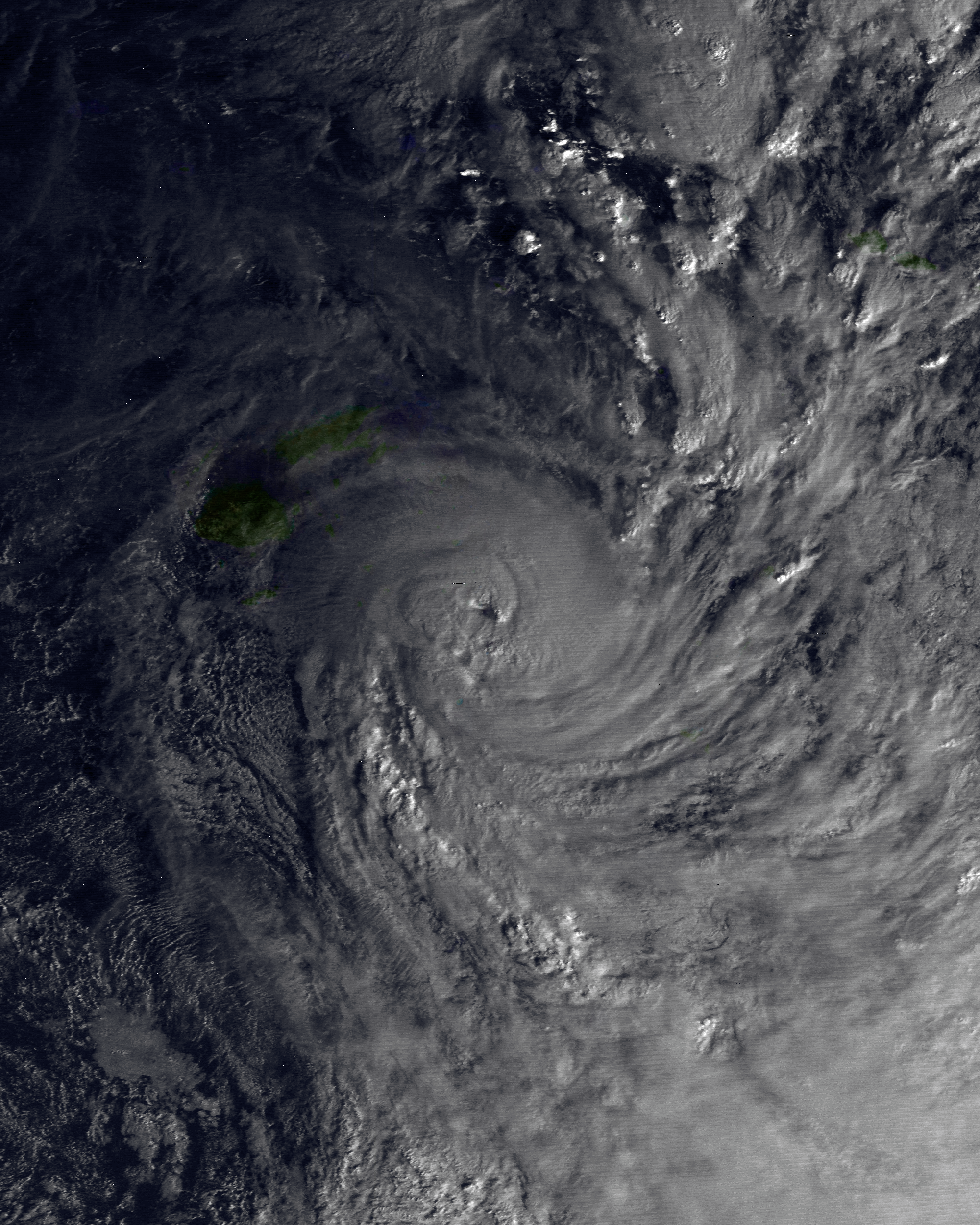
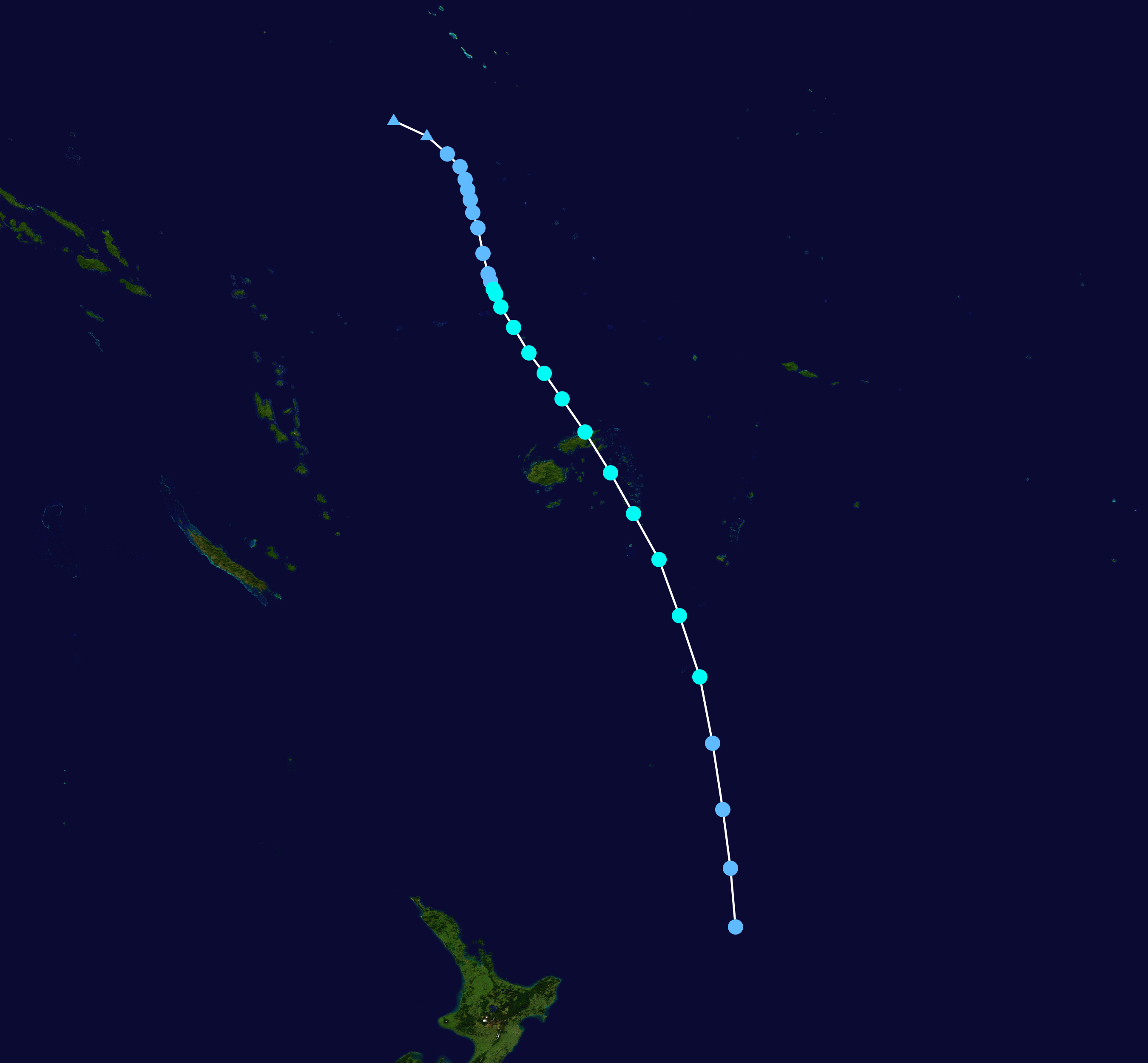
- Duration: December 27 – December 31
- Peak intensity: 100 km/h (65 mph) (10-min); 980 hPa (mbar)

The precursor to Tropical Cyclone Fay can be traced back to an area of disturbed weather about 400 mi (640 km) to the west of Tuvalu early on December 25. As it moved southeastward, it intensified into a tropical cyclone by the next day, before moving close to Rotuma by December 28 and reaching peak intensity the following day. The cyclone then moved through Fiji, where sustained winds were pushing at 60 kn (110 km/h; 69 mph) with hurricane-force wind gusts. Once through the islands, Fay accelerated southwards, and was last noted on December 31 as it was becoming extratropical northeast of New Zealand.

Weather stations at Undu Point and Savusavu recorded winds of 60 kn (110 km/h; 69 mph) as Fay passed through Fiji. Some of the Lau Islands suffered coastal damage from storm surge.

=== Severe Tropical Cyclone Gordon ===
- Category 3 severe tropical cyclone (Australian scale)
- Category 1 tropical cyclone (SSHWS)
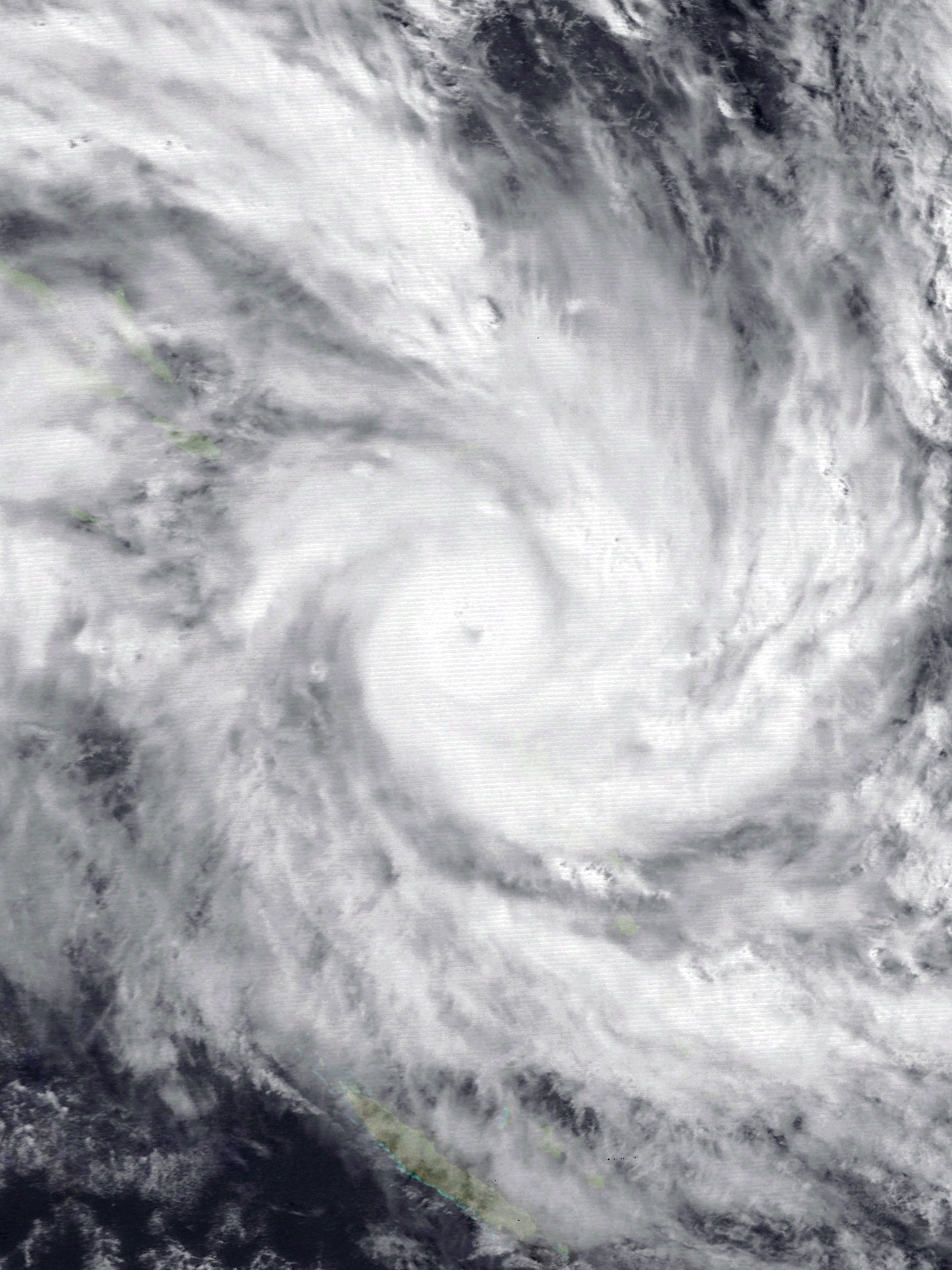
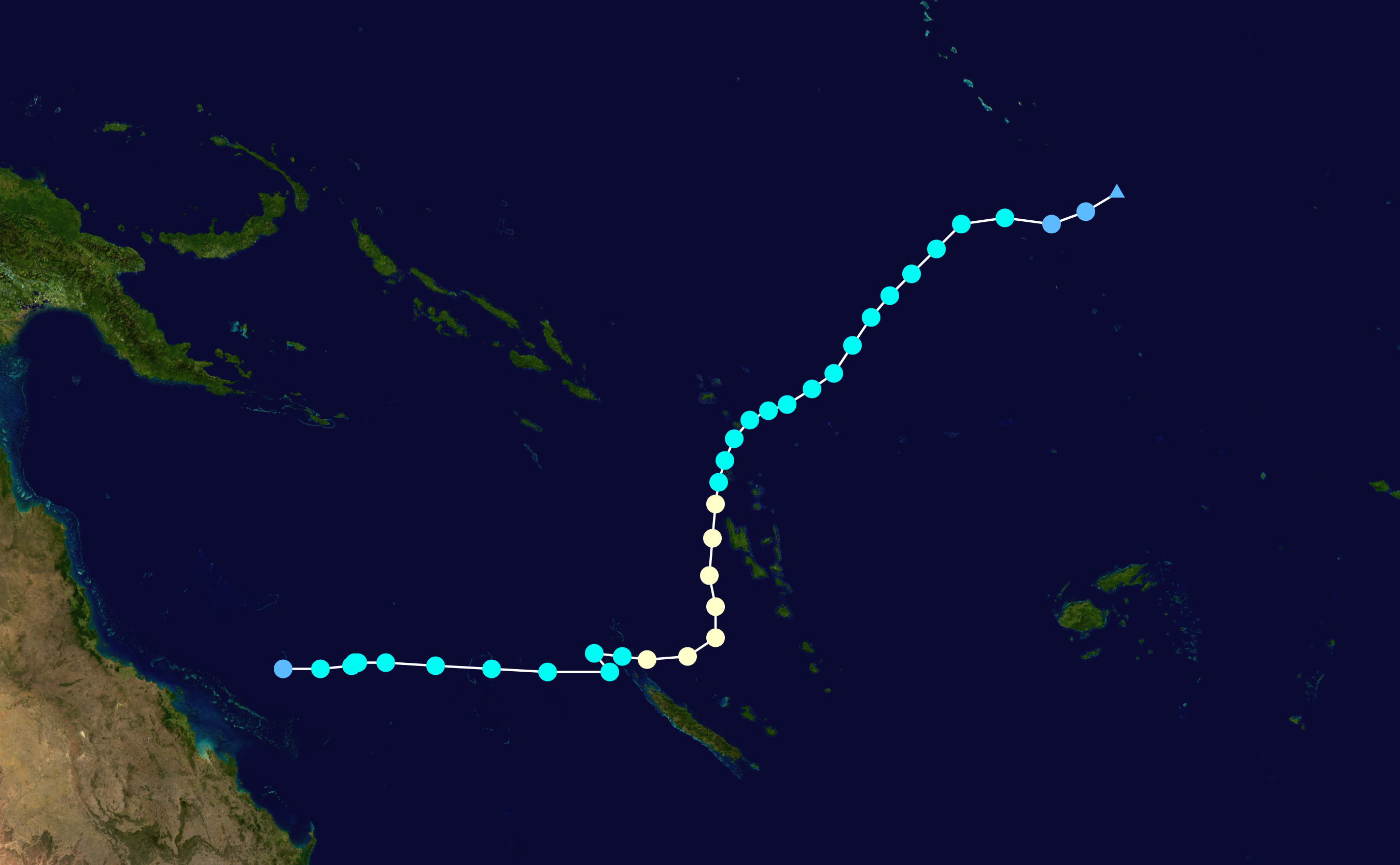
- Duration: January 3 – January 9 (Exited basin)
- Peak intensity: 130 km/h (80 mph) (10-min); 965 hPa (mbar)

Gordon was first tracked on January 3, when it was about 90 mi (140 km) to the north-northeast of the island of Tokelau. As it moved in a general southwestward direction, it strengthened into a tropical cyclone by the next day, before becoming a severe tropical cyclone by January 6. Then, it crossed to the north of Vanuatu with winds of 70 kn (130 km/h; 81 mph), before weakening into a tropical cyclone by January 7. It later approached New Caledonia while continuing to weaken on January 8, before it turned to the west, and subsequently exited the basin on January 9. Severe damage was reported in Vanuatu.

=== Tropical Cyclone Henry ===
- Category 2 tropical cyclone (Australian scale)
- Tropical storm (SSHWS)
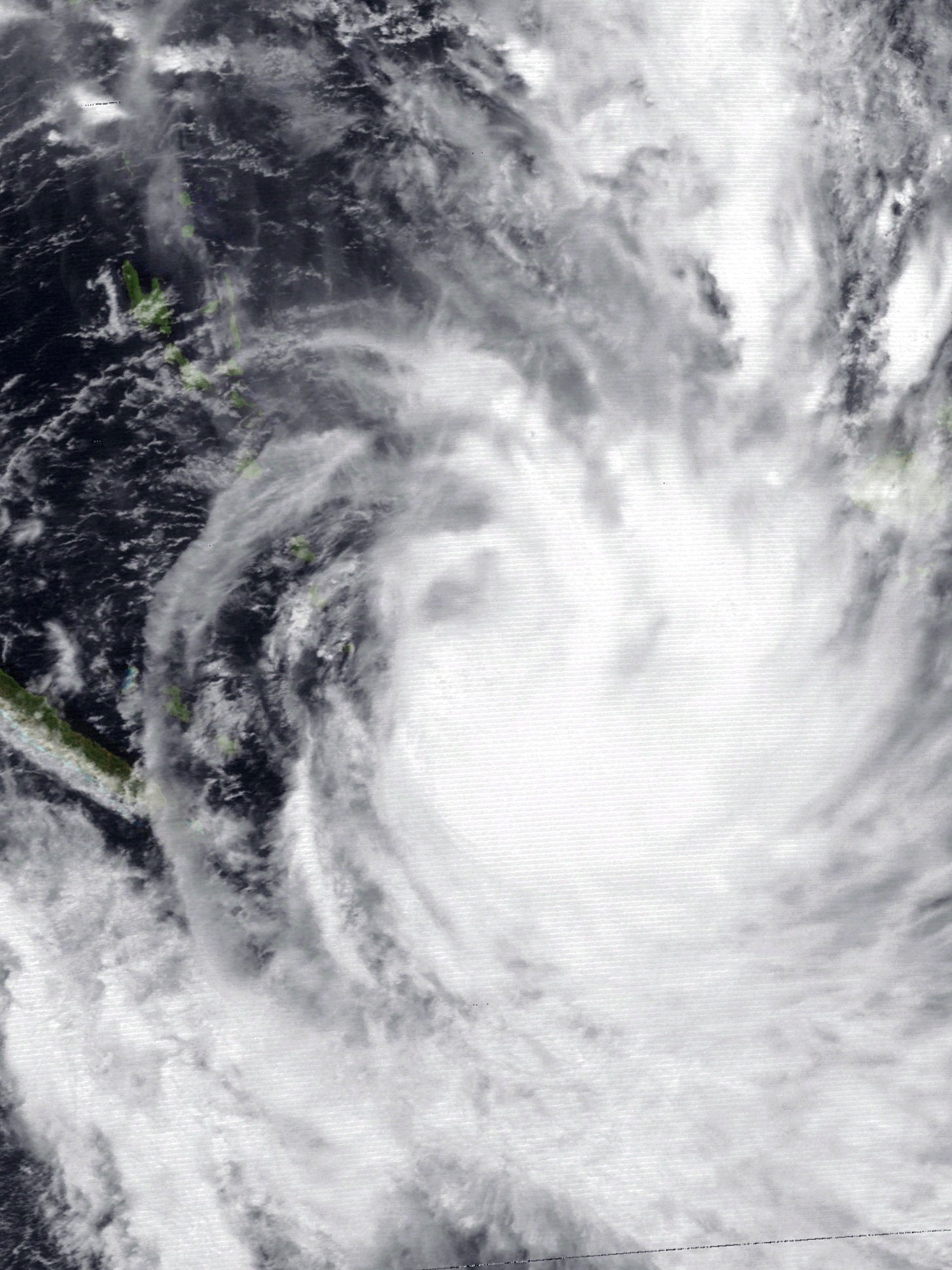
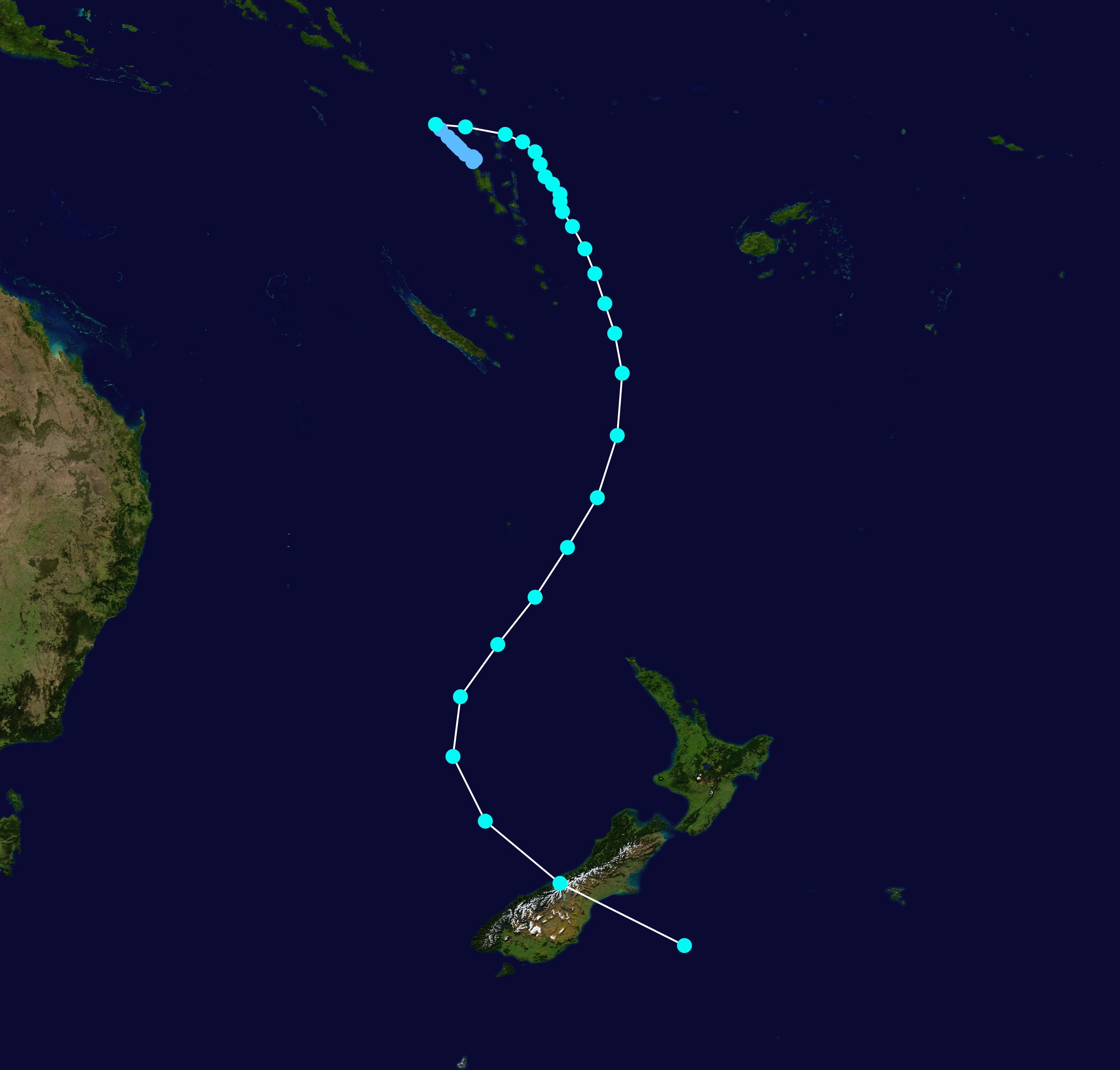
- Duration: January 29 – February 5
- Peak intensity: 100 km/h (65 mph) (10-min); 980 hPa (mbar)

Forming to the north of Vanuatu on January 29, Henry strengthened into a tropical cyclone on January 31, and took a southward track before becoming an extratropical cyclone and moving over New Zealand by February 4. It had little affect to land areas in Vanuatu.

=== Tropical Cyclone Judith ===
- Category 1 tropical cyclone (Australian scale)
- Tropical storm (SSHWS)
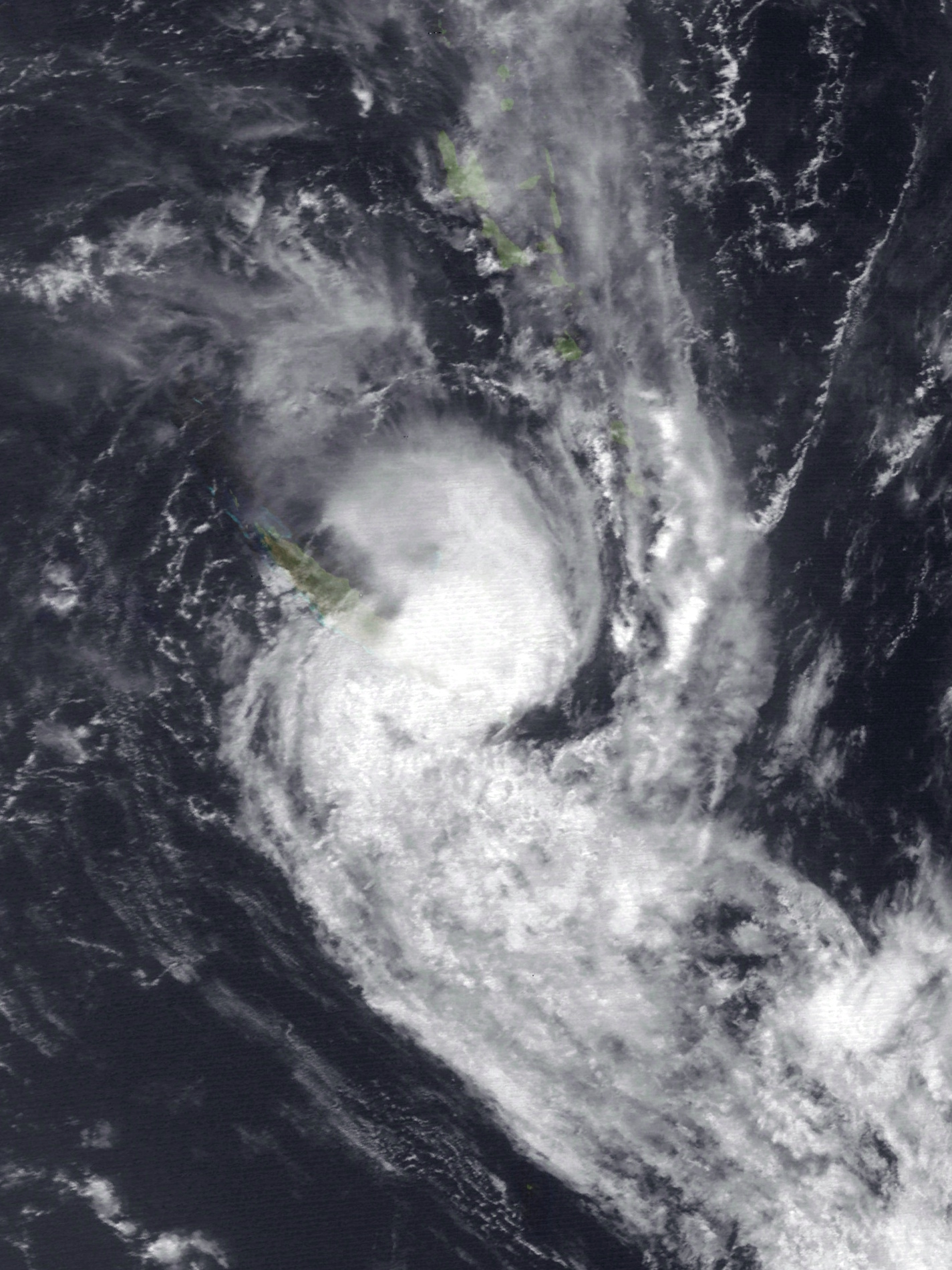
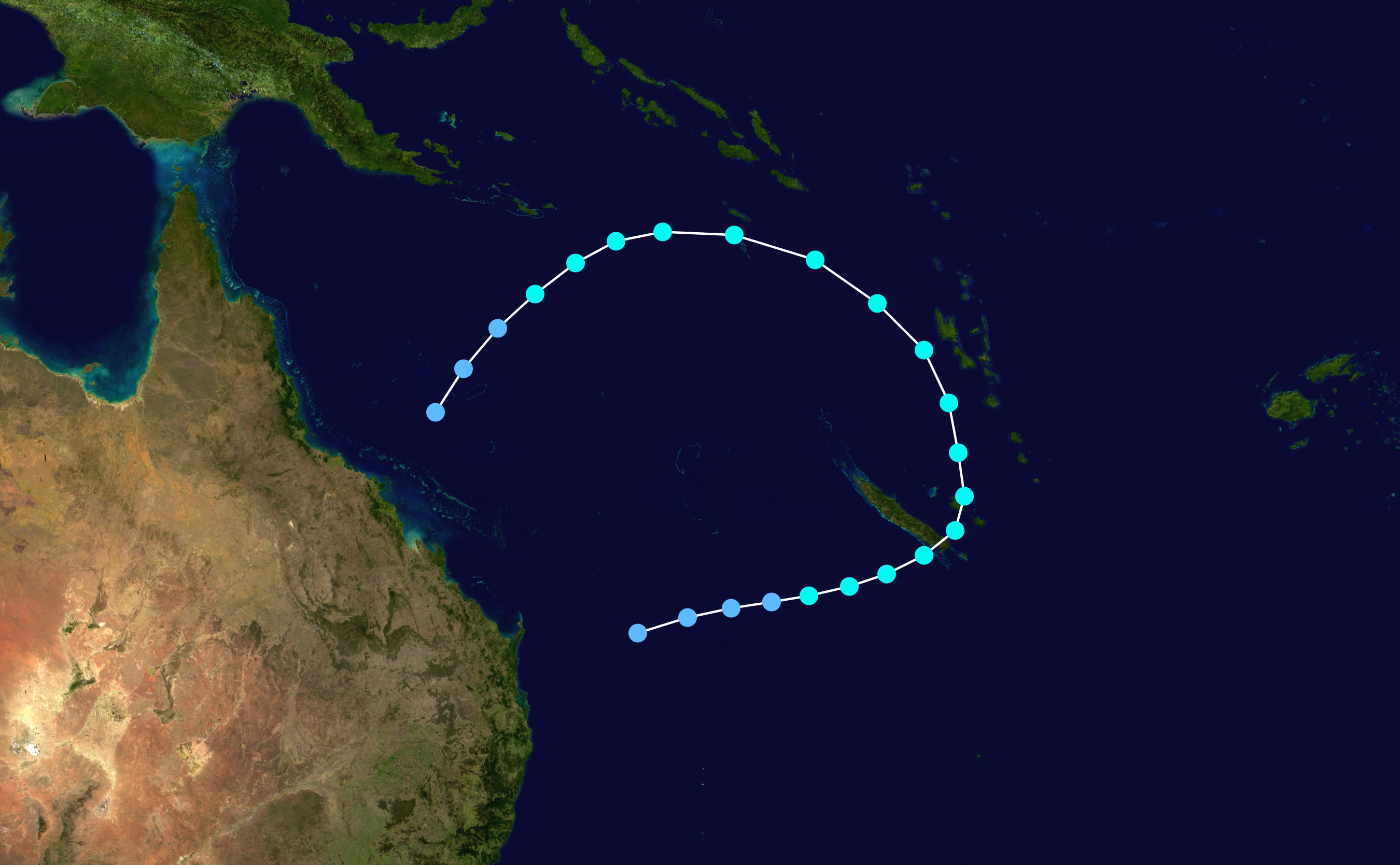
- Duration: February 3 – February 6
- Peak intensity: 75 km/h (45 mph) (10-min); 988 hPa (mbar)

Originating in the Australian region, Judith became a tropical cyclone as it moved close to Vanuatu, before turning west and re-entering the region by February 6. Like Henry, it also had little affect to land areas in Vanuatu.

=== Severe Tropical Cyclone Kerry ===
- Category 3 severe tropical cyclone (Australian scale)
- Category 2 tropical cyclone (SSHWS)
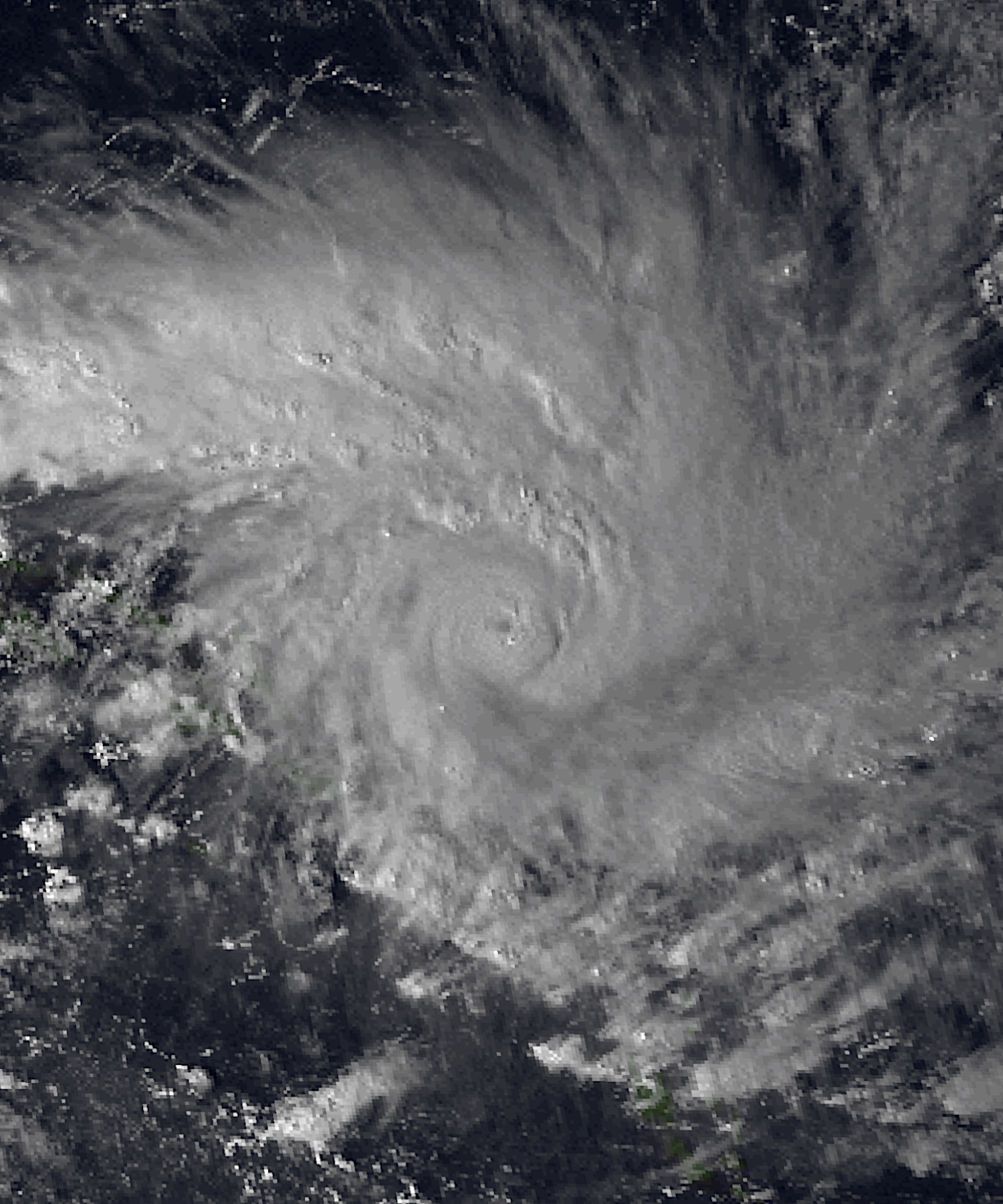
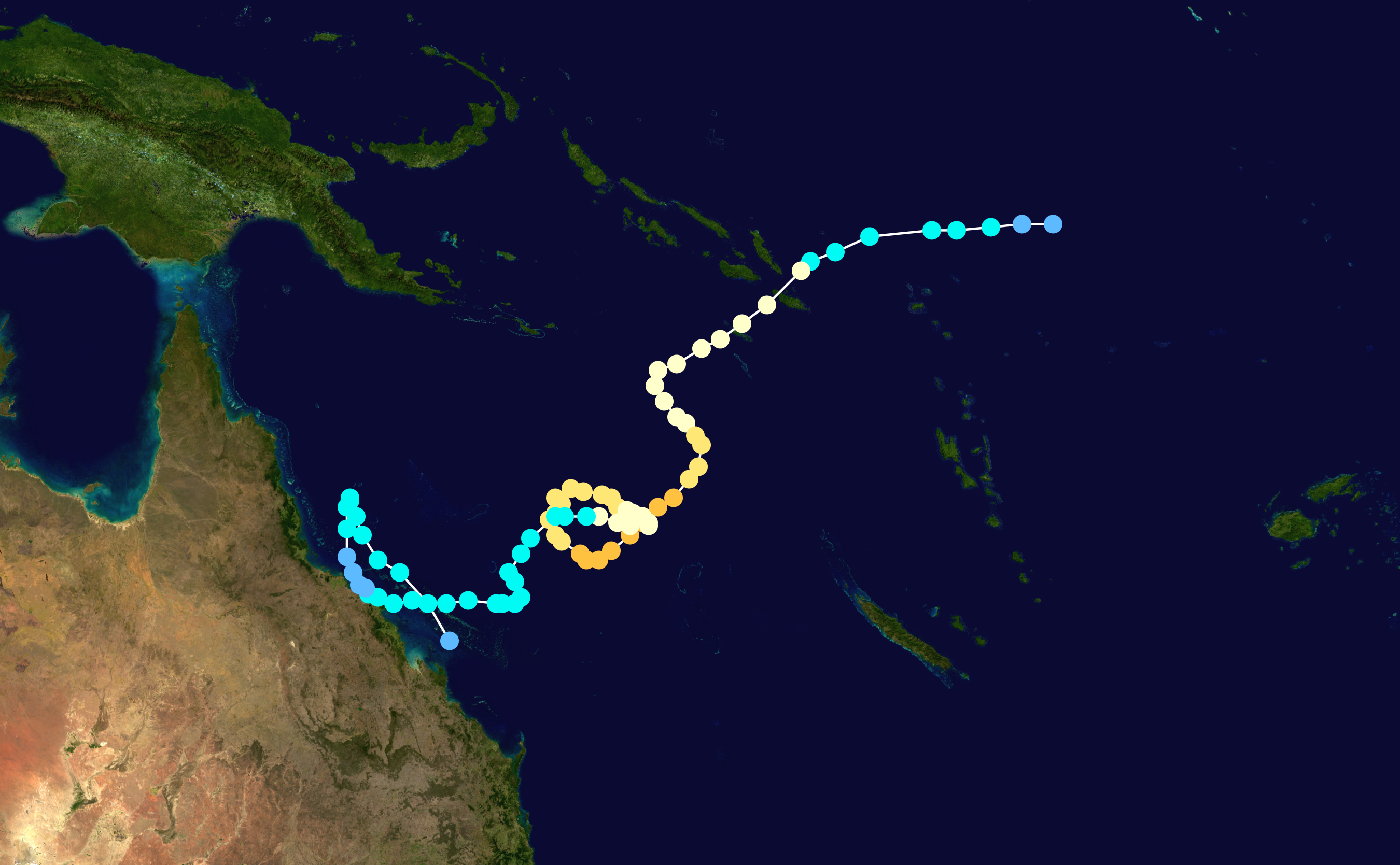
- Duration: February 13 – February 15 (Exited basin)
- Peak intensity: 140 km/h (85 mph) (10-min); 978 hPa (mbar)

Kerry's origins can be traced back to a low that became evident about 485 miles (781 km) to the southeast of Kiribati on February 7. By February 10, some cyclonic curvature could be detected in the surrounding convection, and by February 13, it had strengthened into a category 1 tropical cyclone. Moving generally west-southwest, it further strengthened into a category 2 tropical cyclone by 17:00 UTC on the same day, before fully becoming a severe tropical cyclone by February 14. As it moved closer near the Solomon Islands, it lashed Ulawa and neighboring islands, turning southwest and missing Makira and Guadalcanal, before skirting near Bellona. The cyclone then subsequently exited the basin and into the Australian region on February 15.

Severe damage was reported over the Solomon Islands, with monetary damages of SI$200 thousand. Over 22,000 people were homeless after the cyclone. 4 people were reported dead.

=== Tropical Cyclone Leslie ===
- Category 2 tropical cyclone (Australian scale)
- Tropical storm (SSHWS)
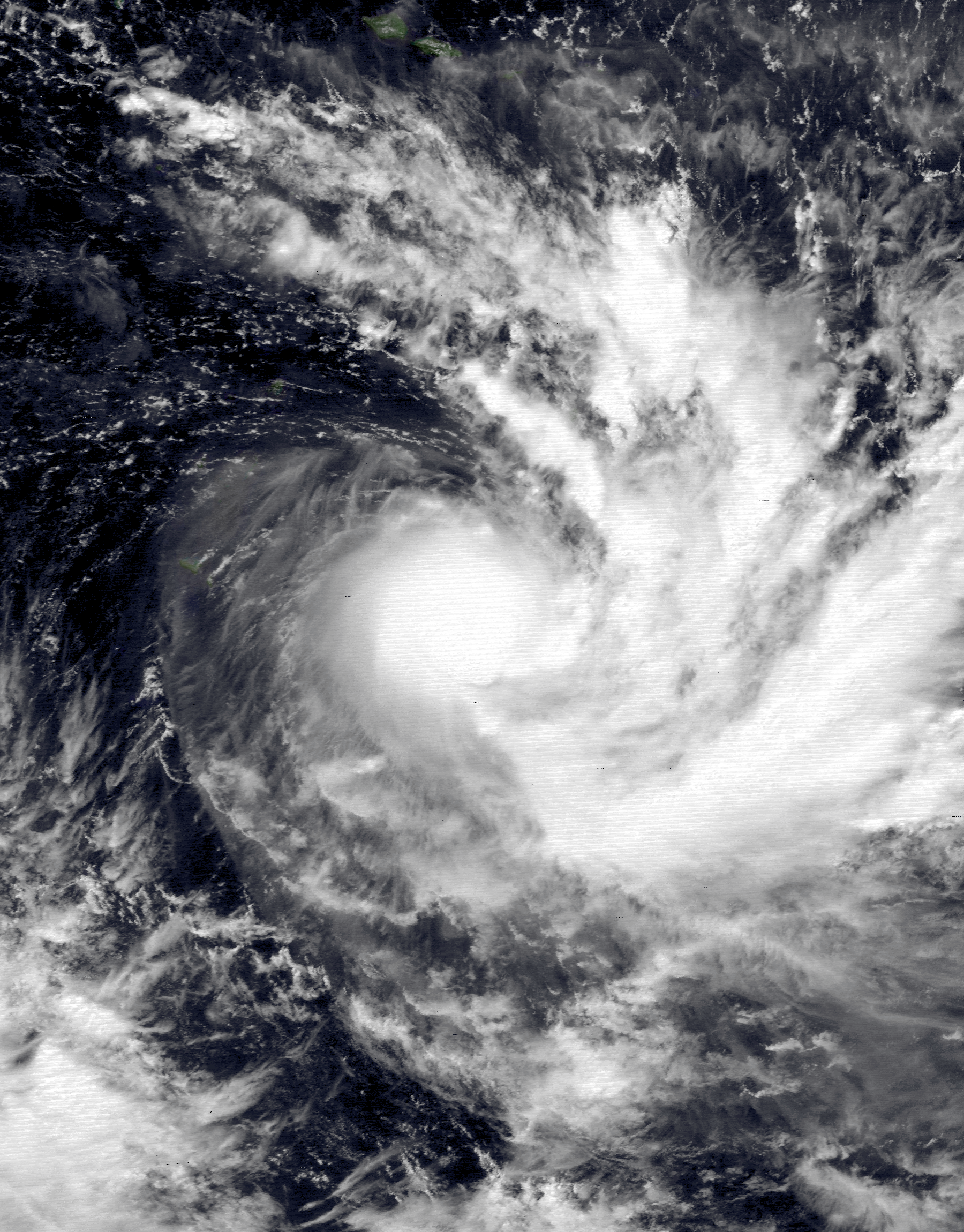
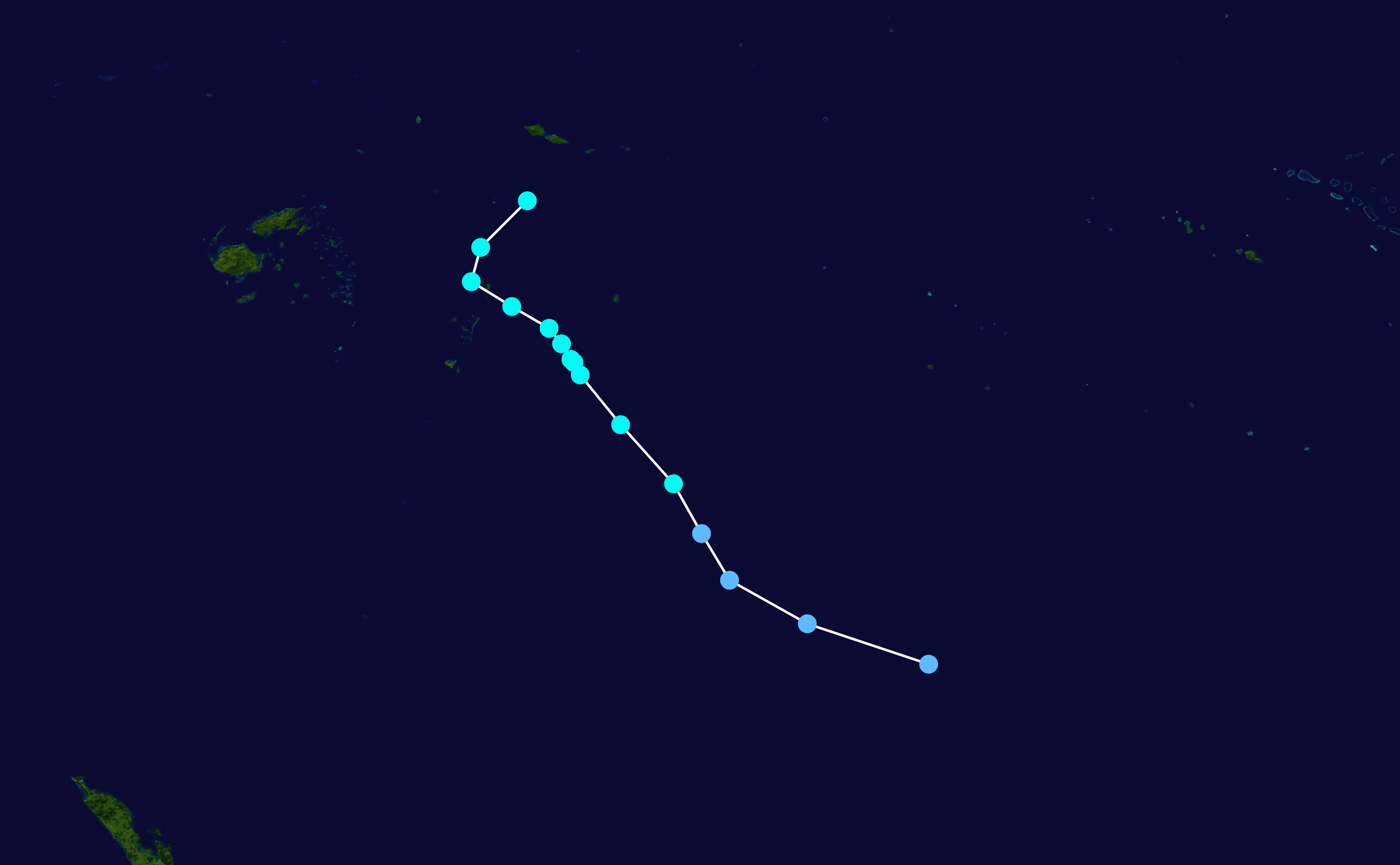
- Duration: February 21 – February 23
- Peak intensity: 100 km/h (65 mph) (10-min); 980 hPa (mbar)

Forming to the south of Samoa on February 21, Leslie intensified into a category 2 tropical cyclone while rapidly moving southeastward. After crossing the 30th parallel south, Leslie became extratropical. There were no reports of damage associated with the storm.

=== Severe Tropical Cyclone Meli ===
- Category 3 severe tropical cyclone (Australian scale)
- Category 4 tropical cyclone (SSHWS)
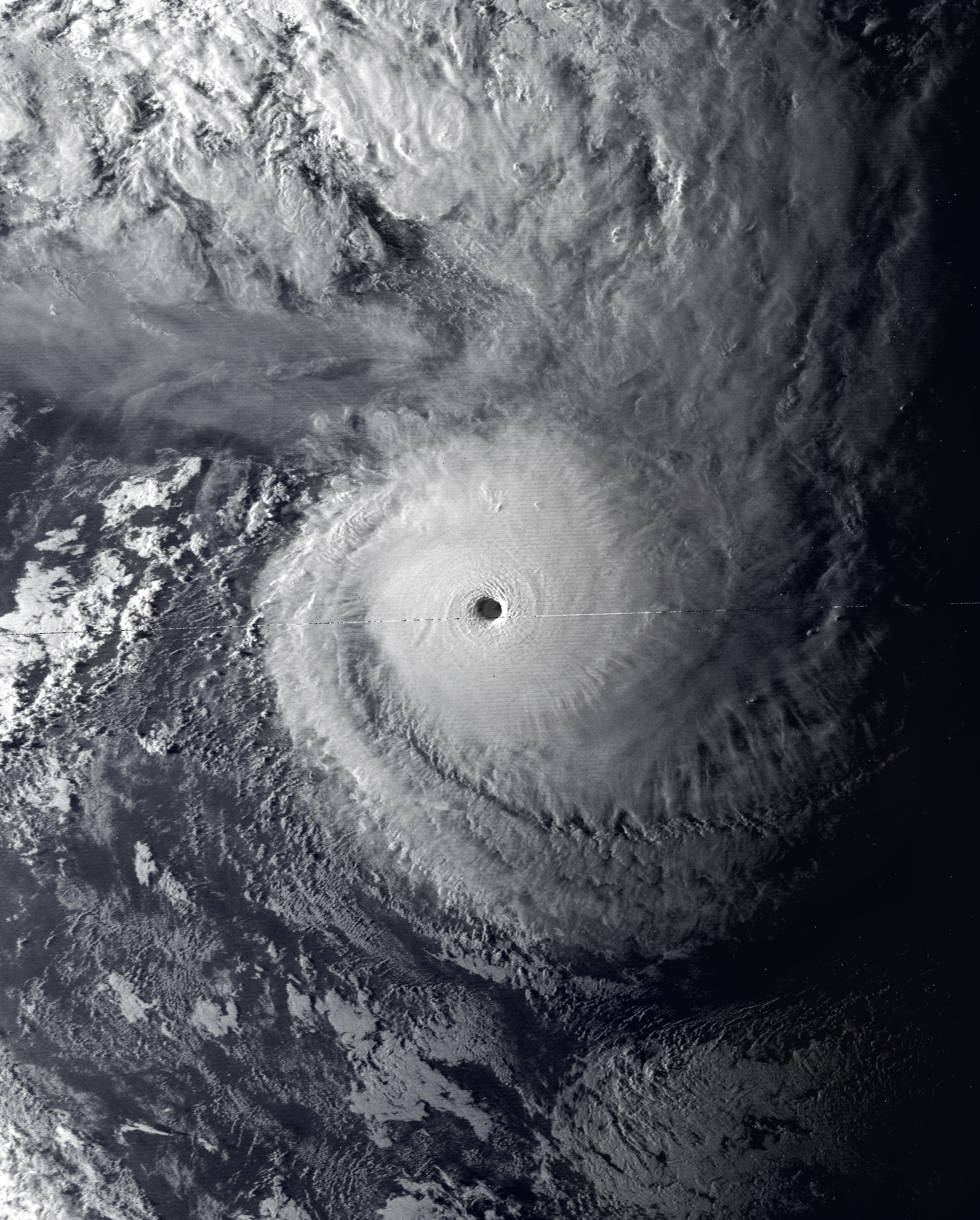
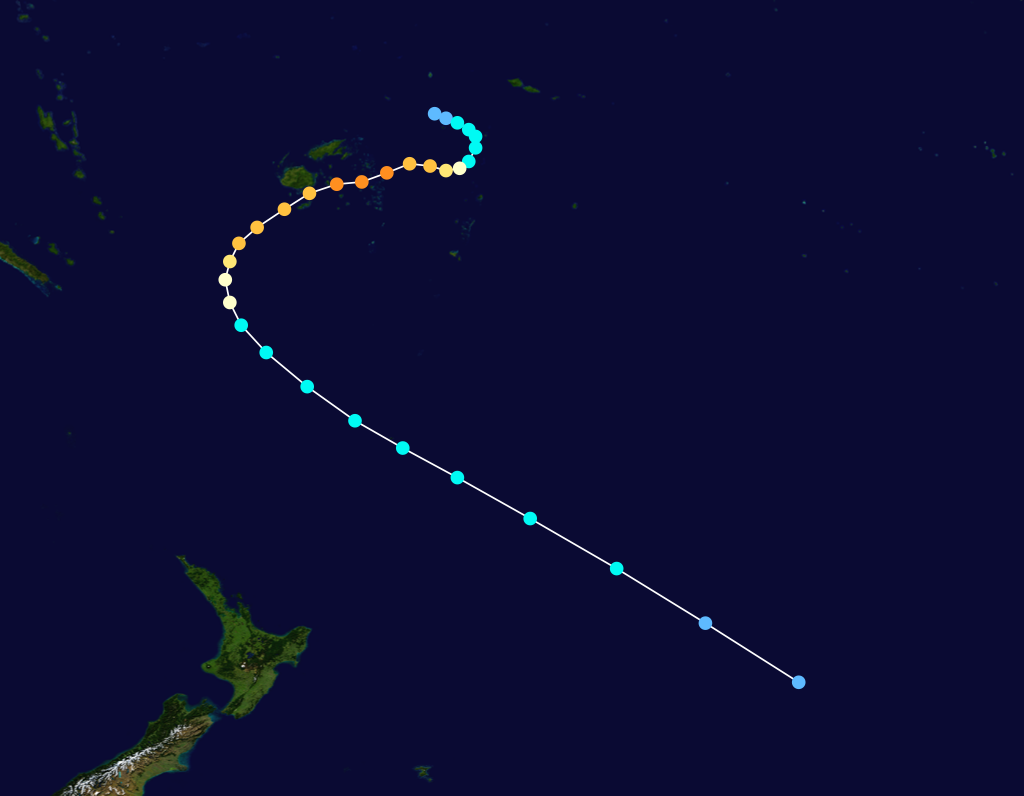
- Duration: March 24 – March 31
- Peak intensity: 155 km/h (100 mph) (10-min); 945 hPa (mbar)

Cyclone Meli first developed as a tropical depression between Fiji and Futuna on March 23. It moved east then southeast while it strengthened into a tropical cyclone, before turning to the west by March 26 as it developed an eye. It moved through Fiji throughout March 26 into 27, passing north of Lakeba and very close to Nayau, then passing very close to Suva at around 09:00 UTC on March 27. Once Meli cleared Fiji, it recurved to the southeast and weakened, and by March 30, Meli had reportedly weakened to a gale-force cyclone and was turning extratropical.

Meli had previously passed through Tuvalu, damaging Funafuti atoll. Meli then caused severe damage over the islands of Moala, Kadavu, Ono, and the central parts of the Lau Group. The island of Nayau suffered a direct hit from Meli. As a result, Fiji suffered tremendous crop losses. At least 11 ships were lost or damaged during the storm, with one of the ships being the Korean fishing vessel NAM HAE 202 with 20 crewmen onboard. A freighter also ran aground off the northwest coast of Vatulele after departing from Suva late on March 27 to ride out the storm. 52 people were killed by the storm, with 31 in Kadavu, and 14 in Nayau. A man and a young woman drowned after their yacht capsized under 90 kn (170 km/h; 100 mph) winds.

=== Tropical Cyclone Nina ===
- Category 1 tropical cyclone (Australian scale)
- Tropical storm (SSHWS)
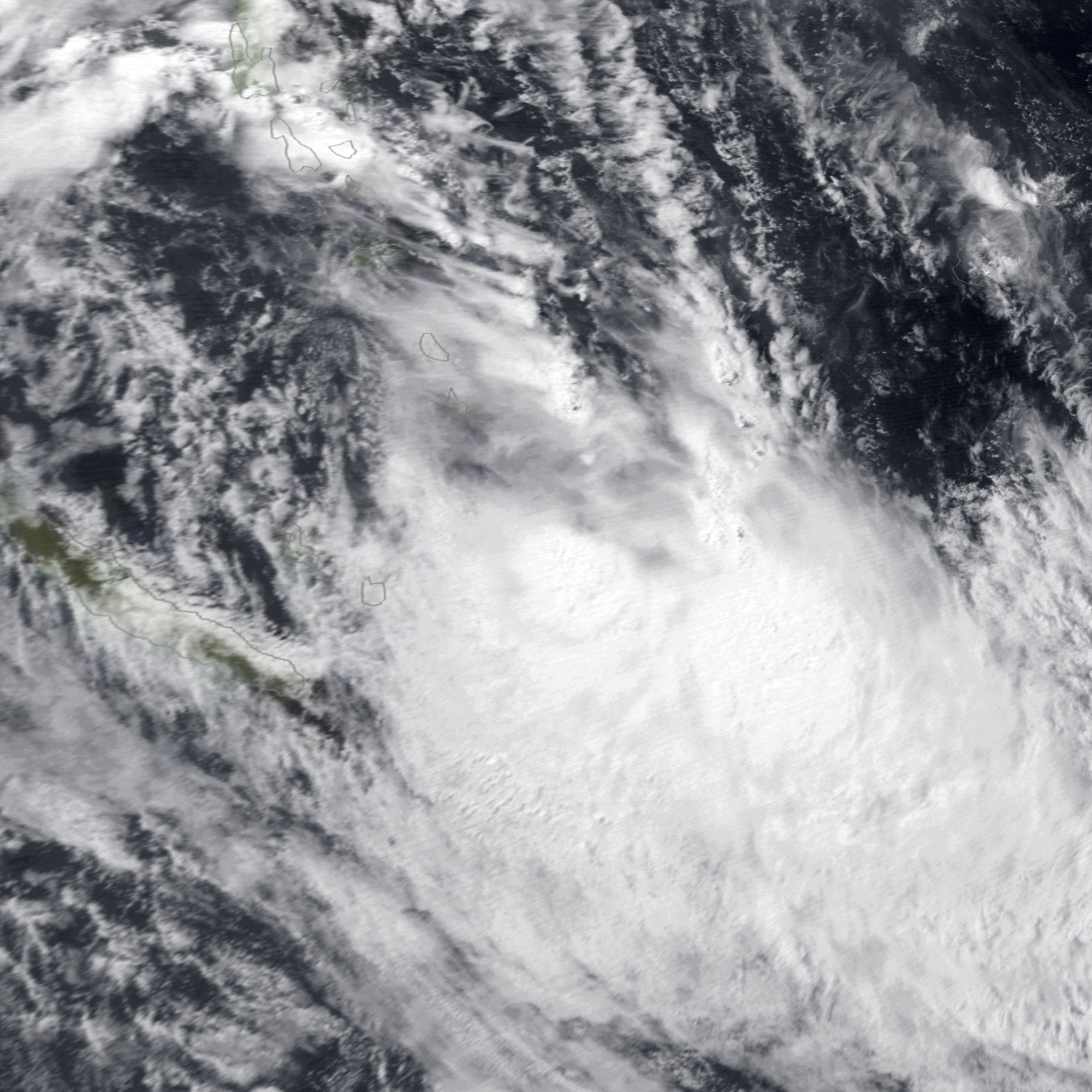
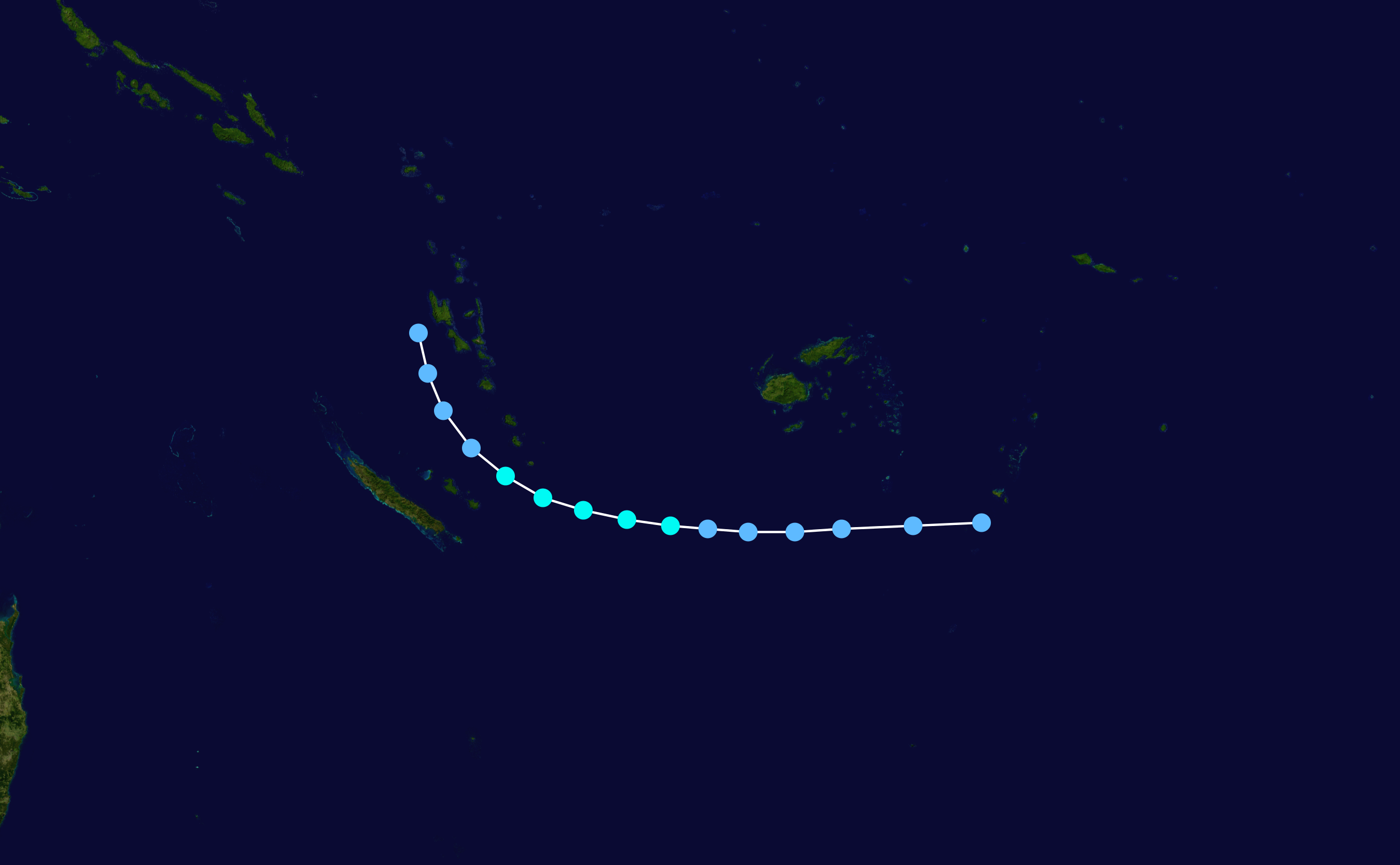
- Duration: March 30 – April 3
- Peak intensity: 75 km/h (45 mph) (10-min); 994 hPa (mbar)

Tropical Cyclone Nina formed near Vanuatu on March 31, and took a curving track to the southeast, dissipating near Tonga by April 3. There were no particular damage reports associated with the storm.

== Seasonal effects ==
Name	Dates	Peak intensity			Areas affected	Damage (USD)	Deaths	Ref(s).
Name	Dates	Category	Wind speed	Pressure	Areas affected	Damage (USD)	Deaths	Ref(s).
Fay	December 27 – 31	Category 2 tropical cyclone	100 km/h (65 mph)	980 hPa (28.94 inHg)	Fiji	Unknown	Unknown	
Gordon	January 3 – 9	Category 3 severe tropical cyclone	130 km/h (80 mph)	965 hPa (28.50 inHg)	Vanuatu, New Caledonia	Unknown	Unknown	
Henry	January 29 – February 5	Category 2 tropical cyclone	100 km/h (65 mph)	980 hPa (28.94 inHg)	Vanuatu, New Zealand	Unknown	Unknown	
Judith	February 3 – 6	Category 1 tropical cyclone	75 km/h (45 mph)	988 hPa (29.18 inHg)	Solomon Islands, Vanuatu, New Caledonia	Unknown	Unknown	
Kerry	February 13 – 15	Category 3 severe tropical cyclone	140 km/h (85 mph)	978 hPa (28.88 inHg)	Solomon Islands		4	
Leslie	February 21 – 23	Category 2 tropical cyclone	100 km/h (65 mph)	980 hPa (28.94 inHg)	Tonga	None	None	
Meli	March 24 – 30	Category 3 severe tropical cyclone	155 km/h (100 mph)	945 hPa (27.91 inHg)	Tuvalu, Samoa, American Samoa, Fiji	Unknown	52	
Nina	March 30 – April 1	Category 1 tropical cyclone	75 km/h (45 mph)	994 hPa (29.35 inHg)	Vanuatu, New Caledonia, Tonga	None	None	
Season aggregates
8 systems	December 27, 1978 – April 1, 1979		155 km/h (100 mph)	945 hPa (27.91 inHg)			56	

== See also ==
- Tropical cyclones in 1978
- Atlantic hurricane seasons: 1978, 1979
- Eastern Pacific hurricane seasons: 1978, 1979
- Western Pacific typhoon seasons: 1978, 1979
- North Indian Ocean cyclone seasons: 1978, 1979
