= 1978–79 South-West Indian Ocean cyclone season =

Cyclone season in the Southwest Indian Ocean

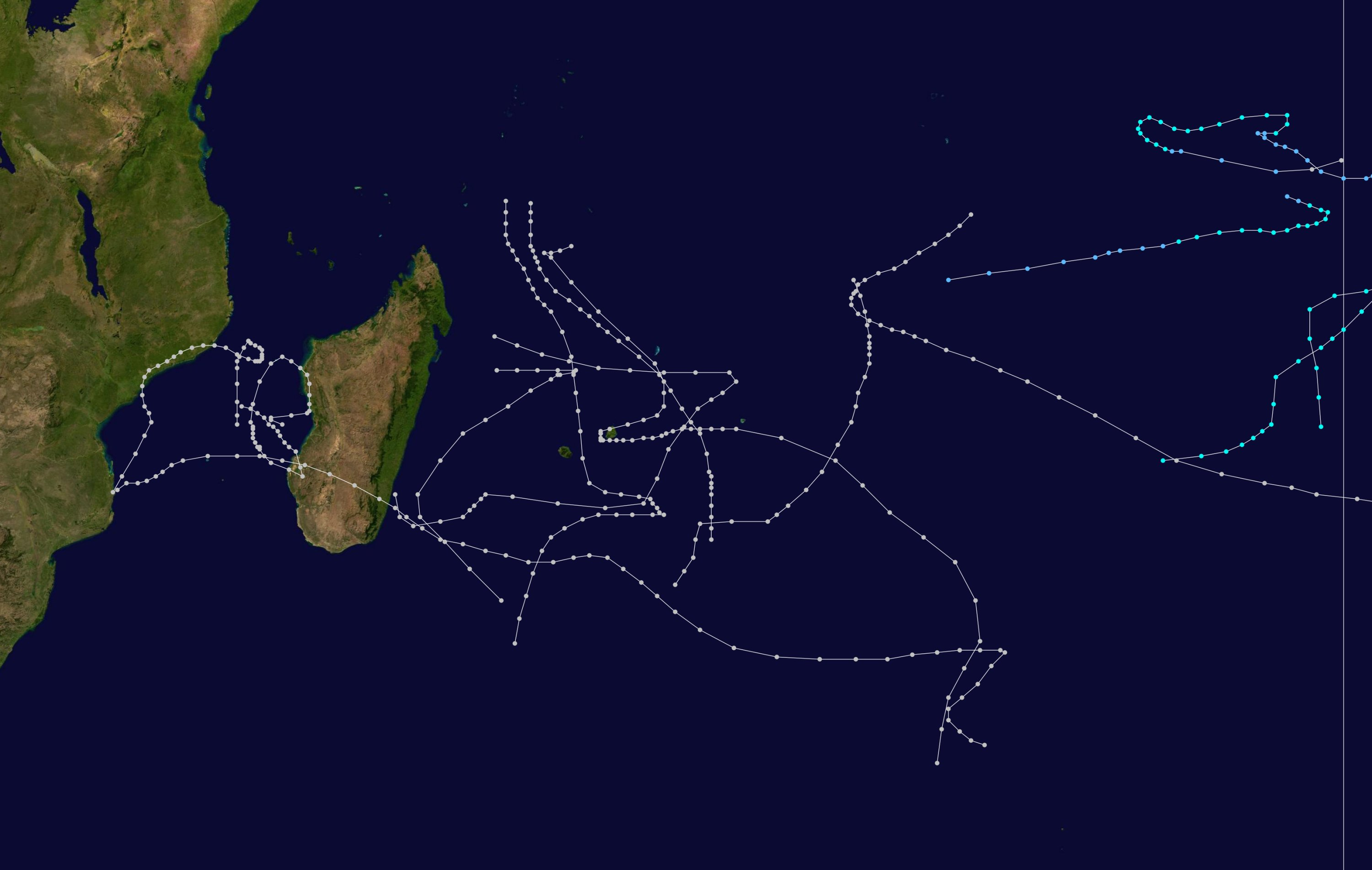
- Season summary map

Seasonal boundaries
- First system formed: November 19, 1978
- Last system dissipated: April 13, 1979

Strongest storm
- Name: Celine and Idylle
  - Maximum winds: 165 km/h (105 mph) (10-minute sustained)
  - Lowest pressure: 927 hPa (mbar)

Seasonal statistics
- Total depressions: 10
- Total storms: 6
- Tropical cyclones: 4
- Intense tropical cyclones: 2
- Total fatalities: 74
- Total damage: Unknown

Related articles
- 1978–79 Australian region cyclone season; 1978–79 South Pacific cyclone season

The 1978–79 South-West Indian Ocean cyclone season was an average cyclone season. The season officially ran from November 1, 1978, to April 30, 1979.

== Systems ==
=== Tropical Cyclone Angele ===
- Tropical cyclone (MFR)
- Category 3 tropical cyclone (SSHWS)
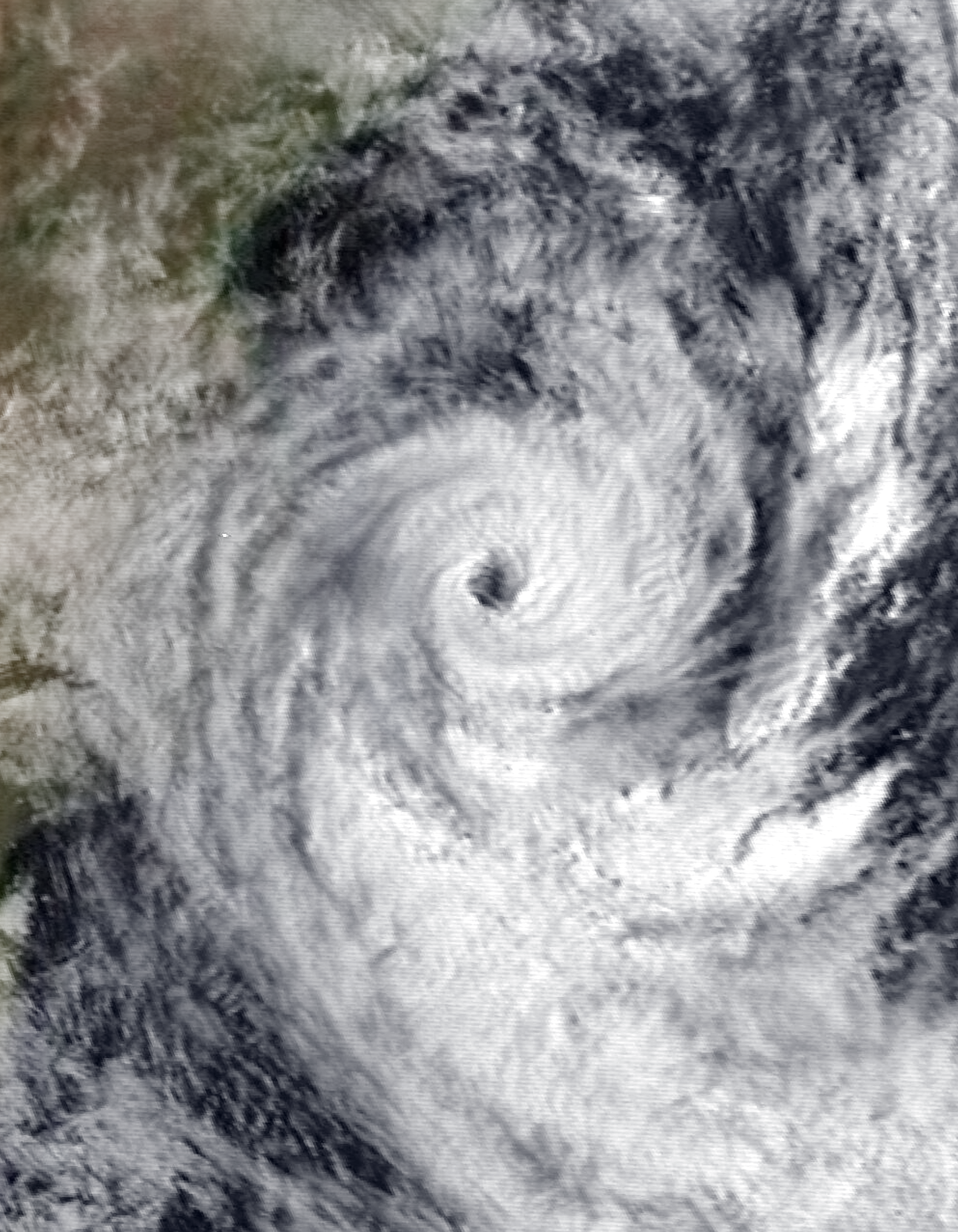
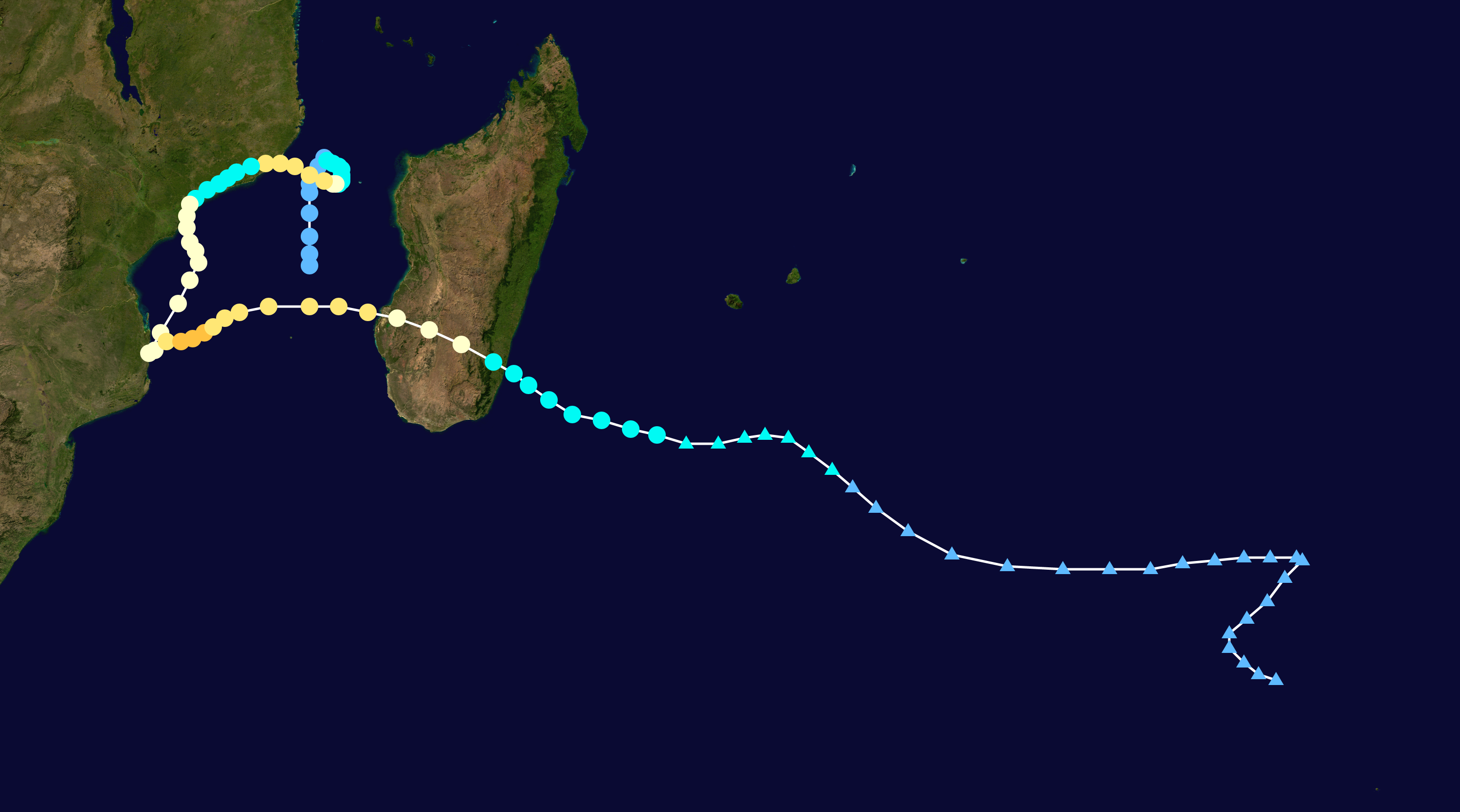
- Duration: December 13 – December 29
- Peak intensity: 150 km/h (95 mph) (10-min); 941 hPa (mbar)

Angele form on December 13, while stationed in the middle of the Mozambique Channel. It traveled north and gradually organized into a tropical storm while performing a tight counter-clockwise loop. On December 18 Angele intensified into a tropical cyclone before making landfall on Mozambique. Angele weakened to a tropical storm while over land, but re-intensified back to a tropical cyclone as it re-emerged into the Mozambique channel. The cyclone moved south and quite abruptly, on December 23, moved to the northeast. On December 24 Angele reached a peak intensity as a category three cyclone. The system weakened slightly before making landfall on Madagascar two days later. The weak storm moved over the open Indian Ocean and translated into an extra-tropical storm.

Angele is responsible for four deaths and 2,500 people homeless in Mozambique. In Madagascar 70 people were killed by the storm's passage.

=== Tropical Storm 03S ===
- Tropical storm (SSHWS)
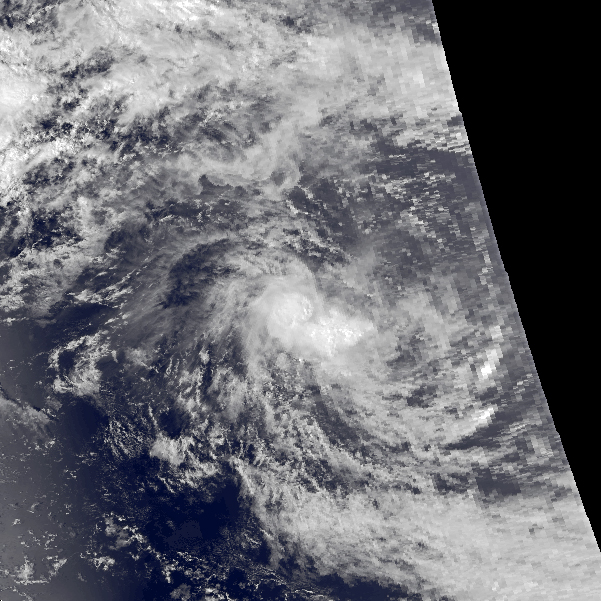
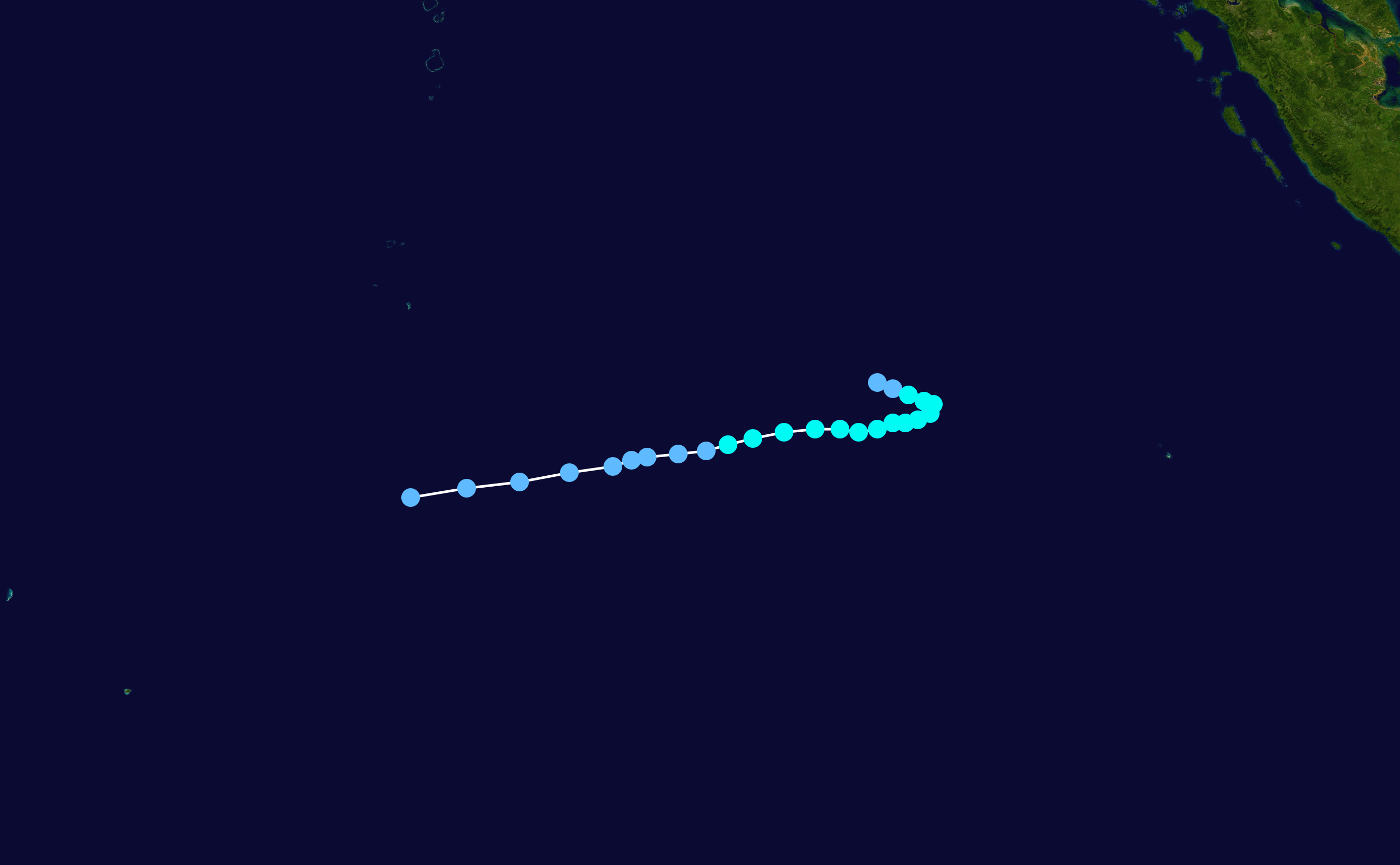
- Duration: December 24 (Entered basin) – December 26
- Peak intensity: 100 km/h (65 mph) (1-min);

03S entered the basin on December 24 and lasted until December 26.

=== Tropical Cyclone Benjamine ===
- Tropical cyclone (MFR)
- Category 3 tropical cyclone (SSHWS)
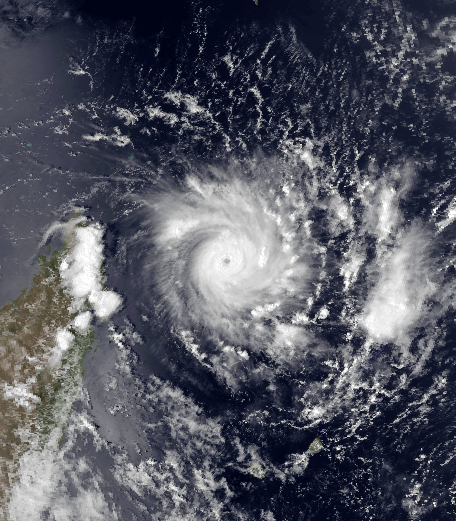
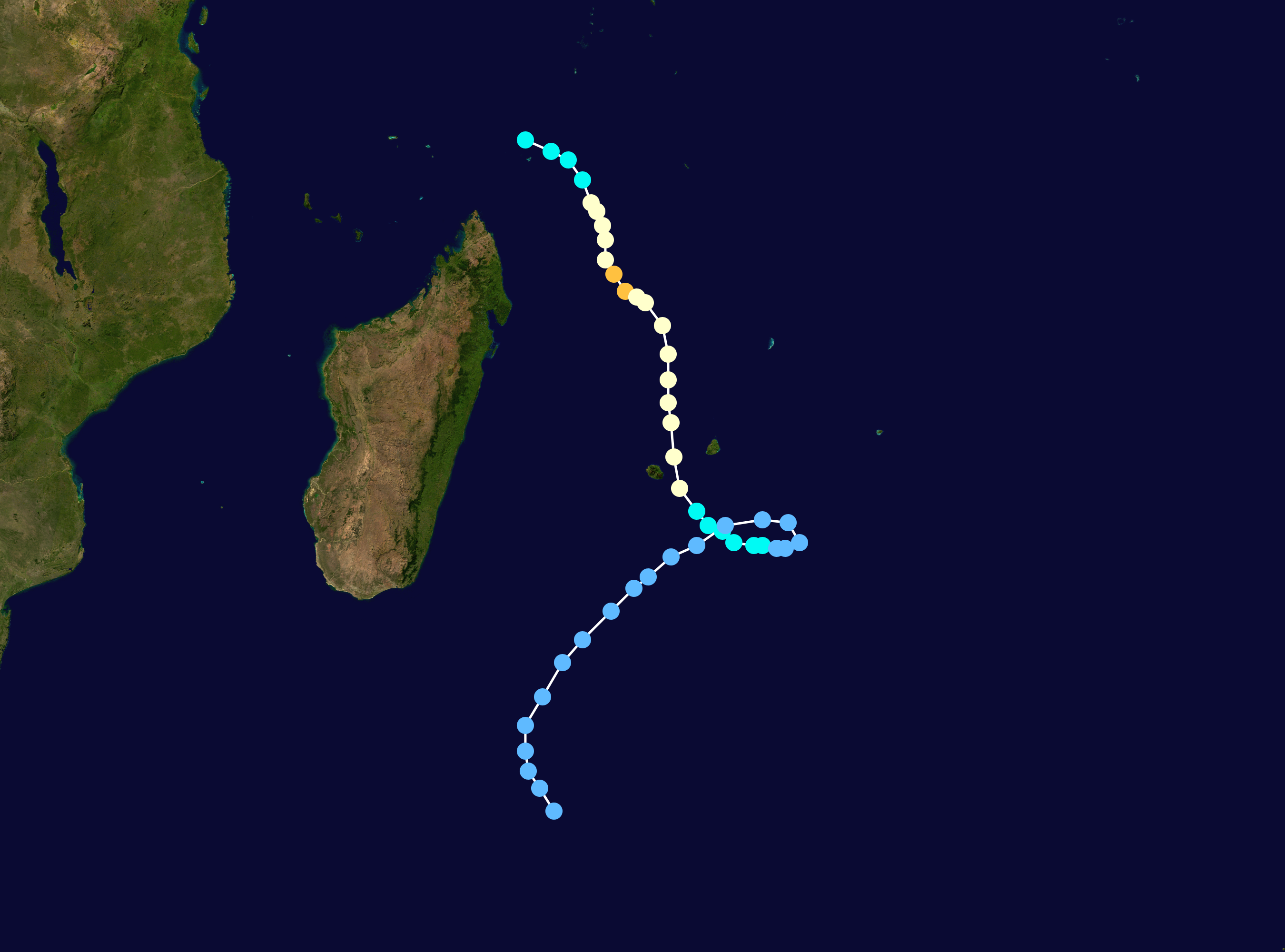
- Duration: January 3 – January 14
- Peak intensity: 150 km/h (95 mph) (10-min); 941 hPa (mbar)

Benjamine existed from January 3 to January 14. On January 7, the cyclone passed between Réunion and Mauritius. On the former island, the storm dropped heavy rainfall, reaching 665 mm (26.2 in) at Gite de Bellecombe, along with 126 km/h (78 mph) wind gusts at St. Denis. The storm damaged or destroyed 194 houses, while also damaging crops and power lines.

=== Intense Tropical Cyclone Celine ===
- Intense tropical cyclone (MFR)
- Category 4 tropical cyclone (SSHWS)
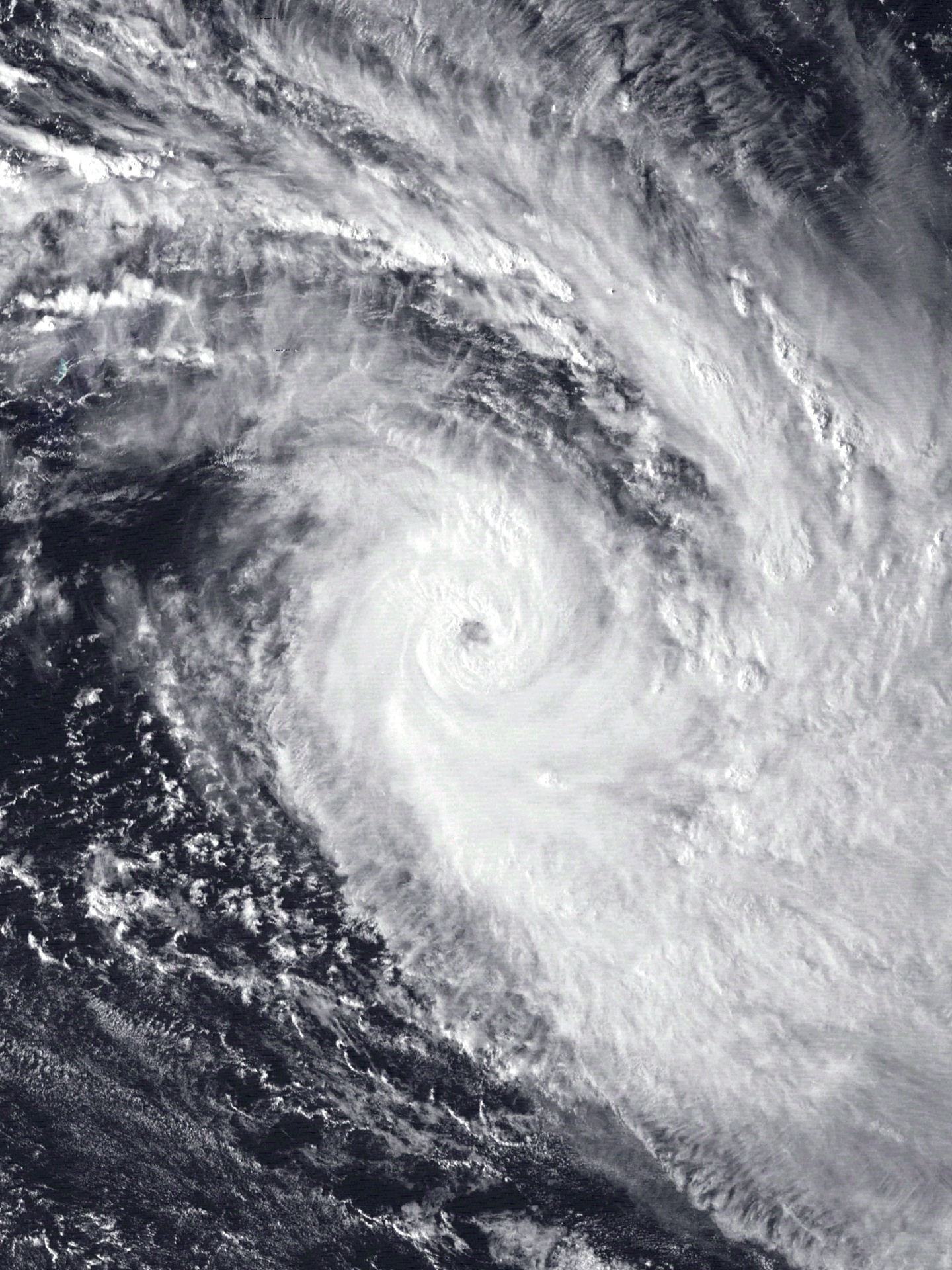
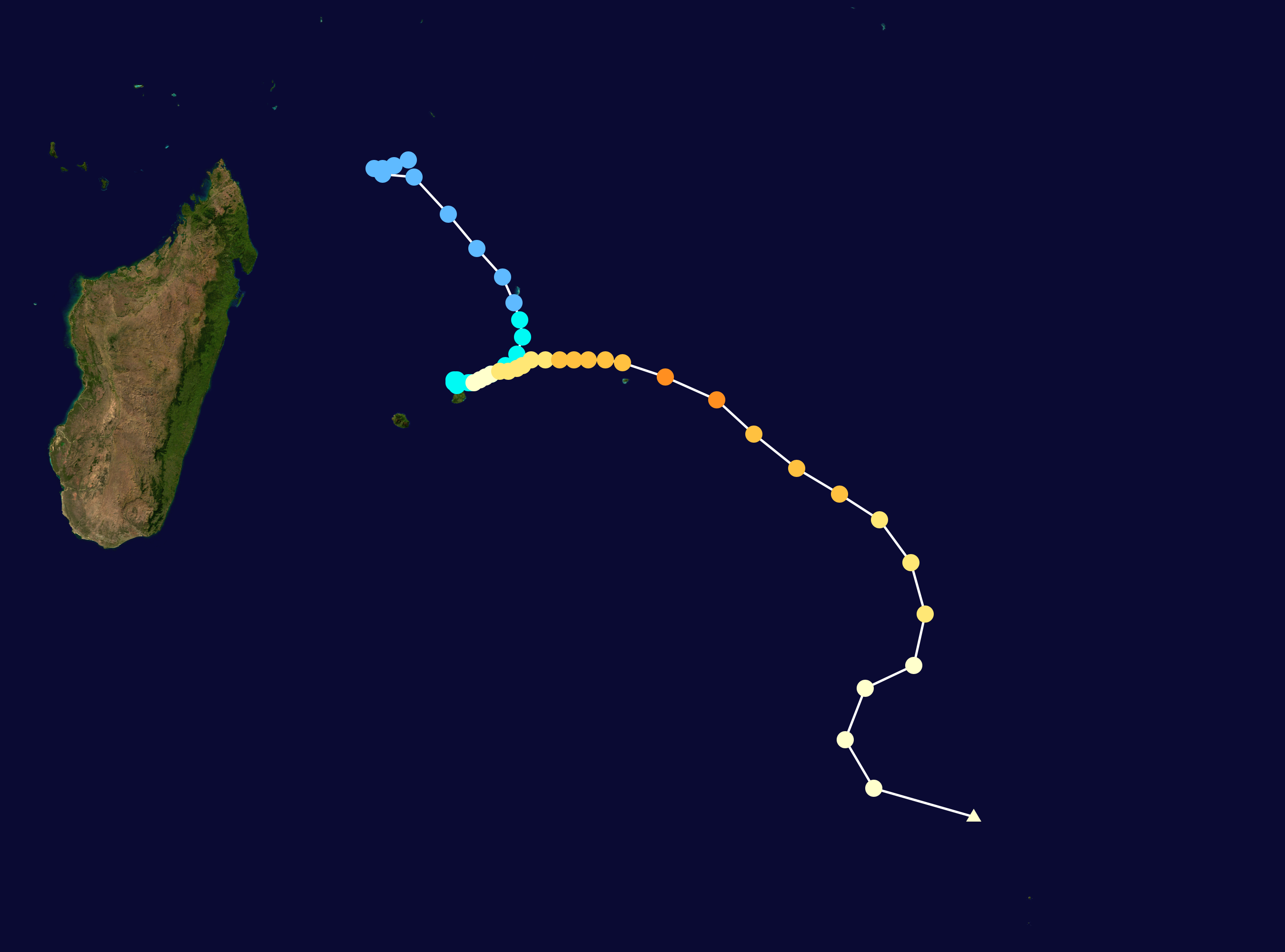
- Duration: January 31 – February 12
- Peak intensity: 170 km/h (105 mph) (10-min); 927 hPa (mbar)

Celine existed from January 31 to February 12. Celine looped near Mauritius while intensifying, and later passed just north of Rodrigues. Wind gusts on the latter island reached 216 km/h (134 mph). The storm killed about half of the population of the critically endangered Rodrigues flying fox.

=== Tropical Depression Dora ===
- Tropical depression (MFR)
- Tropical storm (SSHWS)
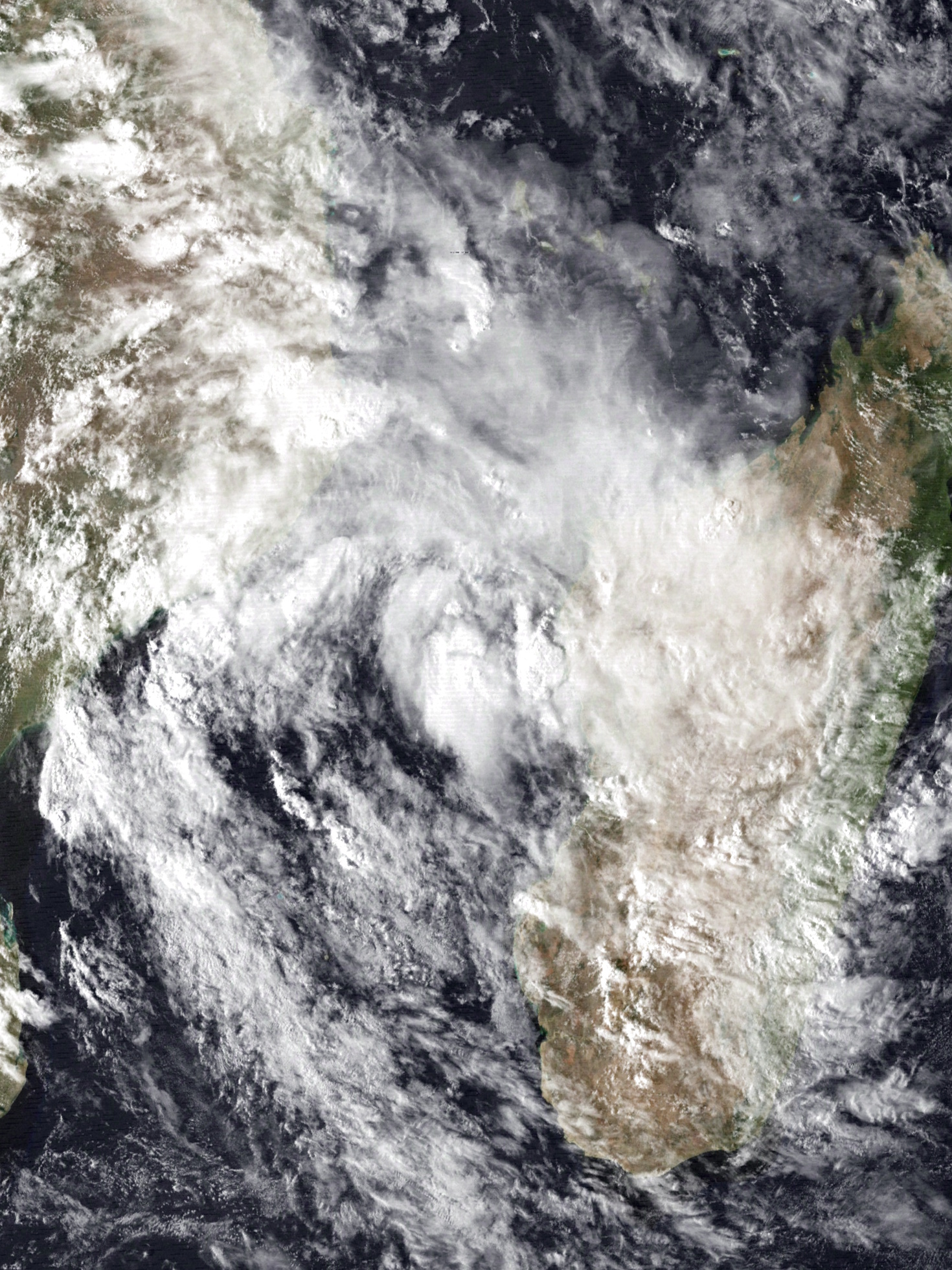
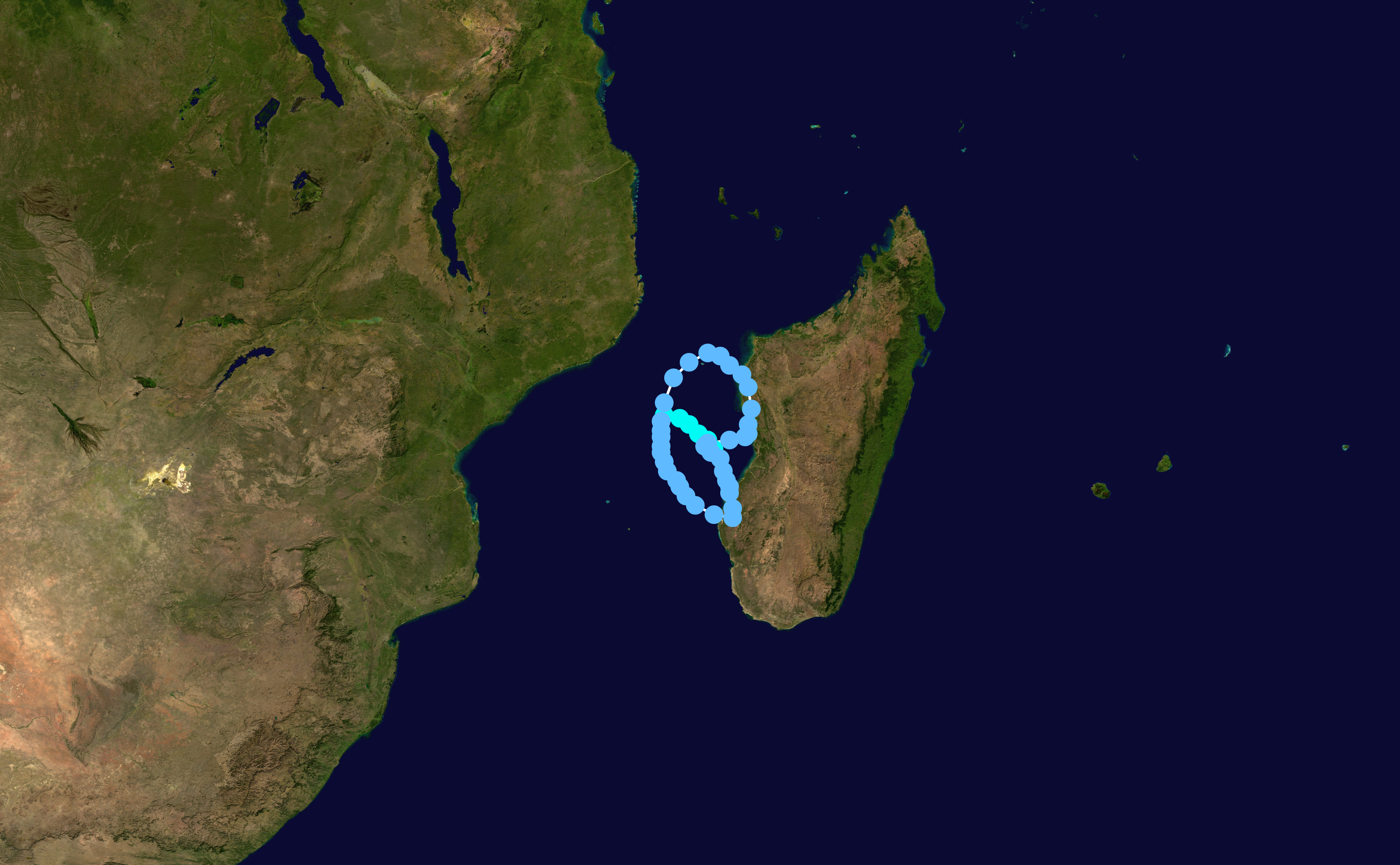
- Duration: February 4 – February 12
- Peak intensity: 50 km/h (30 mph) (10-min); 997 hPa (mbar)

Dora existed from February 4 to February 12.

=== Moderate Tropical Storm Estelle ===
- Moderate tropical storm (MFR)
- Tropical storm (SSHWS)
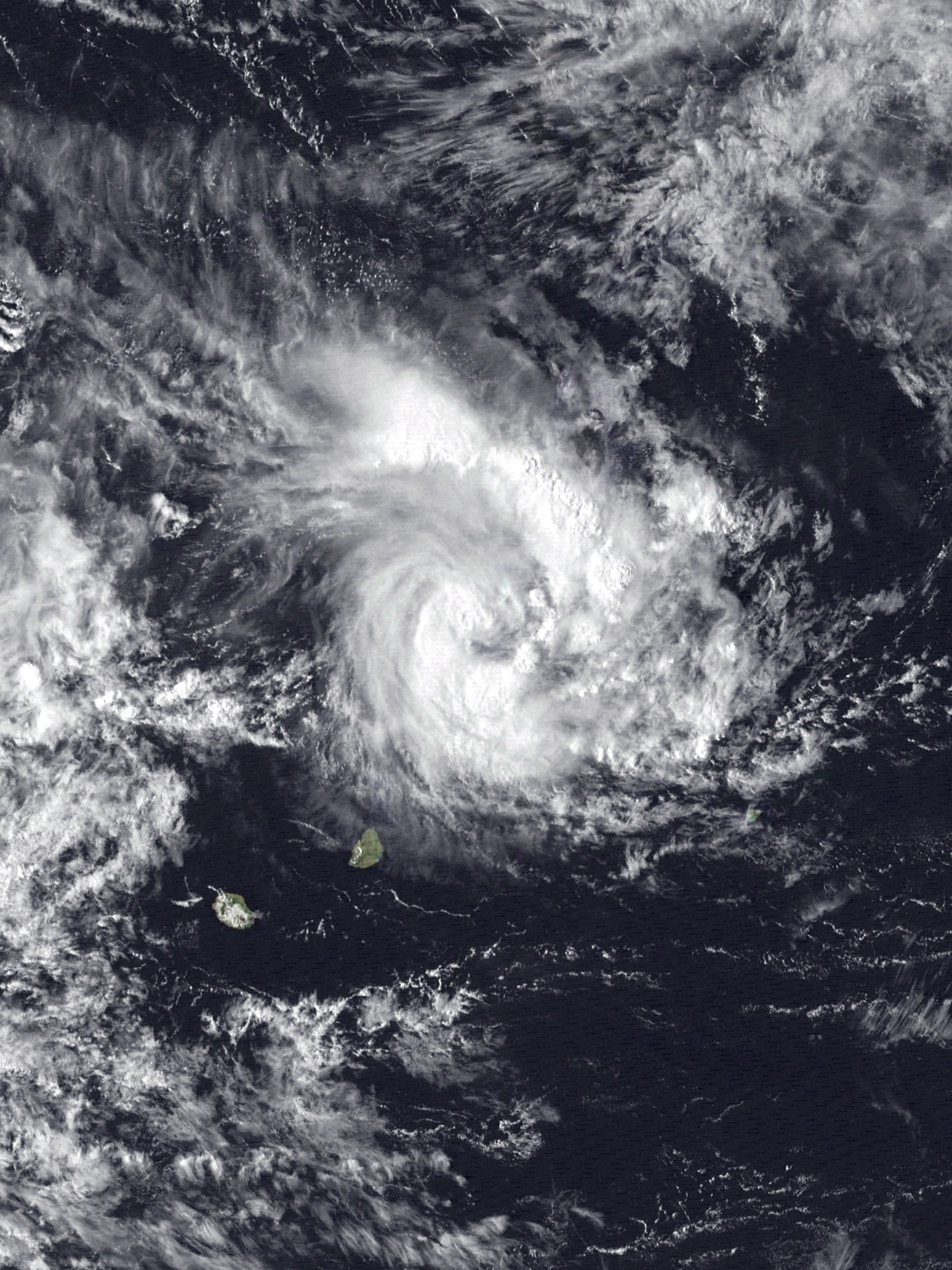
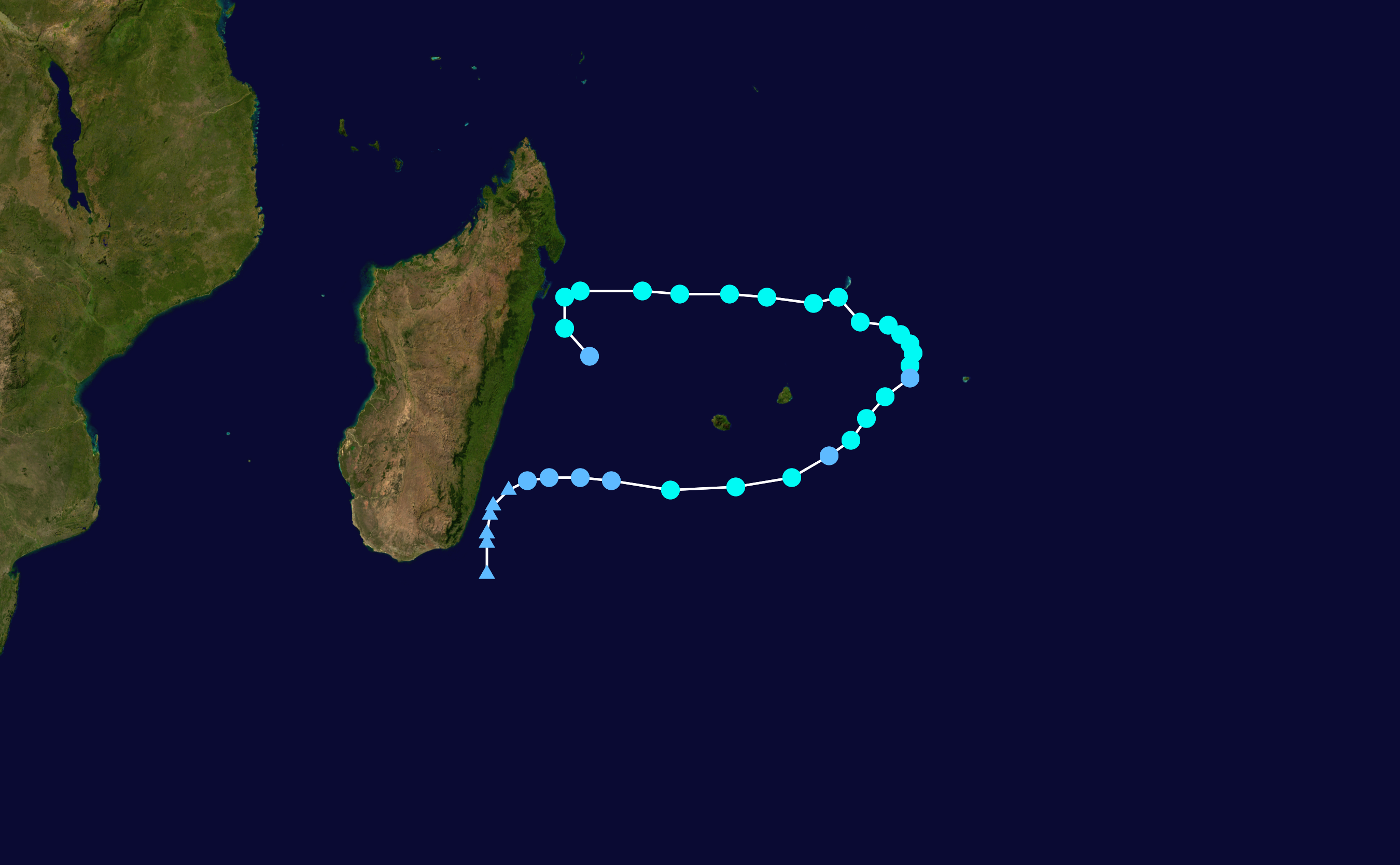
- Duration: February 10 – February 18
- Peak intensity: 65 km/h (40 mph) (10-min); 991 hPa (mbar)

Estelle existed from February 10 to February 18. For several days, Estelle moved around the Mascarene Islands, with a peak rainfall total on Réunion of 544 mm (21.4 in) recorded at Petite Plaine.

=== Tropical Depression Fatou ===
- Tropical depression (MFR)
- Tropical storm (SSHWS)
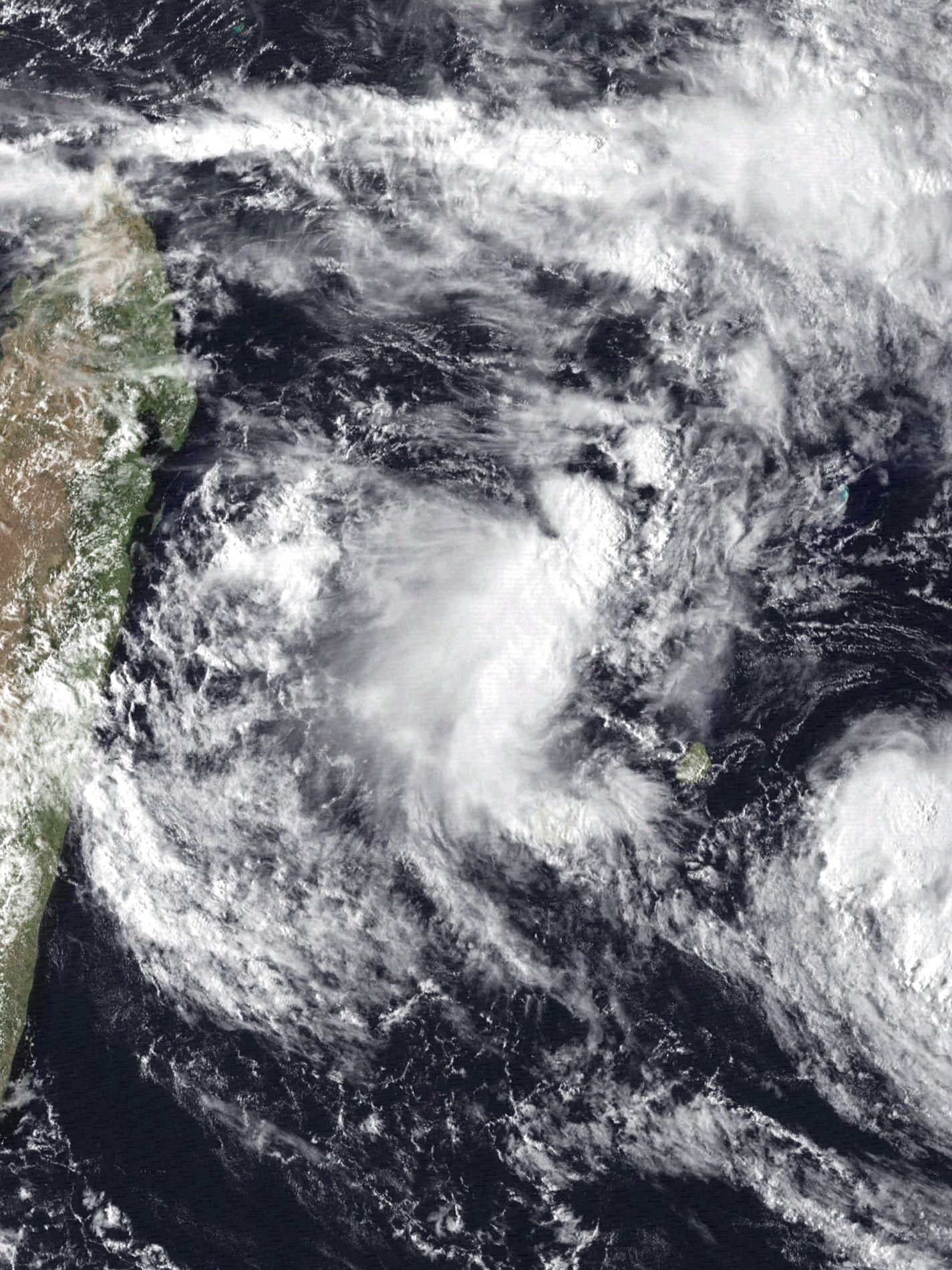
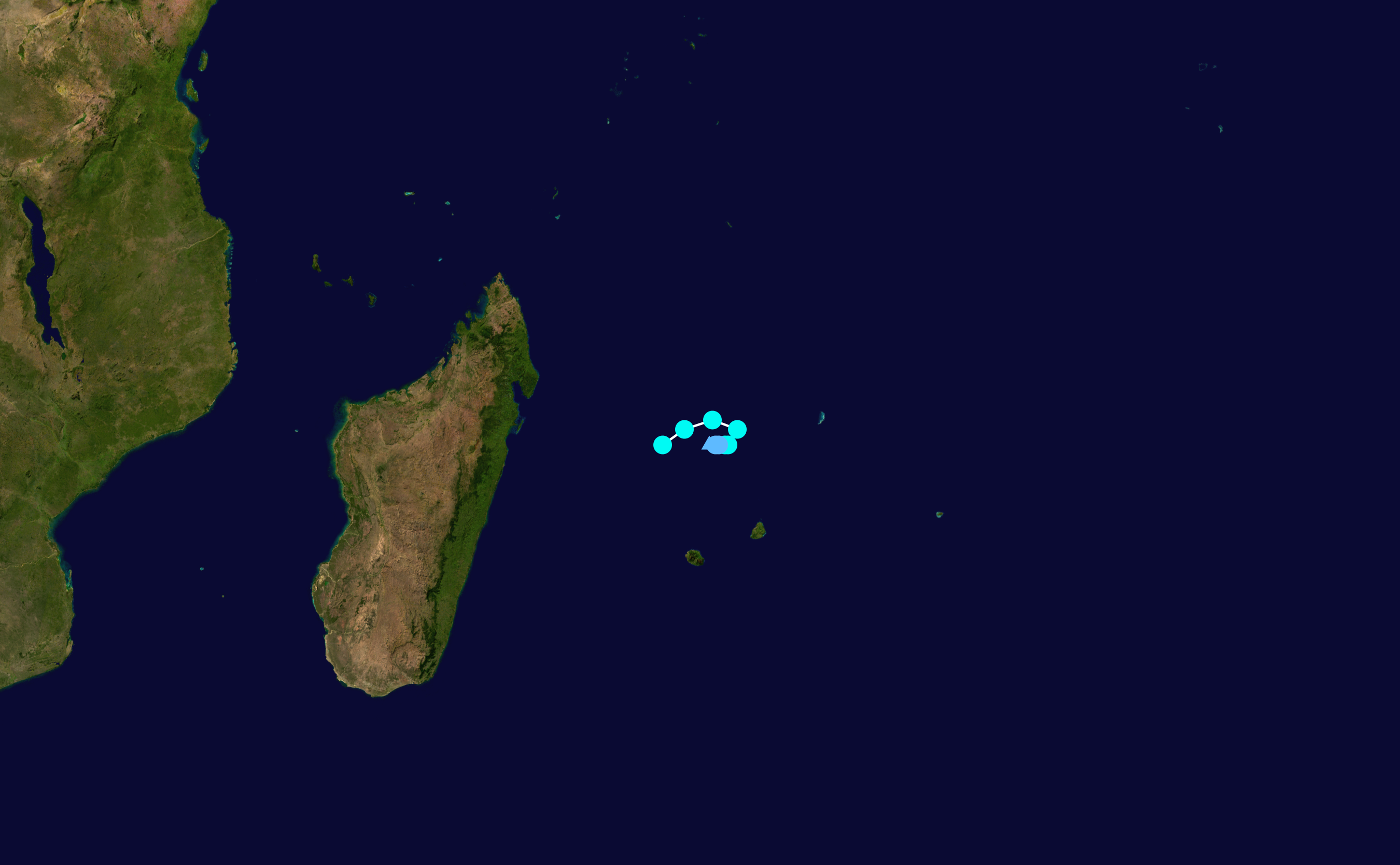
- Duration: February 14 – February 16
- Peak intensity: 50 km/h (30 mph) (10-min); 997 hPa (mbar)

Fatou existed from February 14 to February 16.

=== Tropical Depression Gelie ===
- Tropical depression (MFR)
- Tropical storm (SSHWS)
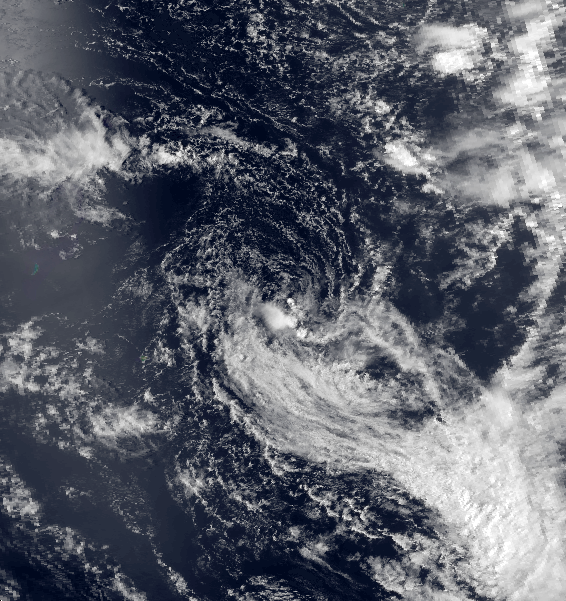
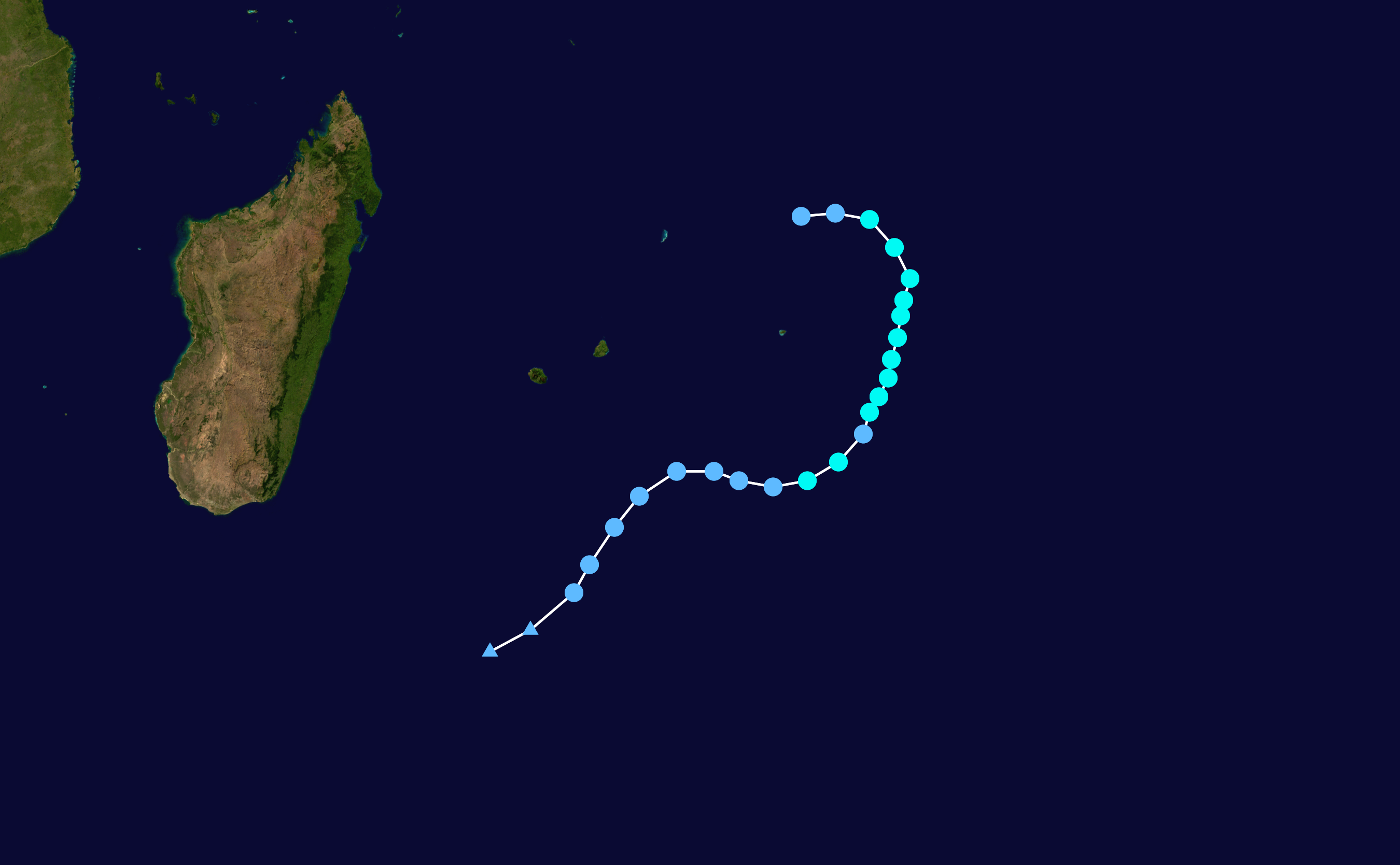
- Duration: March 8 – March 14
- Peak intensity: 50 km/h (30 mph) (10-min); 997 hPa (mbar)

Gelie existed from March 8 to March 14.

=== Tropical Depression Helios ===
- Tropical depression (MFR)
- Tropical storm (SSHWS)
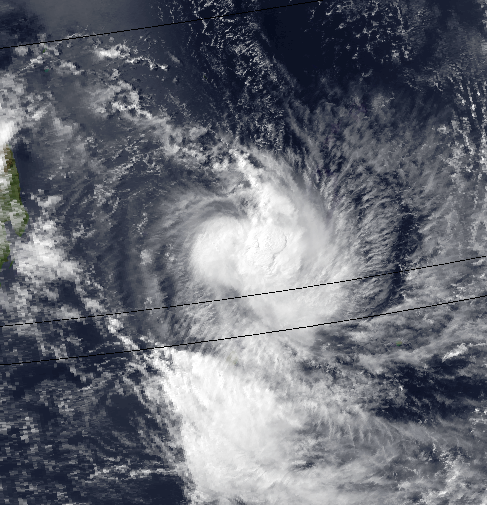
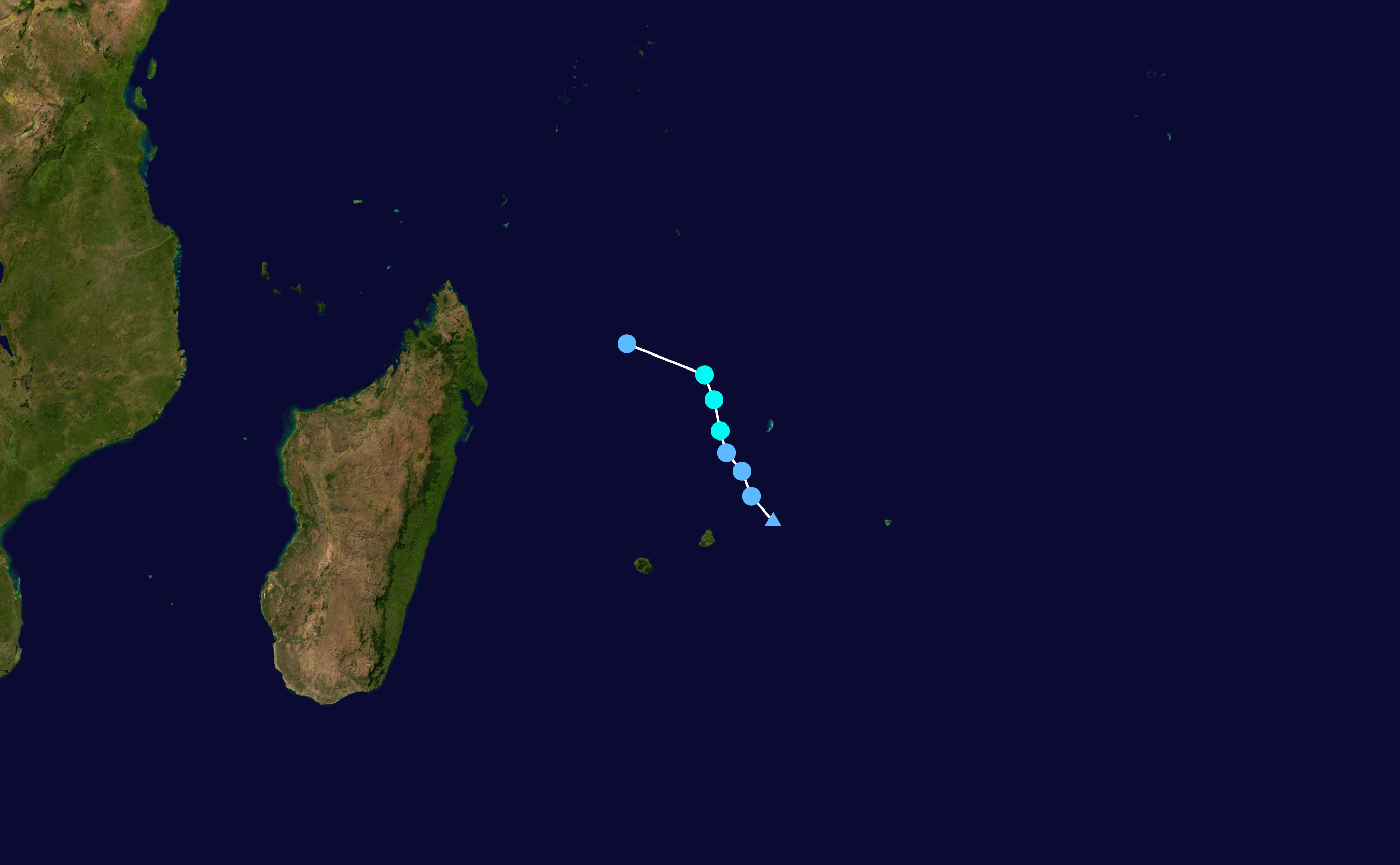
- Duration: March 26 – March 28
- Peak intensity: 50 km/h (30 mph) (10-min); 997 hPa (mbar)

Helios existed from March 26 to March 28.

=== Intense Tropical Cyclone Idylle ===
- Intense tropical cyclone (MFR)
- Category 3 tropical cyclone (SSHWS)
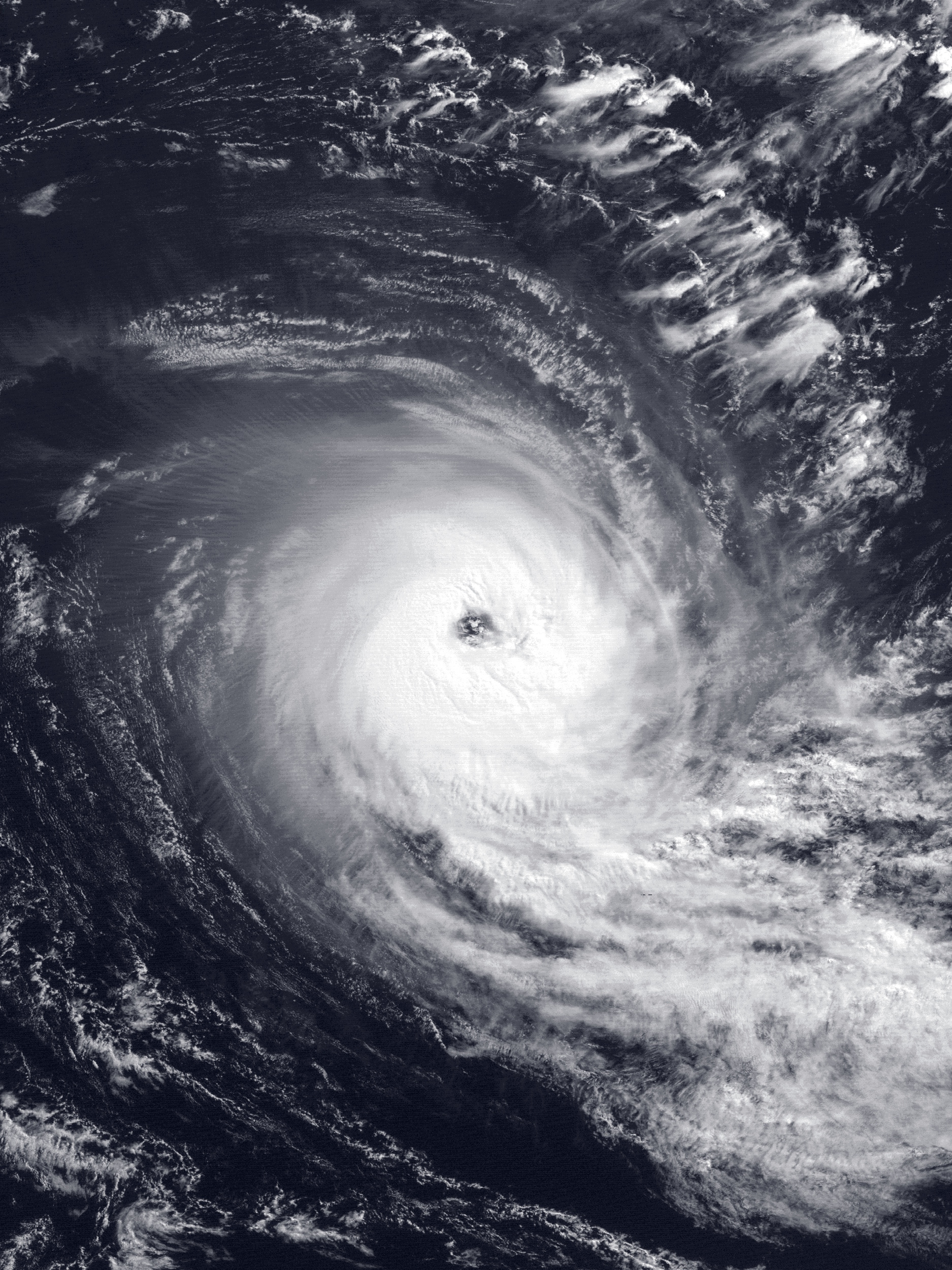
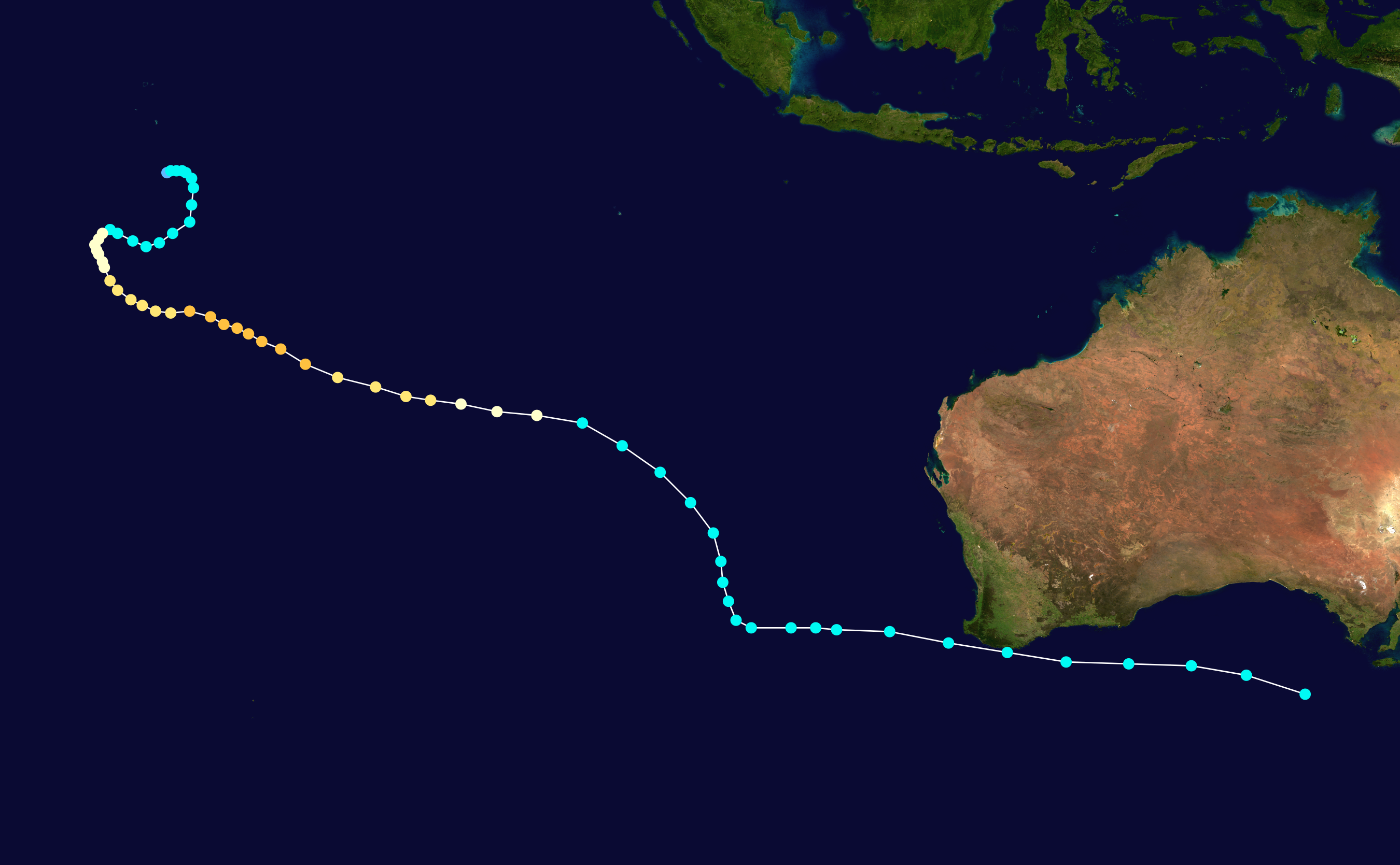
- Duration: April 4 – April 13 (Exited basin)
- Peak intensity: 175 km/h (110 mph) (10-min); 927 hPa (mbar)

Idylle developed on April 4 and left the basin on April 13.

== See also ==
- Tropical cyclones in 1978
- Atlantic hurricane seasons: 1978, 1979
- Eastern Pacific hurricane seasons: 1978, 1979
- Western Pacific typhoon seasons: 1978, 1979
- North Indian Ocean cyclone seasons: 1978, 1979
