= 1979 hurricane season =

1979 hurricane season may refer to:

- The 1979 Atlantic hurricane season
- The 1979 Pacific hurricane season
