= 1979 North Indian Ocean cyclone season =

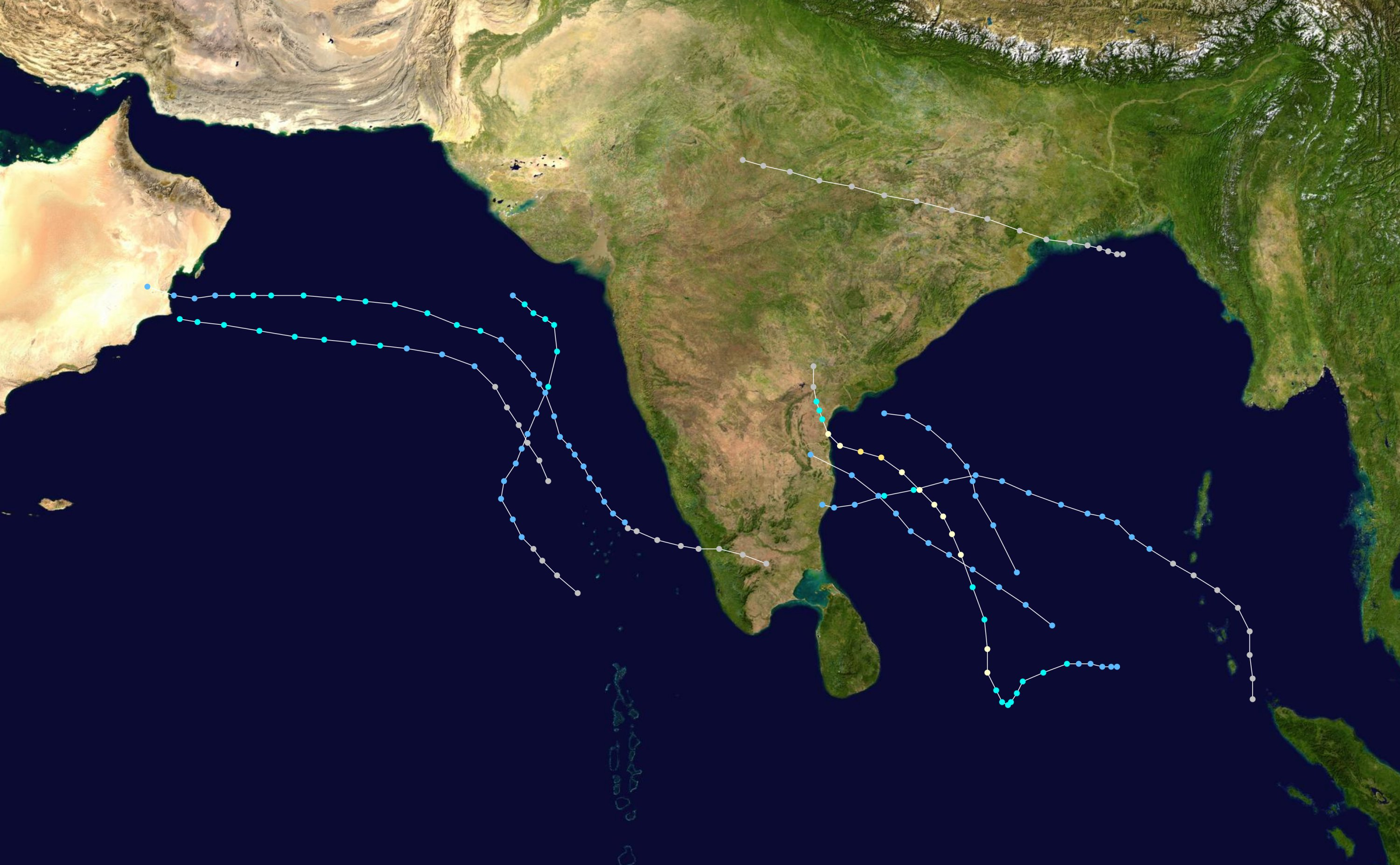
- Season summary map

Seasonal boundaries
- First system formed: May 6, 1979
- Last system dissipated: November 25, 1979

Strongest storm
- Name: One
  - Maximum winds: 185 km/h (115 mph) (3-minute sustained)
  - Lowest pressure: 936 hPa (mbar)

Seasonal statistics
- Depressions: 11
- Cyclonic storms: 5
- Severe cyclonic storms: 4
- Total fatalities: ≥700
- Total damage: Unknown

Related articles
- 1979 Atlantic hurricane season; 1979 Pacific hurricane season; 1979 Pacific typhoon season

Additional information needed

The 1979 North Indian Ocean cyclone season was part of the annual cycle of tropical cyclone formation. The season has no official bounds but cyclones tend to form between April and December. These dates conventionally delimit the period of each year when most tropical cyclones form in the northern Indian Ocean. There are two main seas in the North Indian Ocean—the Bay of Bengal to the east of the Indian subcontinent and the Arabian Sea to the west of India. The official Regional Specialized Meteorological Centre in this basin is the India Meteorological Department (IMD), while the Joint Typhoon Warning Center (JTWC) releases unofficial advisories. An average of five tropical cyclones form in the North Indian Ocean every season with peaks in May and November. Cyclones occurring between the meridians 45°E and 100°E are included in the season by the IMD.

== Systems ==
=== Extremely Severe Cyclonic Storm One (1B) ===
- Extremely severe cyclonic storm (IMD)
- Category 2 tropical cyclone (SSHWS)
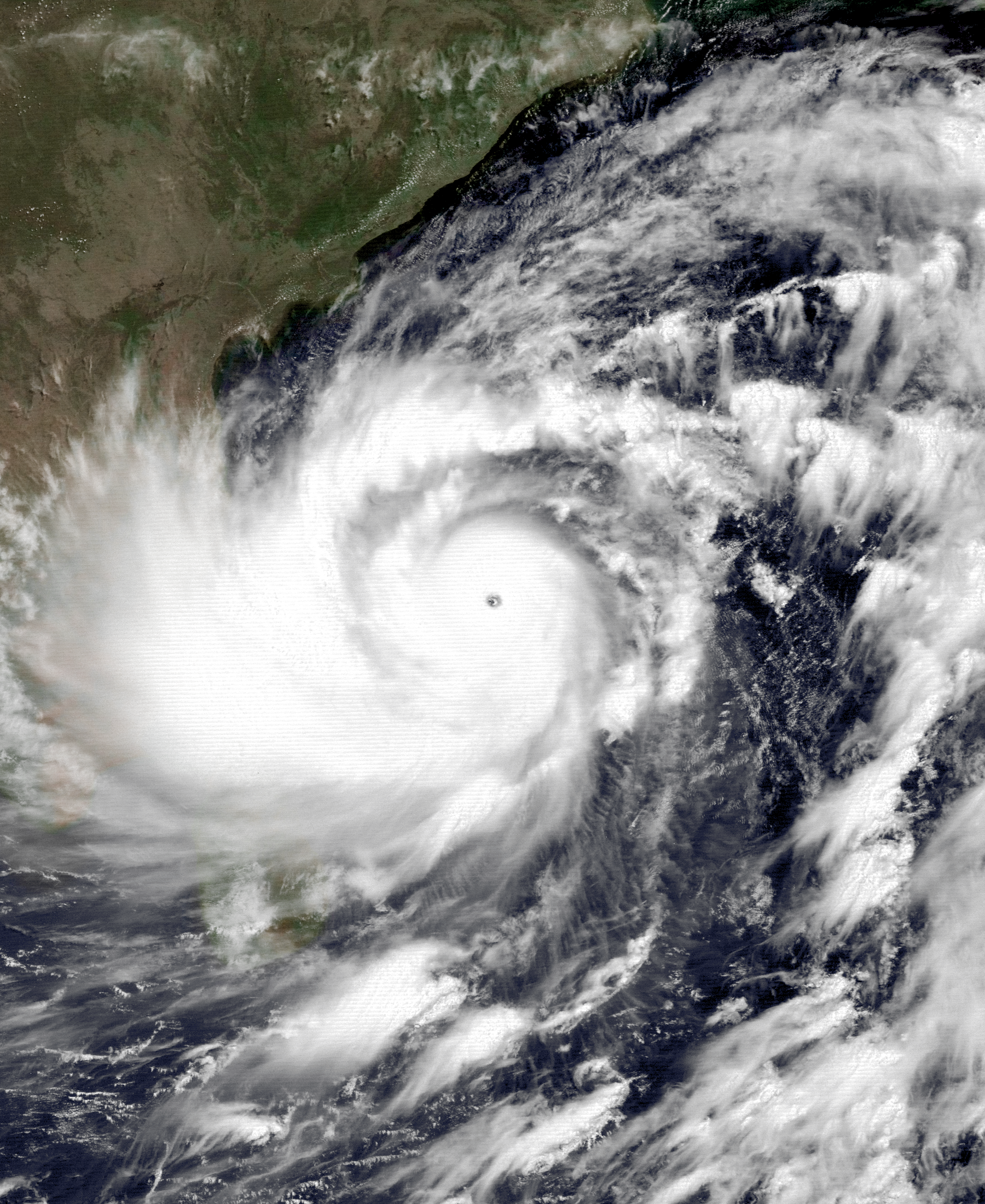
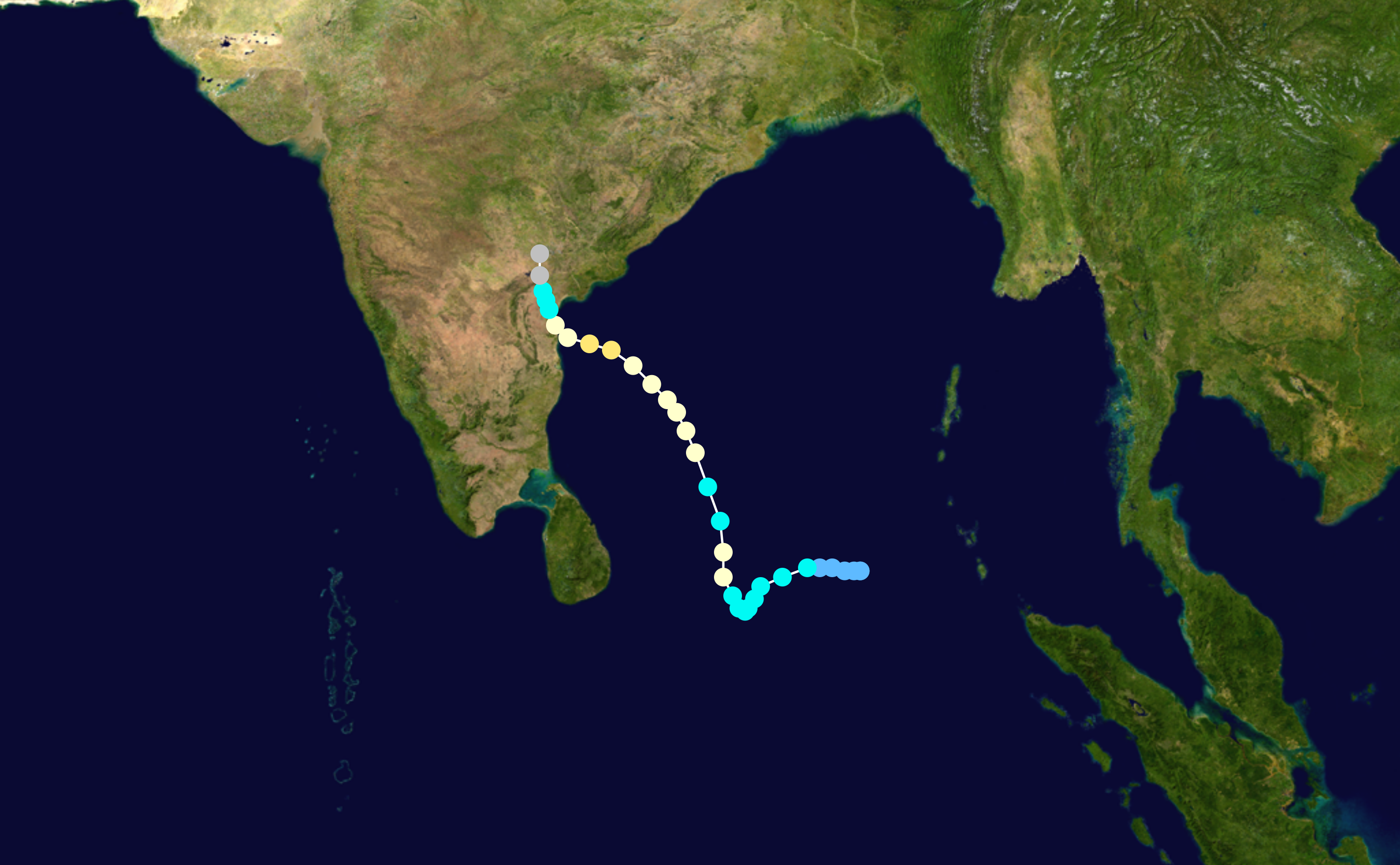
- Duration: May 6 – May 13
- Peak intensity: 185 km/h (115 mph) (3-min); 936 hPa (mbar)

The system formed on 6 May close to the coast of Sri Lanka. It moved towards northwest in its existence after making a small loop. On 13 May, the cyclone made landfall near Ongole in Andhra Pradesh and dissipated rapidly by the same day. The storm killed 700 people and 300,000 cattle. Nellore reported wind gusts up to 155 km/h (95 mph). In Peddaganjam and Kovuur, storm surges were up to 12 ft, which led to coastal flooding in those areas. Together, 4 million people were affected by the storm and nearly 700,000 houses were damaged.

=== Tropical Storm Two (2A) ===
- Cyclonic storm (IMD)
- Tropical storm (SSHWS)
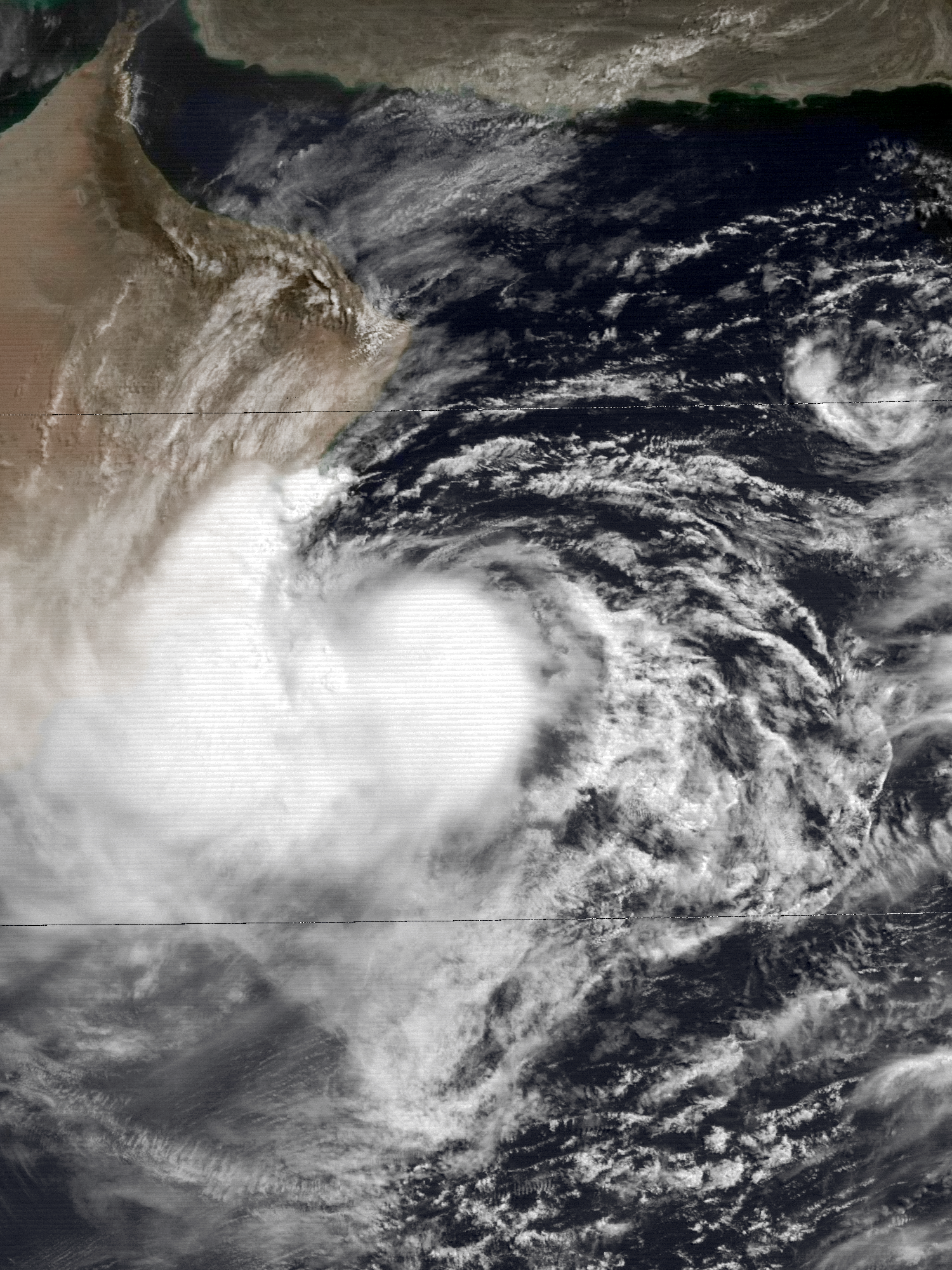
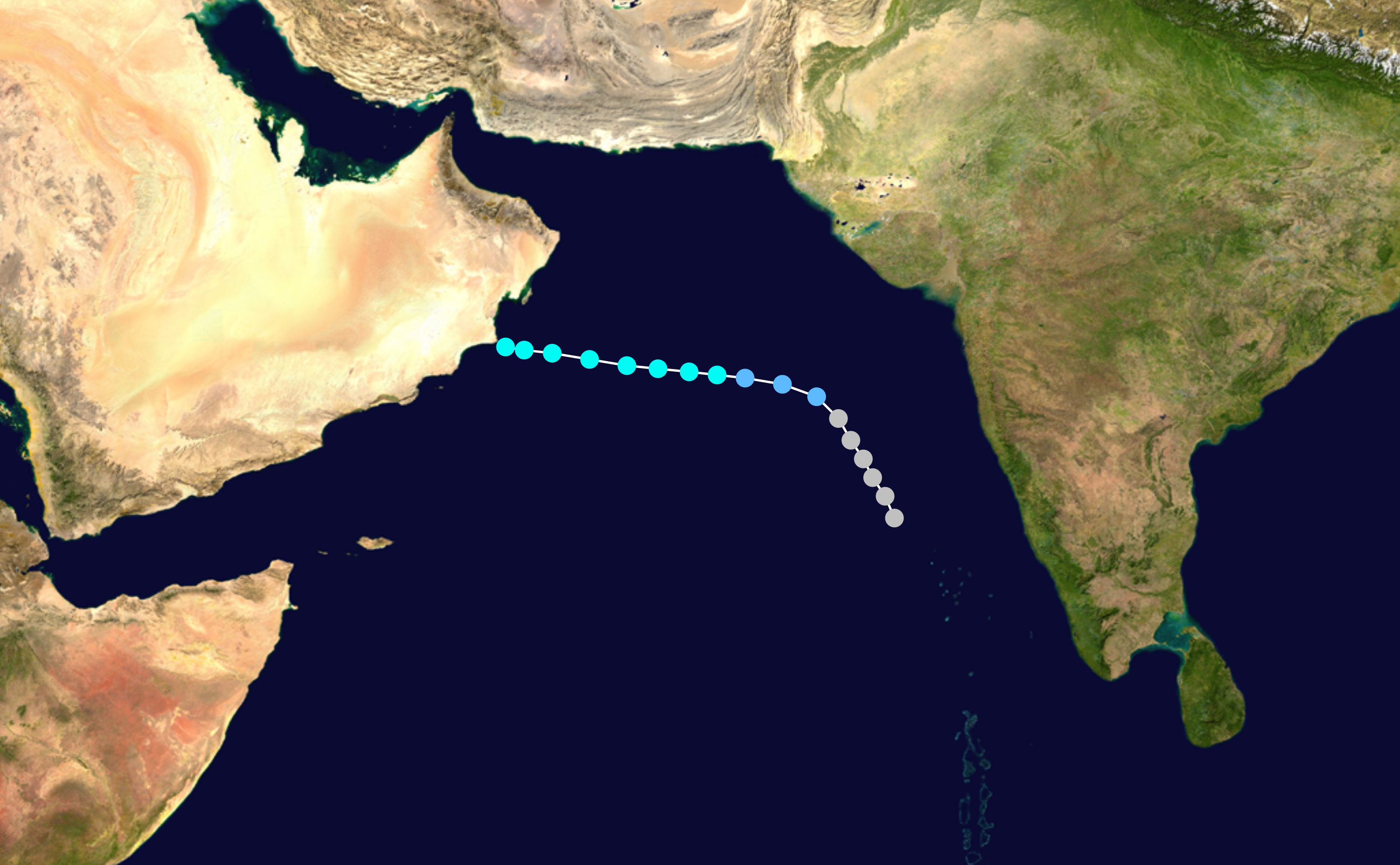
- Duration: June 18 – June 20
- Peak intensity: 75 km/h (45 mph) (3-min);

=== Tropical Storm Three (3B) ===
- Severe cyclonic storm (IMD)
- Tropical storm (SSHWS)
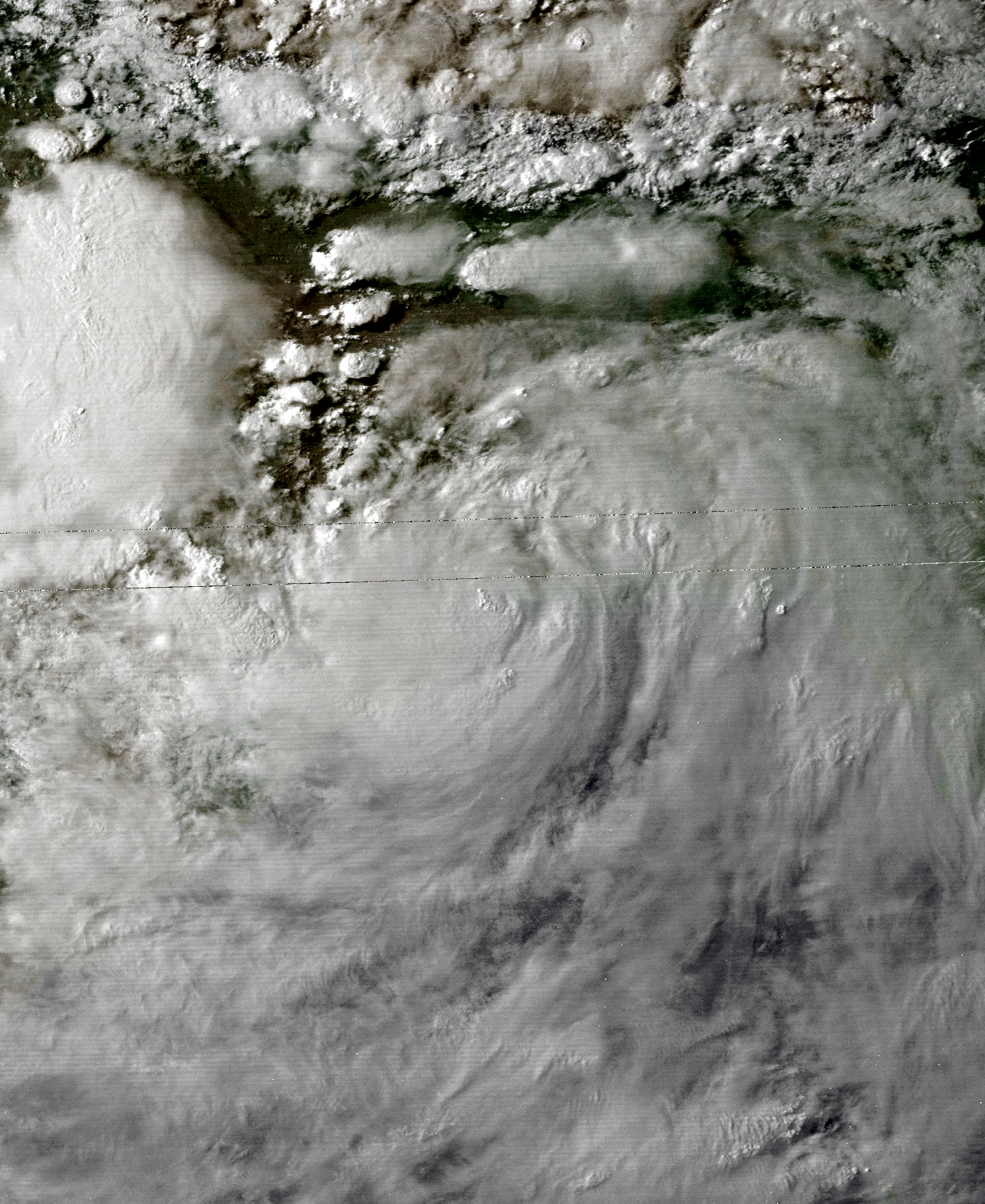
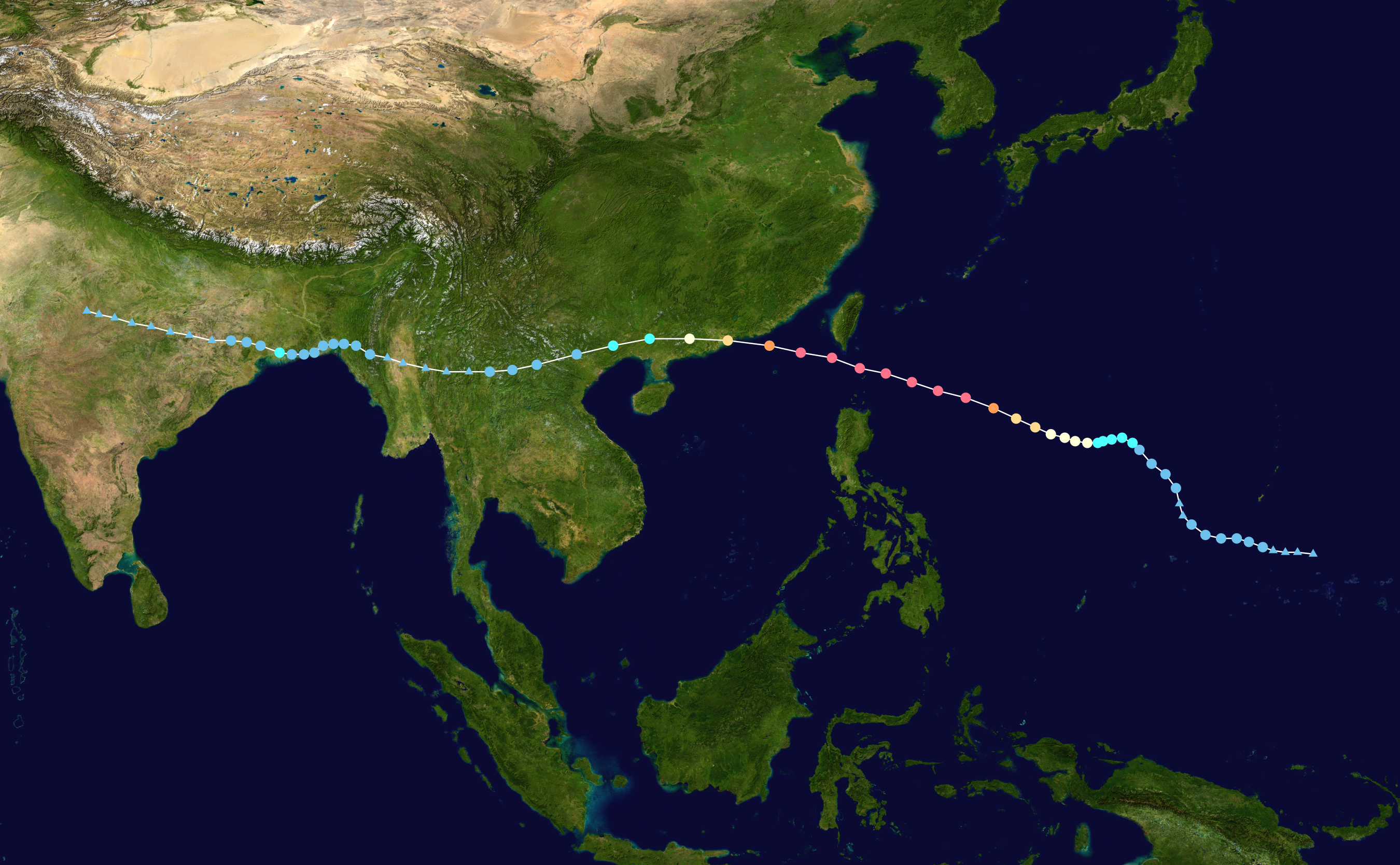
- Duration: August 5 – August 8
- Peak intensity: 100 km/h (65 mph) (3-min);

=== Tropical Storm Four (4B/4A) ===
- Severe cyclonic storm (IMD)
- Tropical storm (SSHWS)
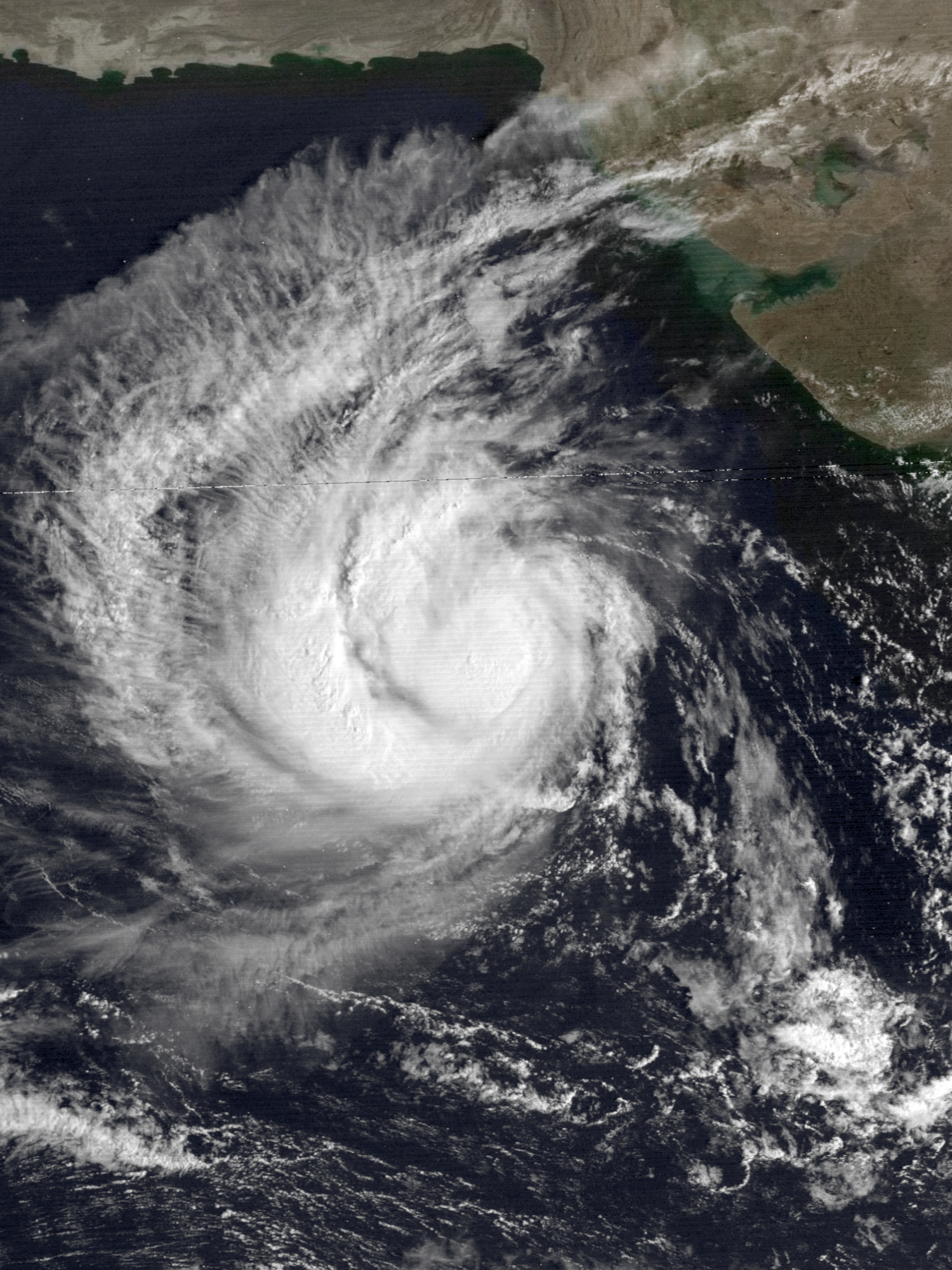
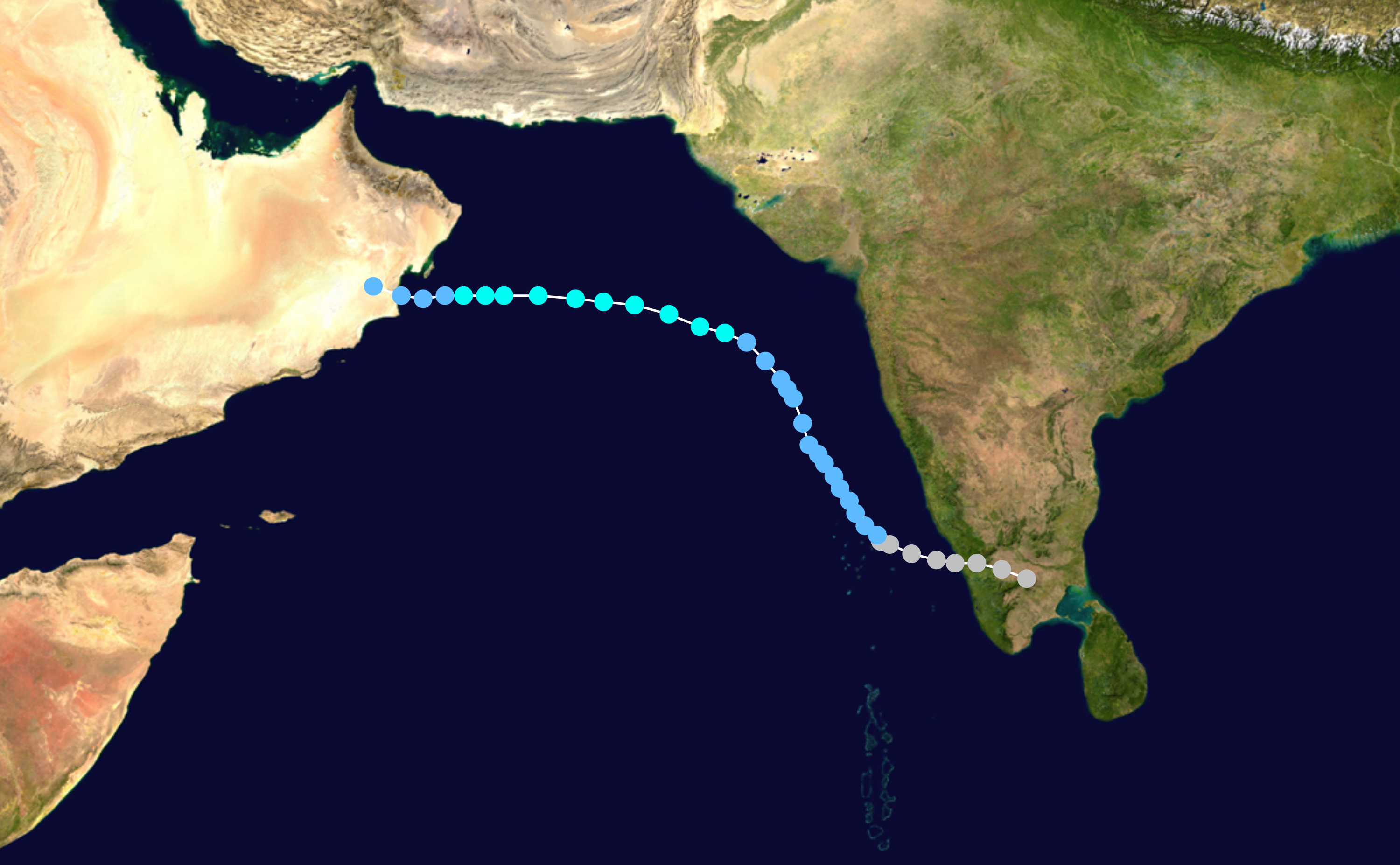
- Duration: September 21 – September 23
- Peak intensity: 110 km/h (70 mph) (3-min);

=== Tropical Depression Five (5B) ===
- Depression (IMD)
- Tropical depression (SSHWS)
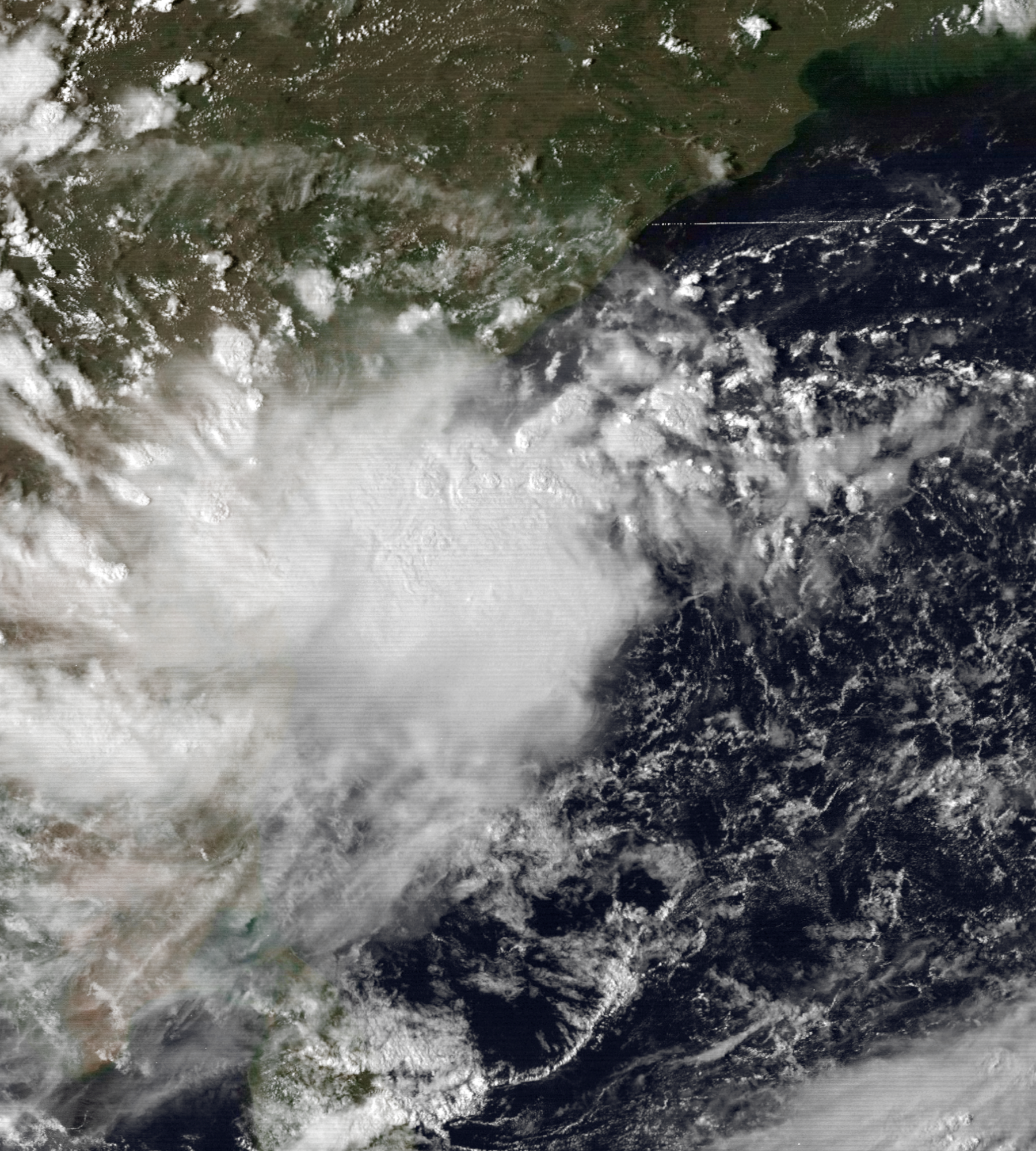
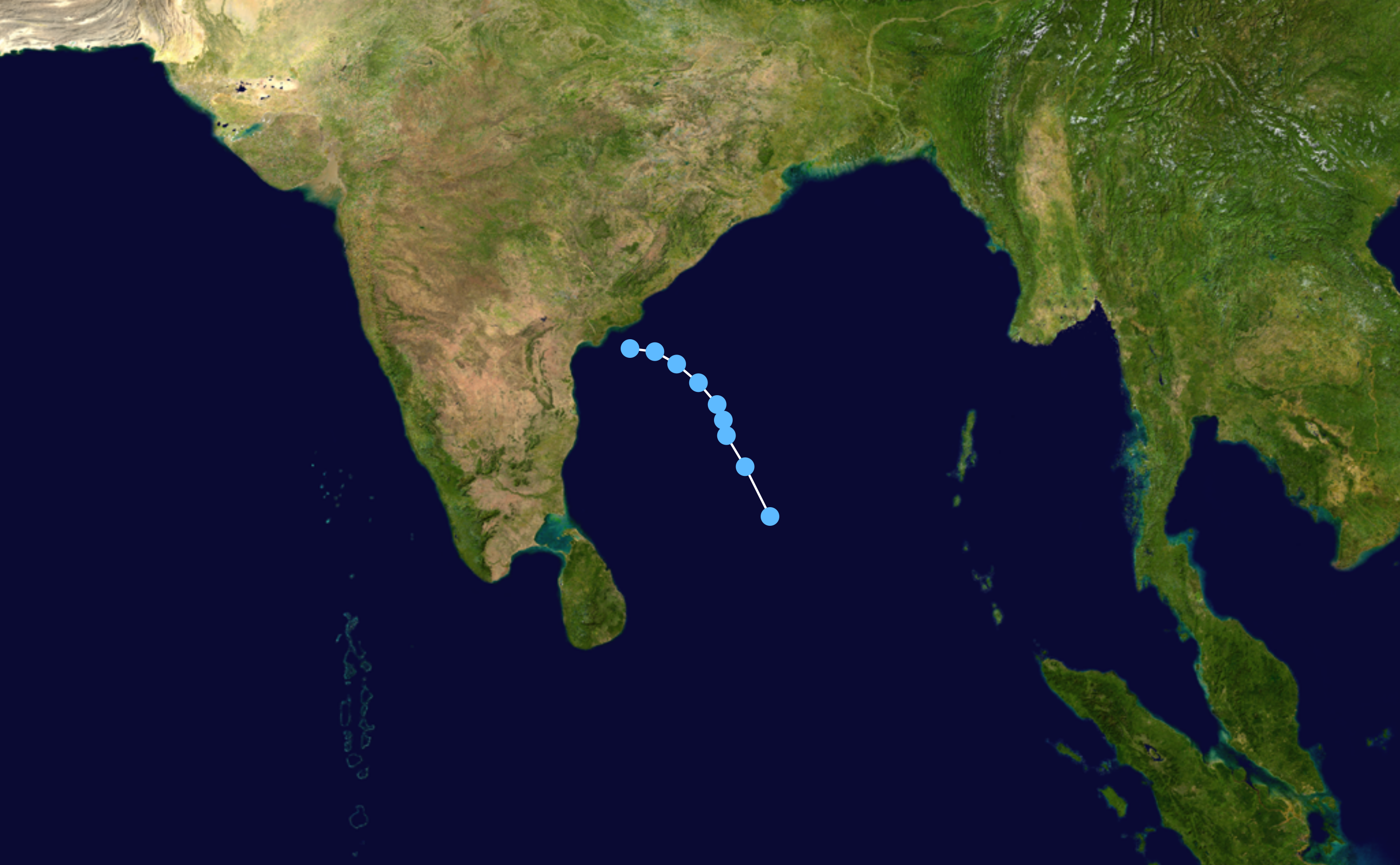
- Duration: September 21 – September 25
- Peak intensity: 45 km/h (30 mph) (3-min);

=== Tropical Storm Six (6B) ===
- Depression (IMD)
- Tropical storm (SSHWS)
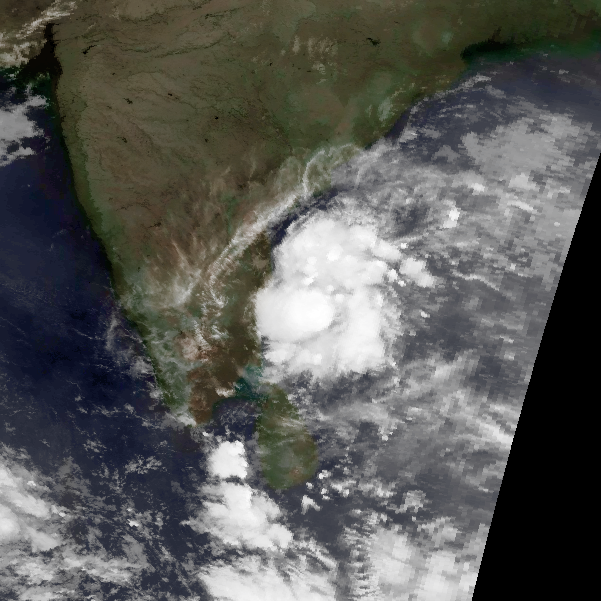
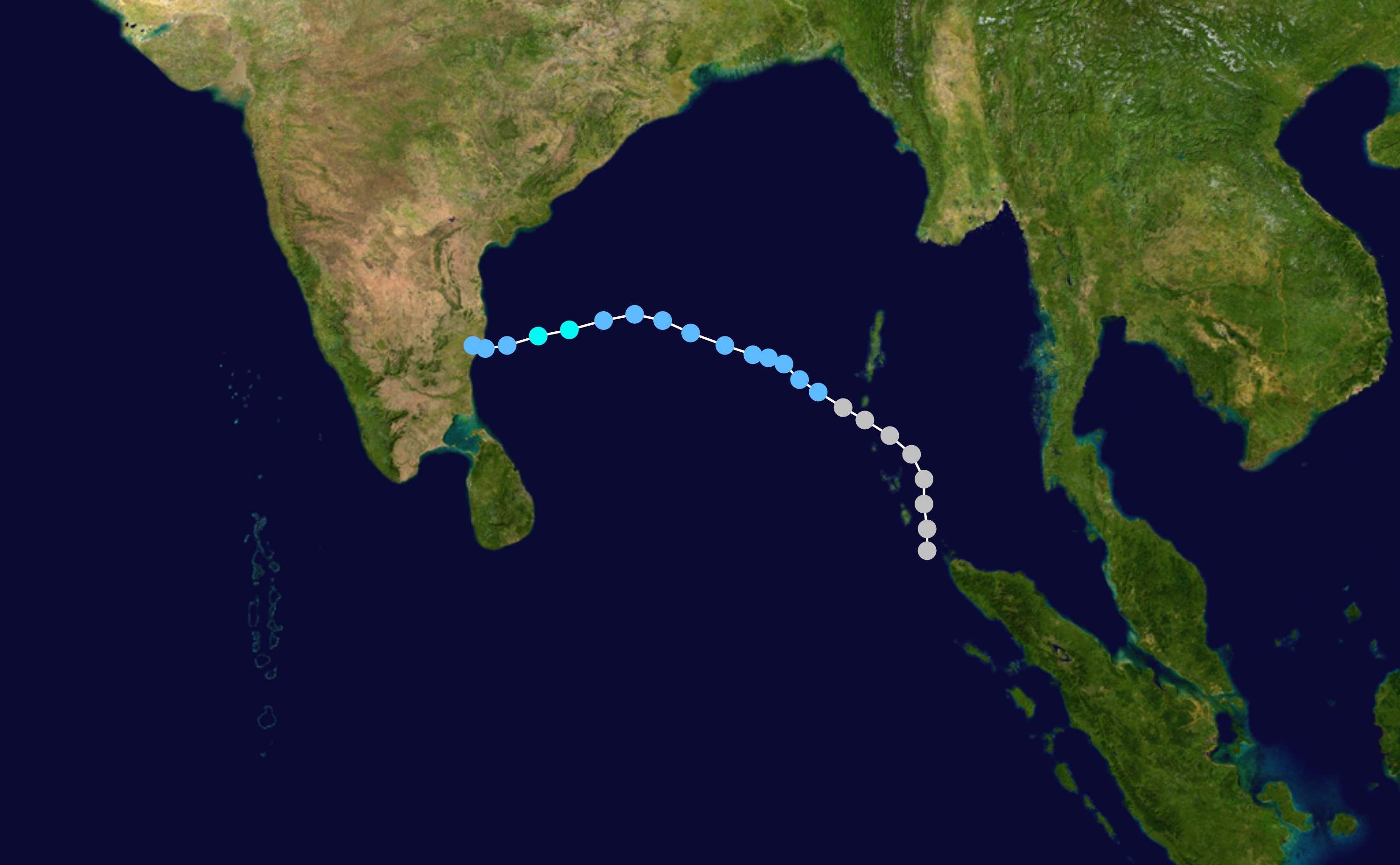
- Duration: October 29 – November 1
- Peak intensity: 45 km/h (30 mph) (3-min);

=== Tropical Storm Seven (7A) ===
- Cyclonic storm (IMD)
- Tropical storm (SSHWS)
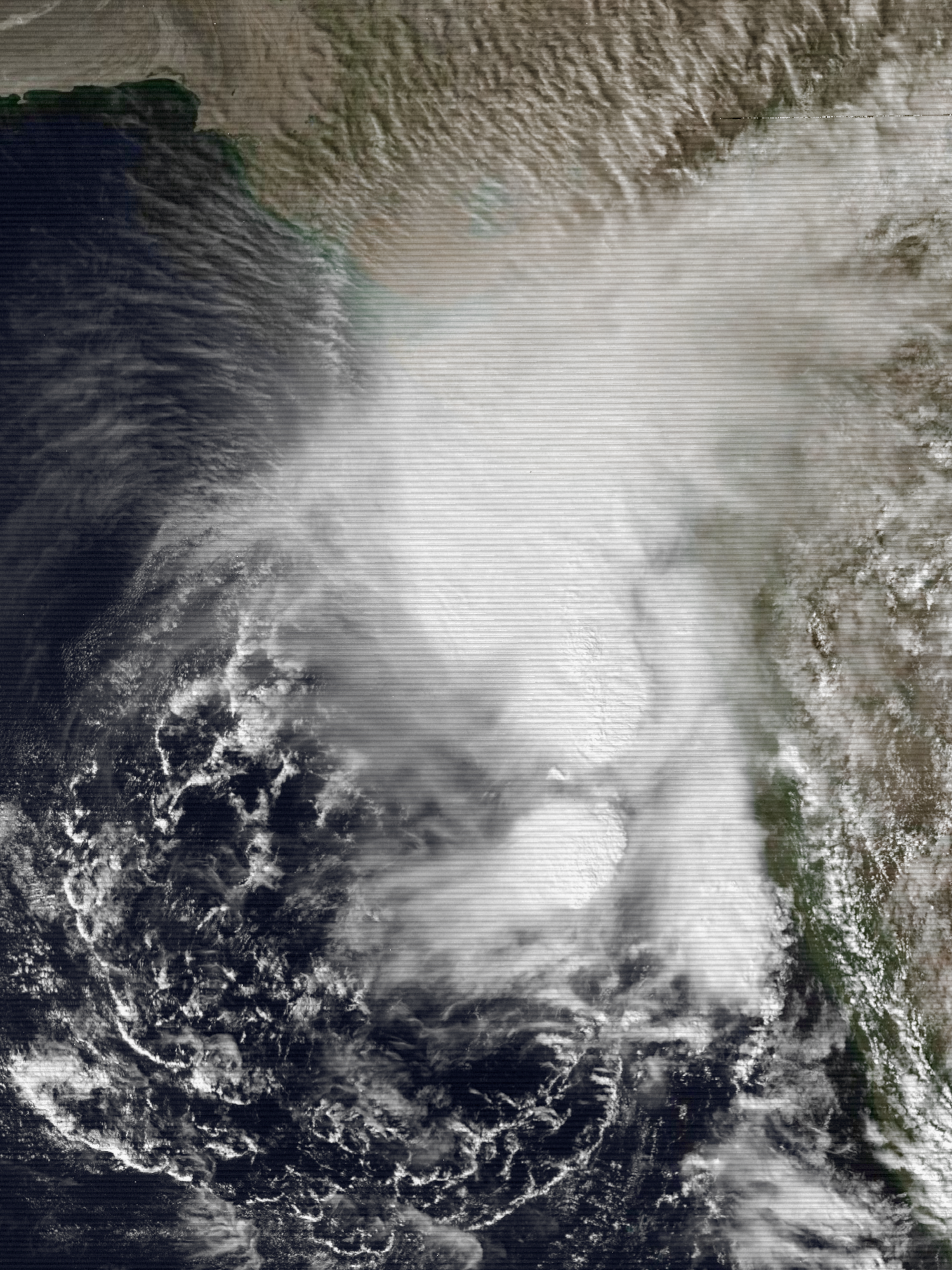
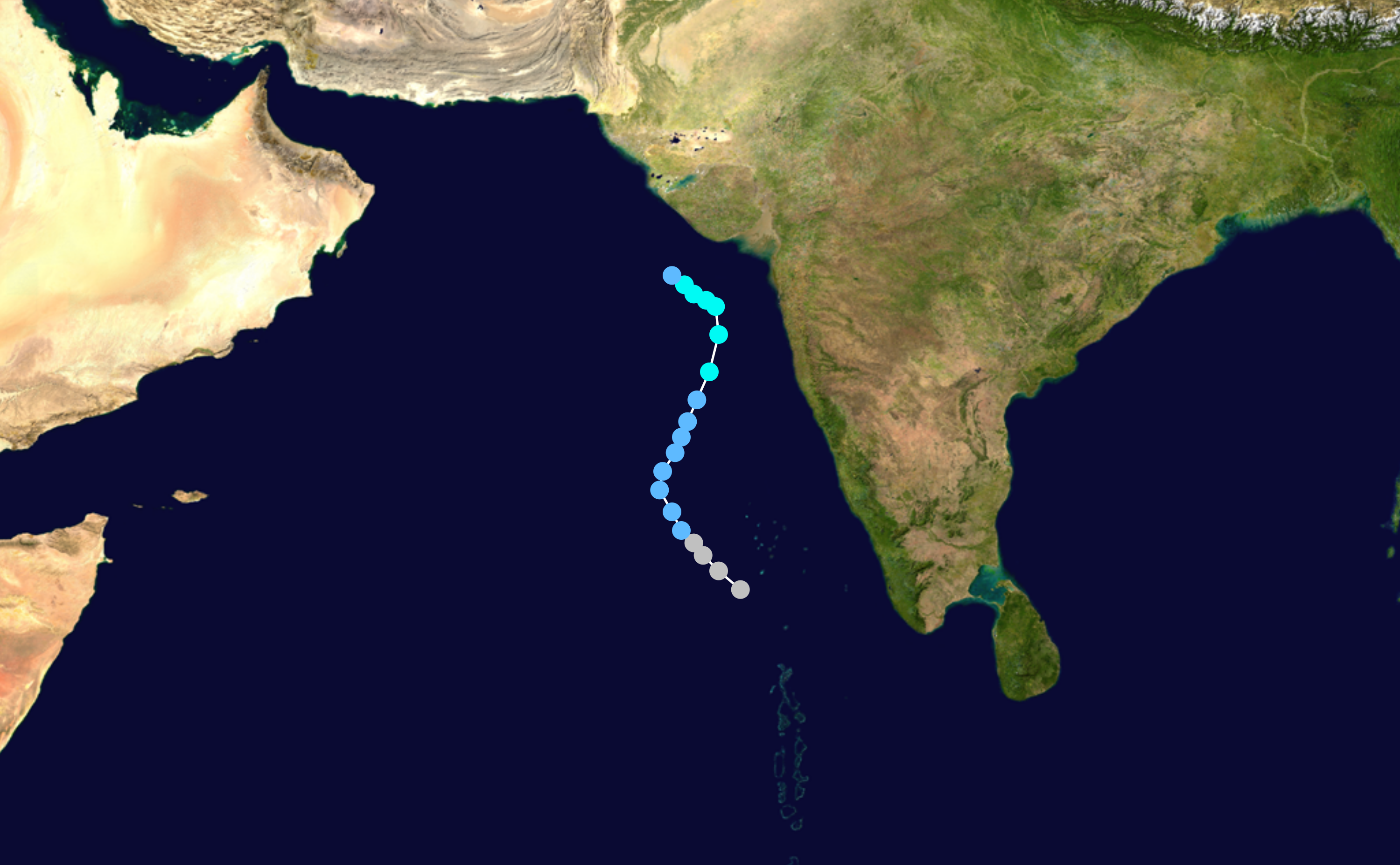
- Duration: November 16 – November 17
- Peak intensity: 65 km/h (40 mph) (3-min);

=== Tropical Depression Eight (8B) ===
- Deep depression (IMD)
- Tropical depression (SSHWS)
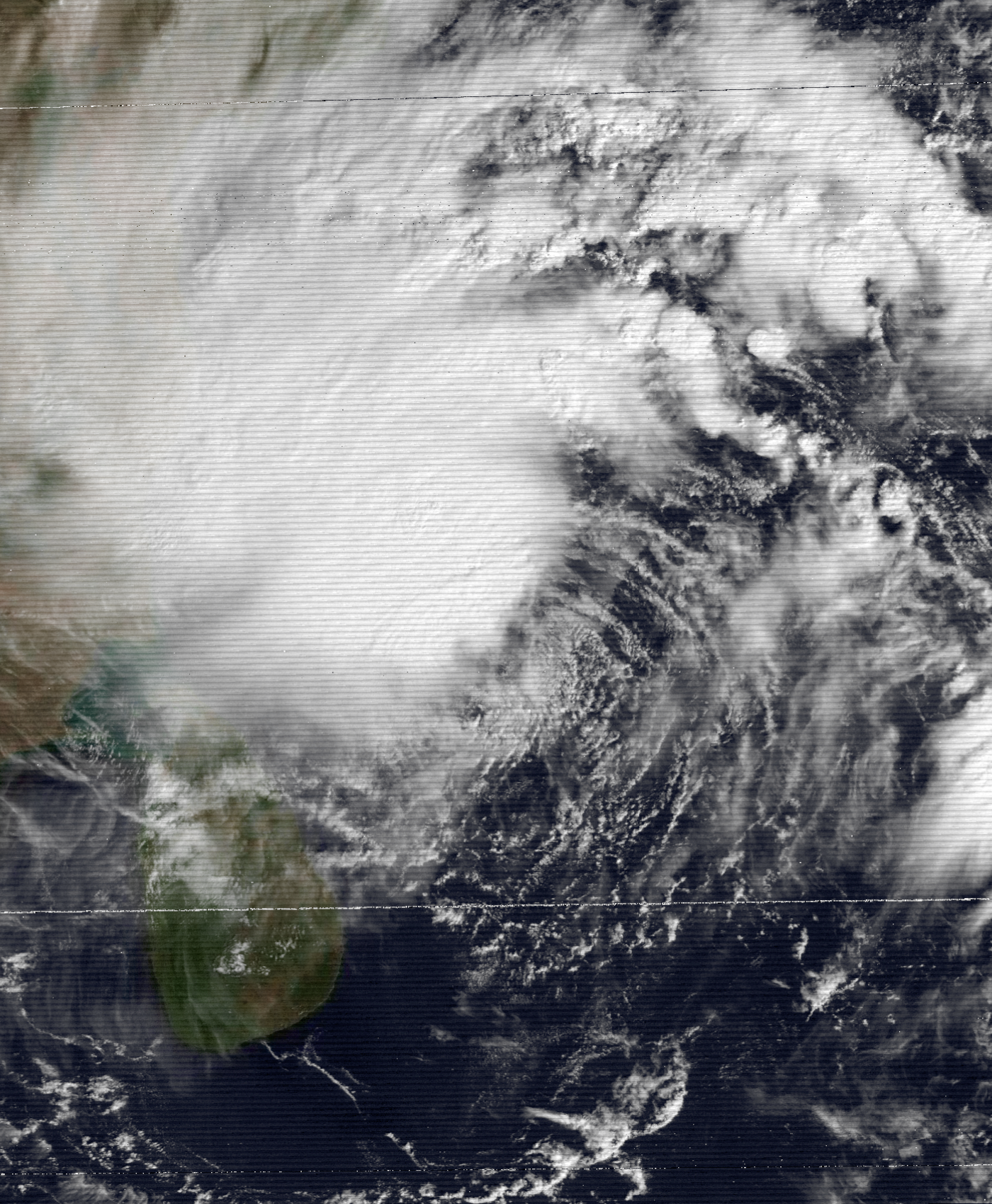
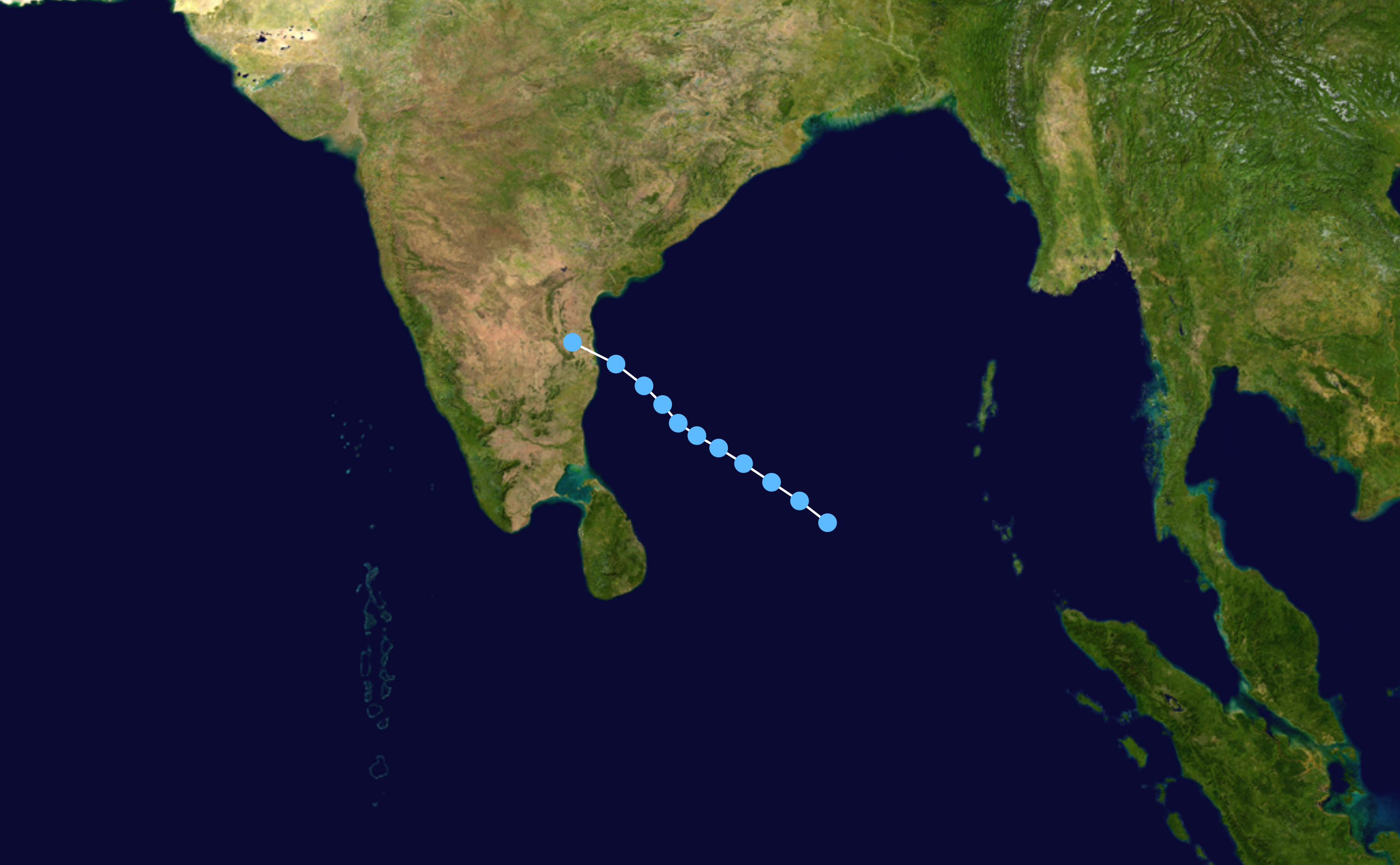
- Duration: November 23 – November 25
- Peak intensity: 55 km/h (35 mph) (3-min);

== See also ==
- North Indian Ocean tropical cyclone
- 1979 Atlantic hurricane season
- 1979 Pacific hurricane season
- 1979 Pacific typhoon season
- Australian cyclone seasons: 1978–79, 1979–80
- South Pacific cyclone seasons: 1978–79, 1979–80
- South-West Indian Ocean cyclone seasons: 1978–79, 1979–80
