= 1979 Pacific hurricane season =

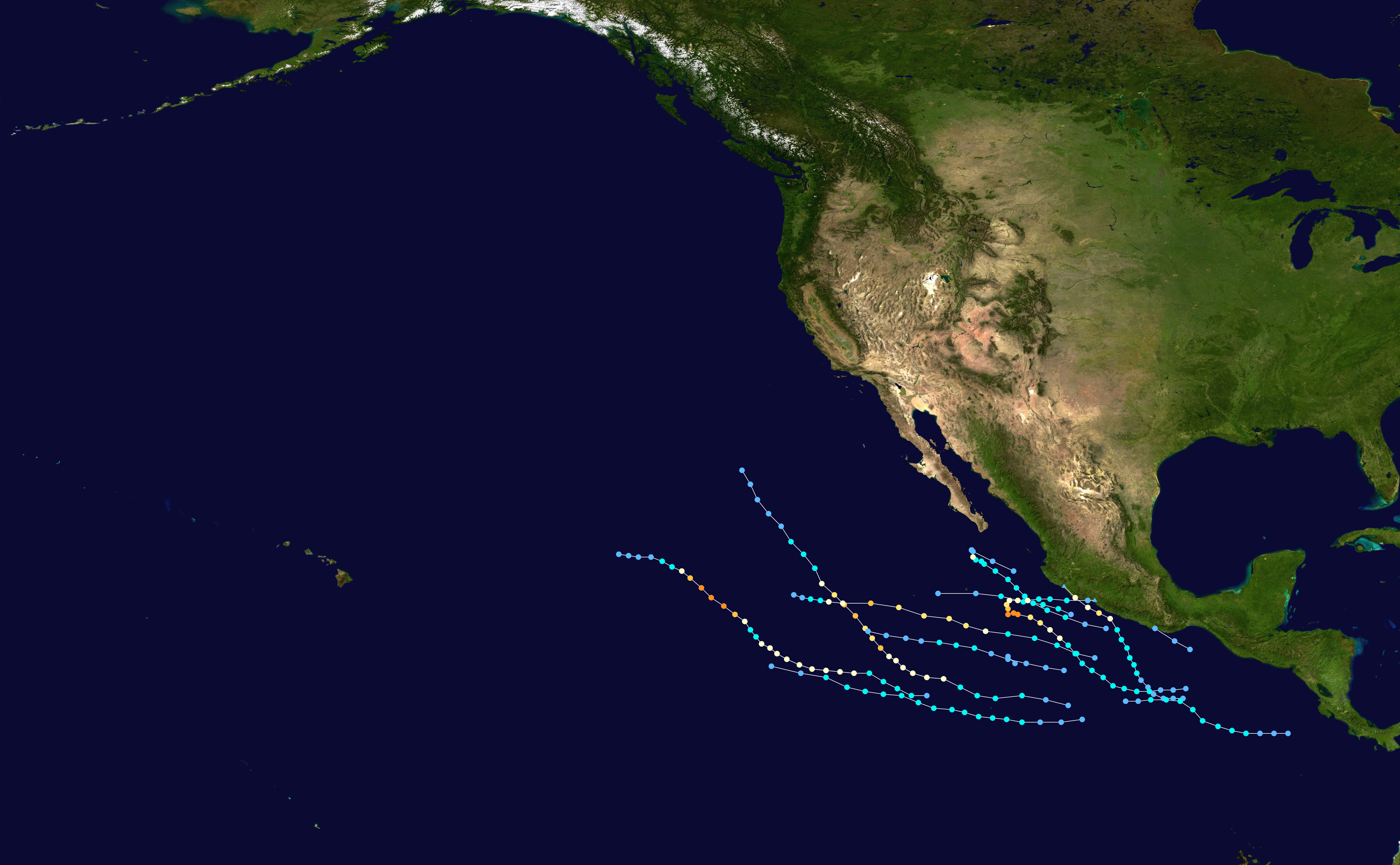
- Season summary map

Seasonal boundaries
- First system formed: May 31, 1979
- Last system dissipated: November 18, 1979

Strongest storm
- Name: Ignacio
  - Maximum winds: 145 mph (230 km/h) (1-minute sustained)
  - Lowest pressure: 938 mbar (hPa; 27.7 inHg)

Seasonal statistics
- Total storms: 10
- Hurricanes: 6
- Major hurricanes (Cat. 3+): 4
- Total fatalities: 2
- Total damage: None

Related articles
- 1979 Atlantic hurricane season; 1979 Pacific typhoon season; 1979 North Indian Ocean cyclone season

The 1979 Pacific hurricane season was an inactive North Pacific hurricane season, featuring 10 named storms, 6 hurricanes, and 4 major hurricanes. (Note: A "major" hurricane is one that reaches Category 3 or higher on the Saffir–Simpson scale; this corresponds to having winds of at least 110 mph (178 km/h).) All tropical cyclone activity this season was confined to the Eastern Pacific, east of 140°W. For the first time since 1977, no tropical cyclones formed in, or entered into the Central Pacific, between 140°W and the International Date Line.

The season officially started on May 15, 1979 in the Eastern Pacific and on June 1 in the Central Pacific; they both ended on November 30, 1979. These dates conventionally delimit the period of each year when most tropical cyclones form in these basins. The season's first storm, Andres, developed on May 31, while its last, Jimena, dissipated on November 18. In early June, Andres moved onshore Mexico as a minimal hurricane, while in late October, Ignacio struck the coastline as a tropical depression. Impacts from those storms were minimal, as were the effects of the preponderance of systems during the season. No casualties or damage were reported onshore, but two fishermen drowned offshore.

== Systems ==
Least intense Pacific hurricane seasons
Rank	Season	ACE value
1	1977	22.3
2	2010	51.2
3	2007	51.6
4	1996	53.9
5	2003	56.6
6	1979	57.4
7	2004	71.1
8	1981	72.8
9	2013	74.8
10	2020	77.3

=== Hurricane Andres ===
- Category 2 hurricane (SSHWS)
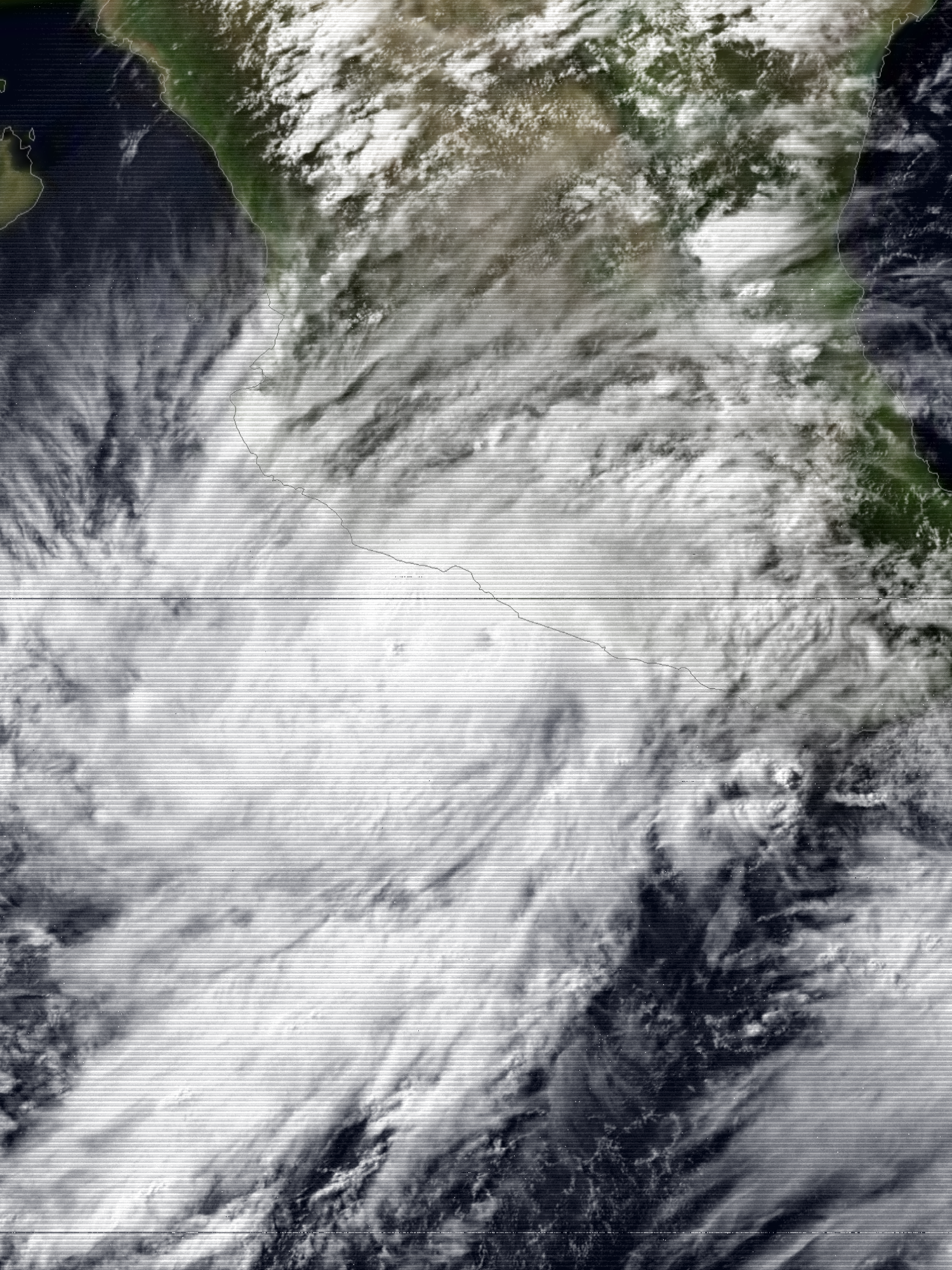
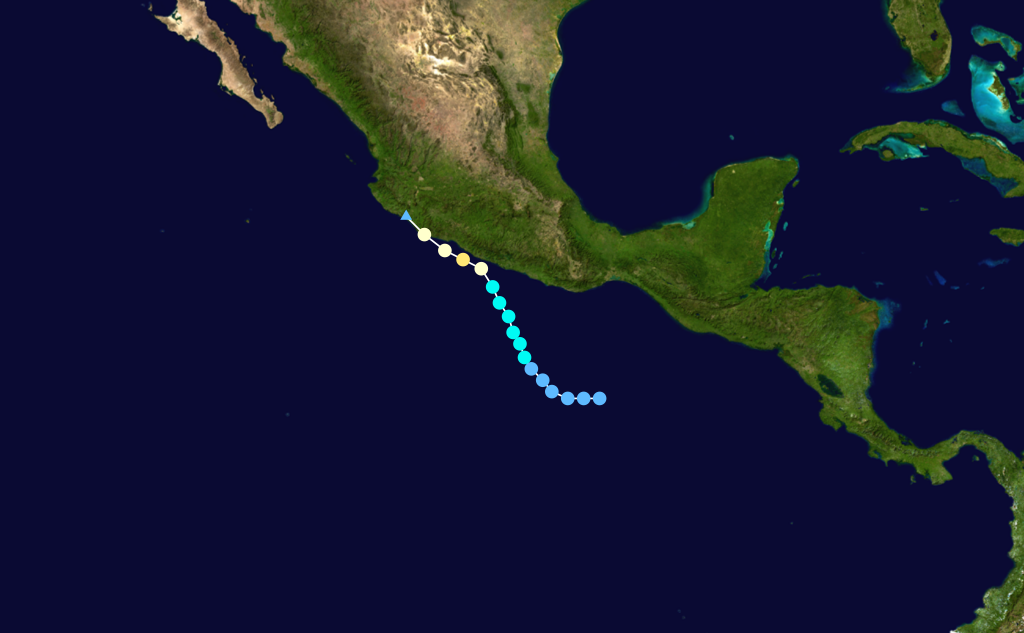
- Duration: May 31 – June 4
- Peak intensity: 100 mph (155 km/h) (1-min); ≤992 mbar (hPa)

A tropical disturbance developed south of the Gulf of Tehuantepec early on May 31, and became a tropical depression at 18:00 UTC that day. The system coalesced into Tropical Storm Andres by 06:00 UTC on June 2 as it curved from west to north-northwest. It then became the season's first hurricane around 18:00 UTC on June 3. Later that day, forecasters observed a small eye on visible satellite imagery. One of many ships encountered the storm after this time, measuring an inner core 21 miles (34 km) in radius. The cyclone attained its peak as a Category 2 hurricane with winds of 100 mph (160 km/h) around 00:00 UTC on June 4. Andres veered northwest and began to weaken, striking the coastline as a minimal hurricane about 105 miles (169 km) east of Manzanillo at 13:00 UTC. The system transitioned into an extratropical cyclone five hours later.

All flights inbound to Acapulco, Guerrero, were canceled on June 3 but resumed the next day following Andres' passage. Torrential rainfall triggered flooding which inundated homes and floated cars left on streets. High winds also downed power lines, leaving many residents without electricity. Offshore, two fishermen were killed after their boat capsized amidst rough seas. The crew of a cargo ship rescued four people from the luxury yacht Florida II, which sank.

=== Tropical Storm Blanca ===
- Tropical storm (SSHWS)
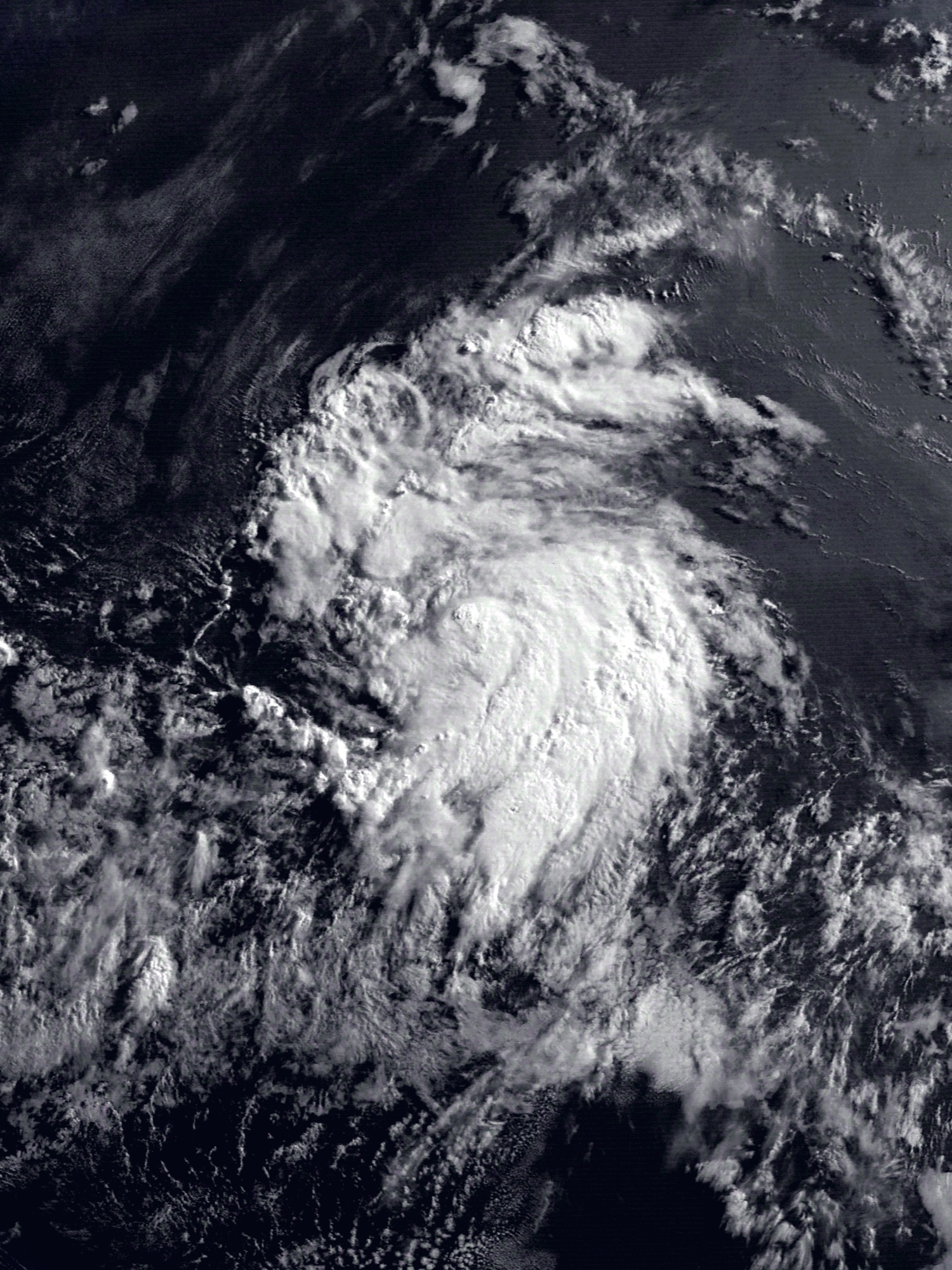
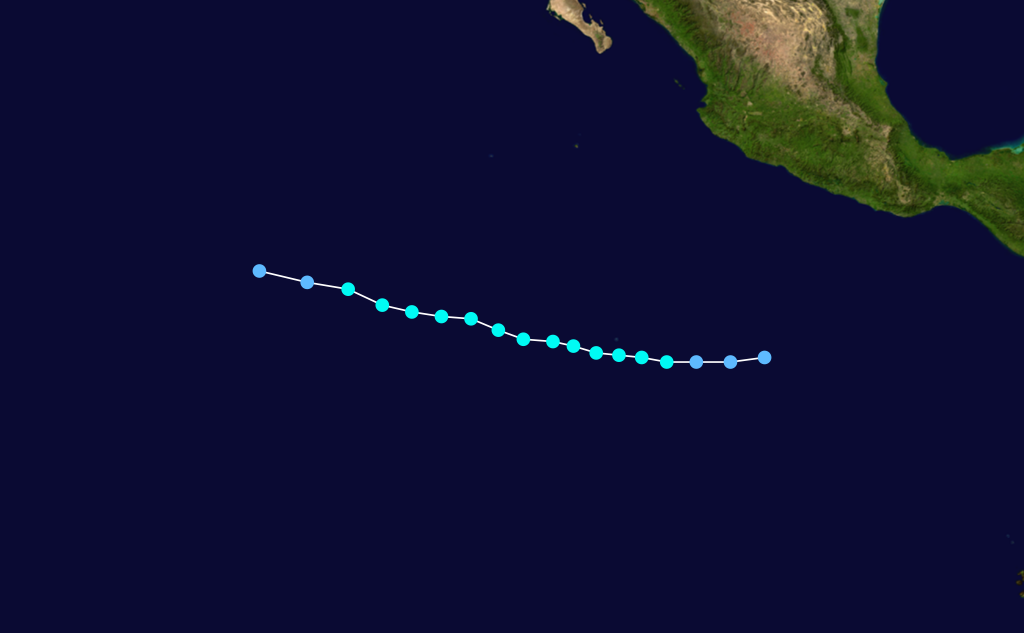
- Duration: June 21 – June 25
- Peak intensity: 50 mph (85 km/h) (1-min);

A westward-moving tropical disturbance crossed Costa Rica and Panama into the East Pacific on June 17. The system was slow to organize initially, but developed into a tropical depression by 06:00 UTC on June 21. It further intensified and became Tropical Storm Blanca around 00:00 UTC on June 22. Blanca moved over warm waters and eventually attained peak winds of 50 mph (80 km/h) on June 22–23. The cyclone curved west-northwest and began to weaken, particularly after it encountered colder waters. It dissipated far away from land after 12:00 UTC on June 25.

=== Tropical Storm Carlos ===
- Tropical storm (SSHWS)
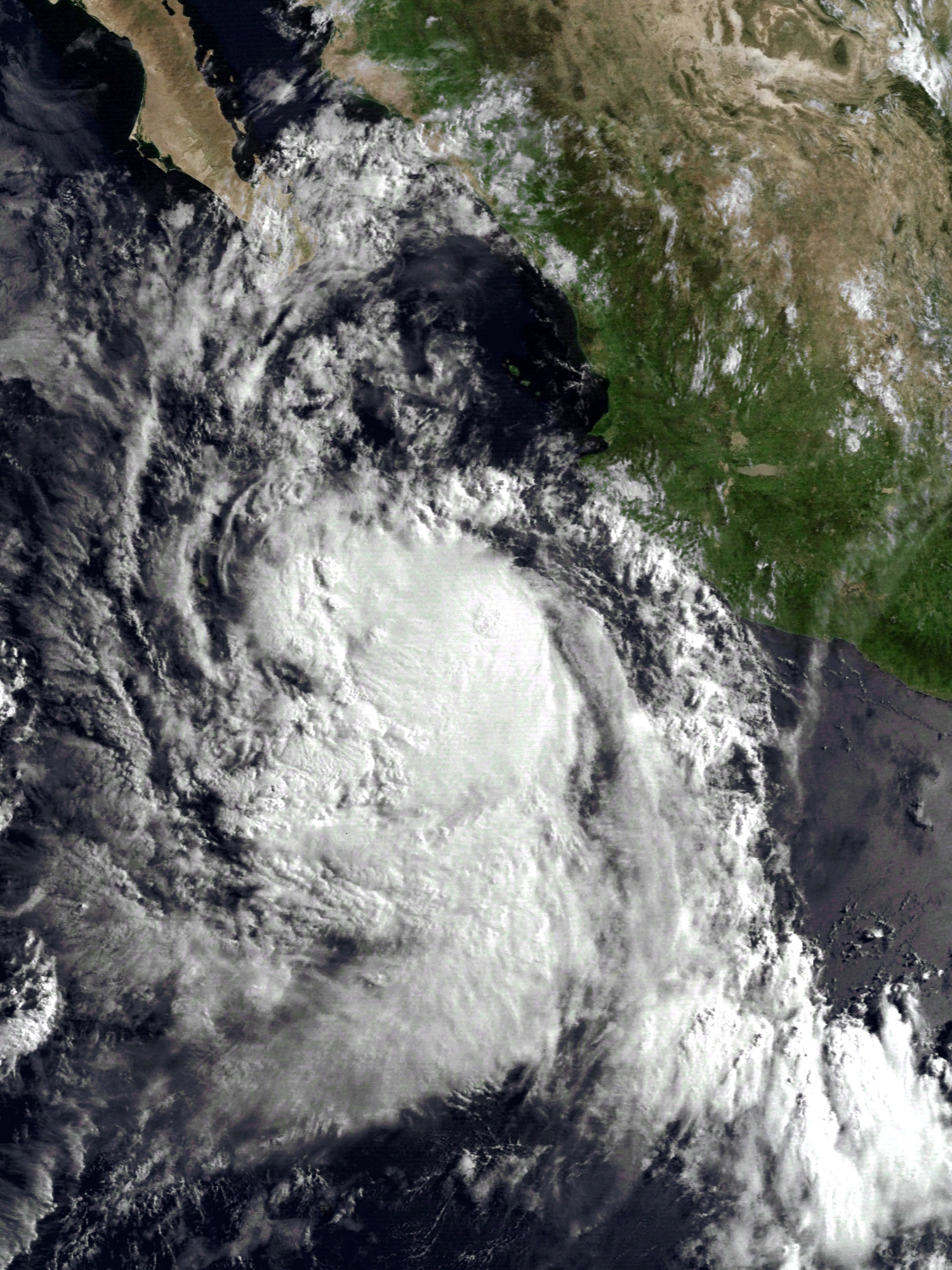
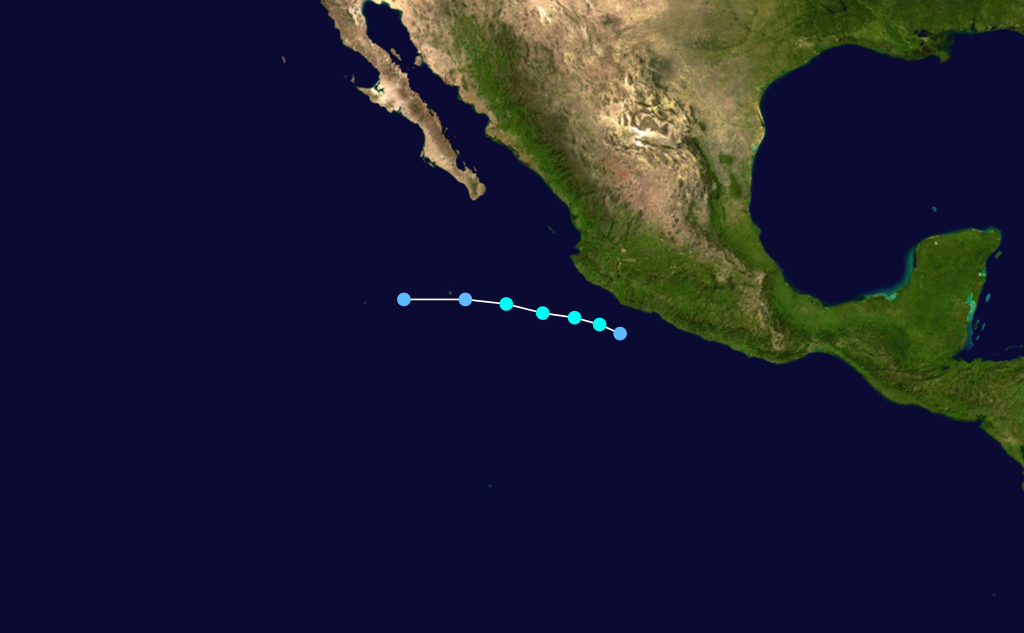
- Duration: July 14 – July 16
- Peak intensity: 50 mph (85 km/h) (1-min);

A tropical disturbance formed in the Gulf of Tehuantepec on July 11 and developed into a tropical depression around 18:00 UTC on July 14. The cyclone moved swiftly westward, becoming Tropical Storm Carlos within six hours and reaching peak winds of 50 mph (80 km/h) on July 15. Carlos passed about 20 miles (32 km) south of Socorro Island, soon crossing into cooler waters and drier air. The cyclone dissipated southwest of Baja California Sur after 06:00 UTC on July 16.

=== Hurricane Dolores ===
- Category 3 hurricane (SSHWS)
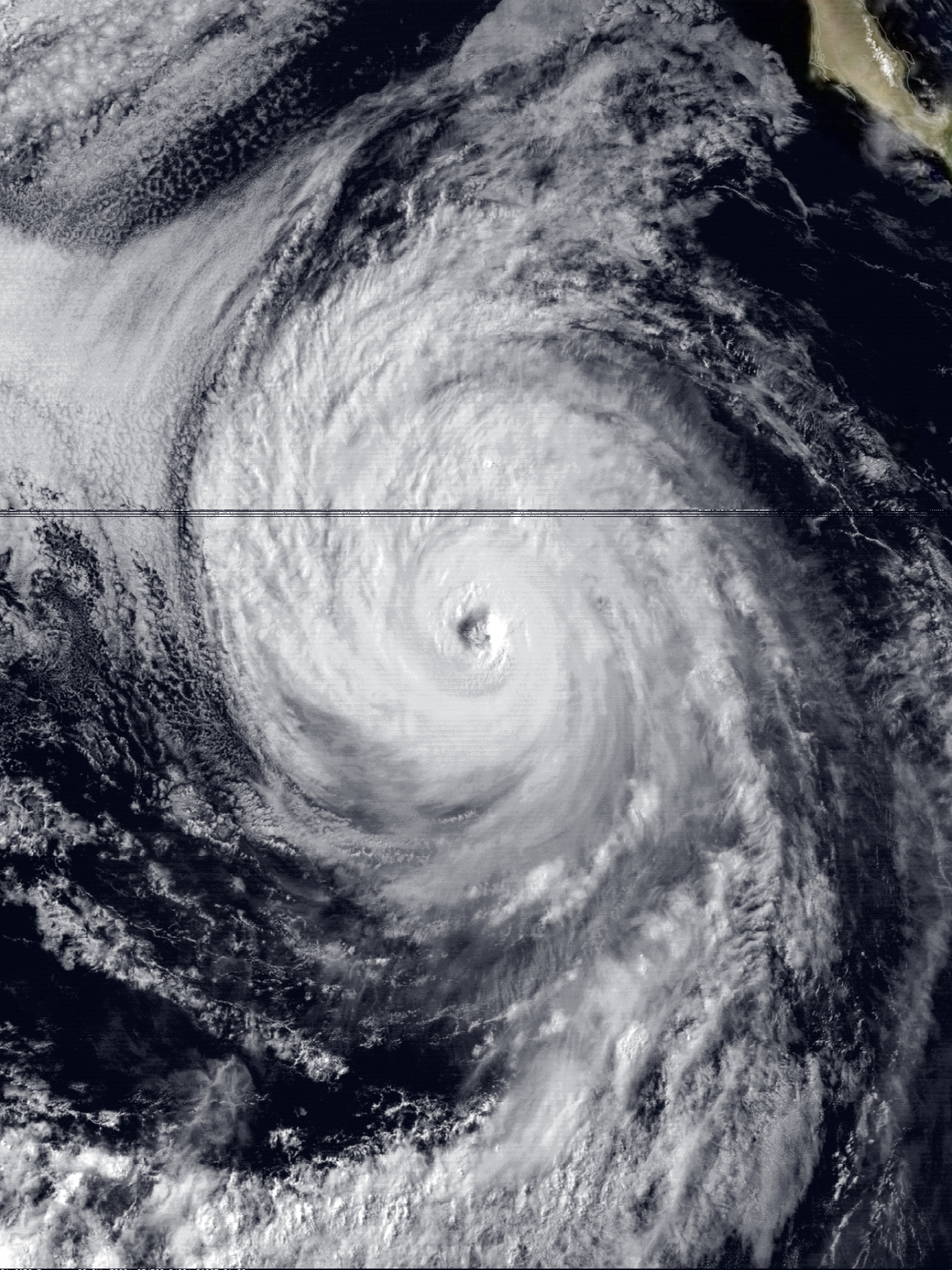
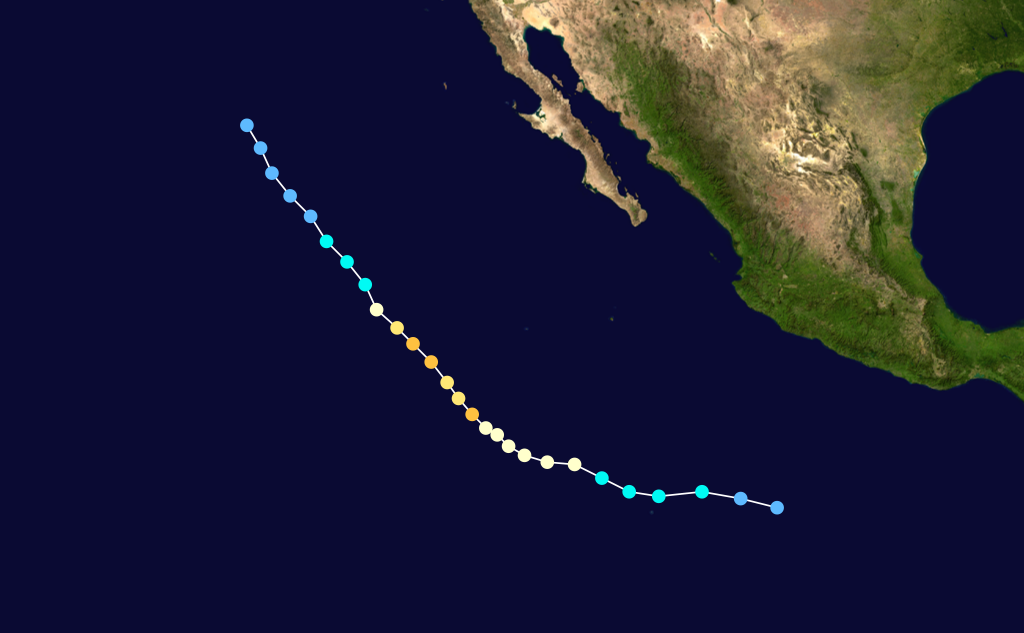
- Duration: July 17 – July 23
- Peak intensity: 120 mph (195 km/h) (1-min);

An area of disturbed weather was observed south of Guatemala on July 14. It developed into a tropical depression around 06:00 UTC on July 17 and became Tropical Storm Dolores twelve hours later. Moving along the south side of an upper-level area of high pressure, the cyclone passed over warm waters which facilitated its continued development. It became a hurricane at 18:00 UTC on July 18 and then entered a period of rapid intensification, which coincided with the formation of a well-defined eye on satellite imagery. Dolores strengthened into the season's first major hurricane around 06:00 UTC on July 20 and, after a brief fluctuation in intensity, attained peak winds of 120 mph (190 km/h) early on July 21. High pressure shifted northeast into northern Mexico, causing Dolores to curve northwest into cooler waters and drier air. The system dissipated well to the west of Baja California after 18:00 UTC on July 23.

=== Hurricane Enrique ===
- Category 4 hurricane (SSHWS)
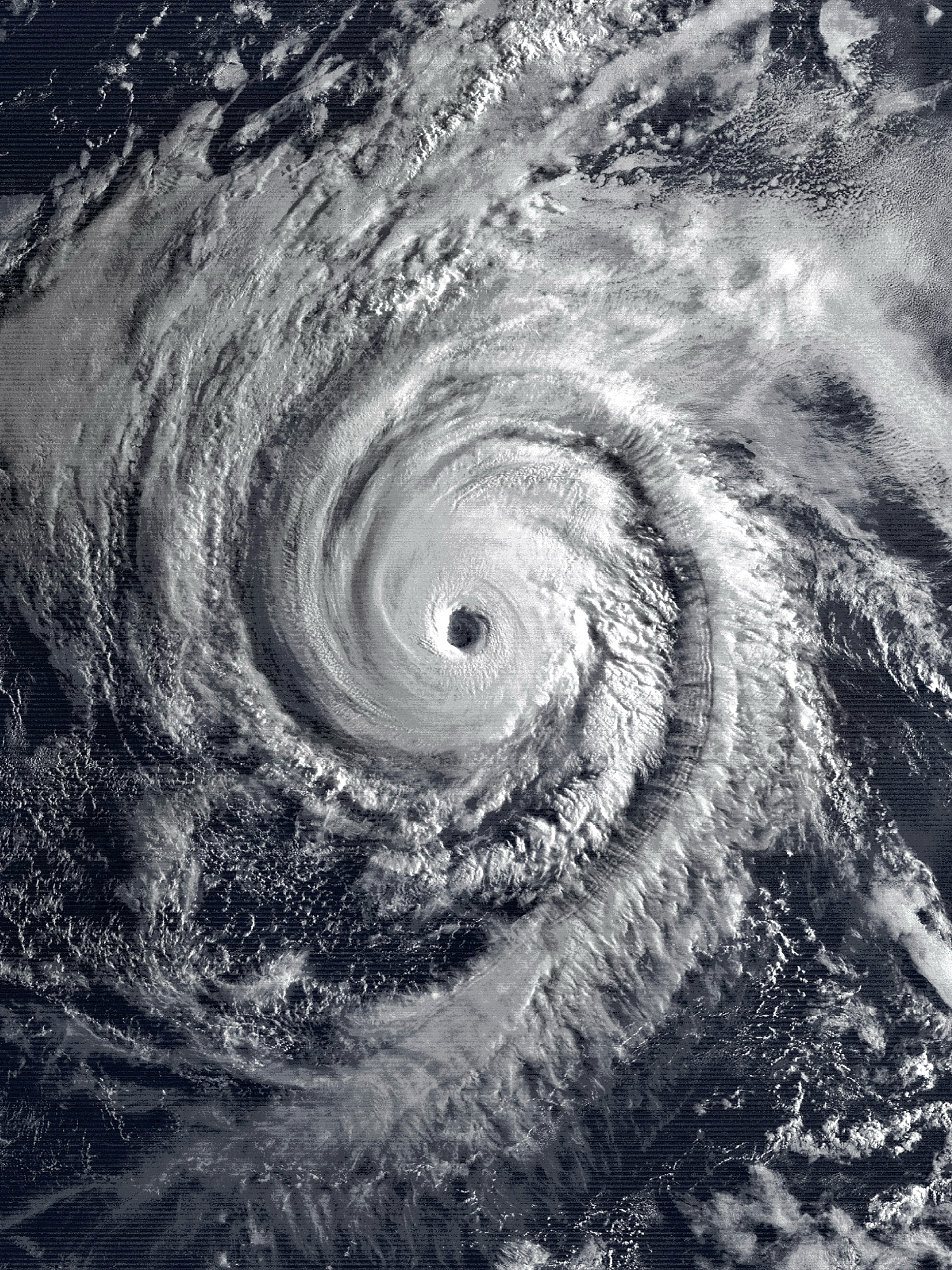
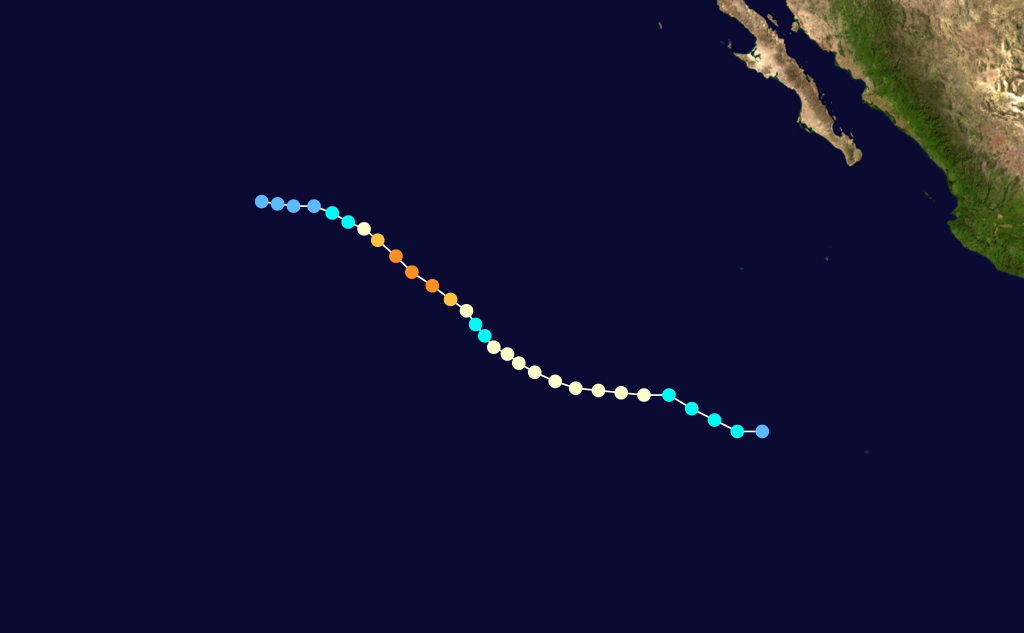
- Duration: August 17 – August 24
- Peak intensity: 145 mph (230 km/h) (1-min);

After a nearly month-long dearth in tropical-cyclone activity, a new tropical depression formed over the open East Pacific around 18:00 UTC on August 17. It moved west over very warm waters, intensifying into Tropical Storm Enrique six hours after formation, and into a hurricane by 00:00 UTC on August 19. After maintaining that strength for a few days, the cyclone encountered dry air and slightly cooler waters, which caused it to weaken to a tropical storm. Enrique soon moved into a more conducive environment again, however, and began rapid intensification. Over a 24-hour period ending at 18:00 UTC on August 22, the storm's maximum winds increased from 70 mph (110 km/h) to a peak of 145 mph (233 km/h), ranking as a Category 4 hurricane. Enrique moved toward the northwest, and that trajectory brought the storm over cold waters once again, resulting in rapid weakening. The system dissipated after 18:00 UTC on August 24.

=== Hurricane Fefa ===
- Category 3 hurricane (SSHWS)
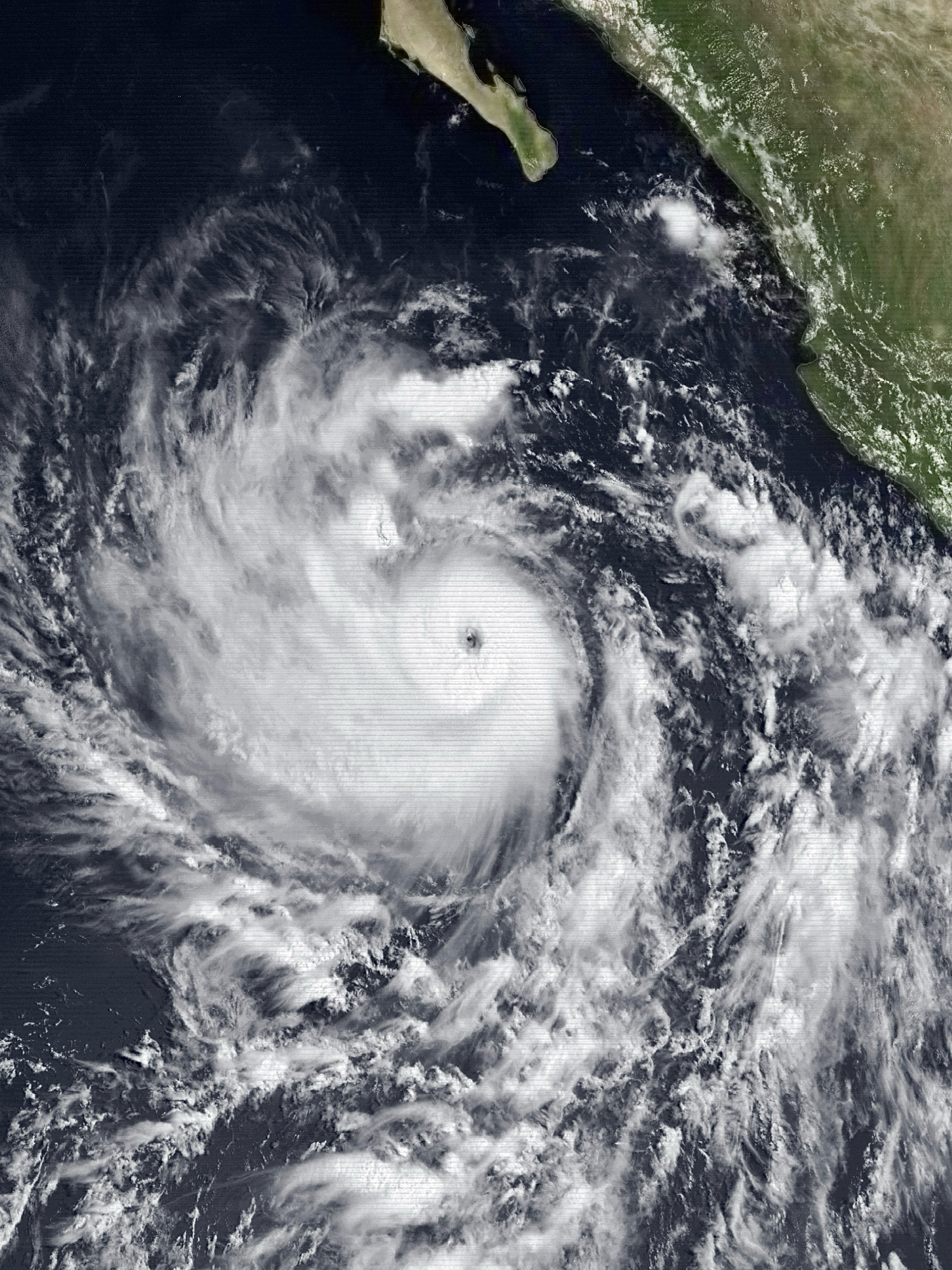
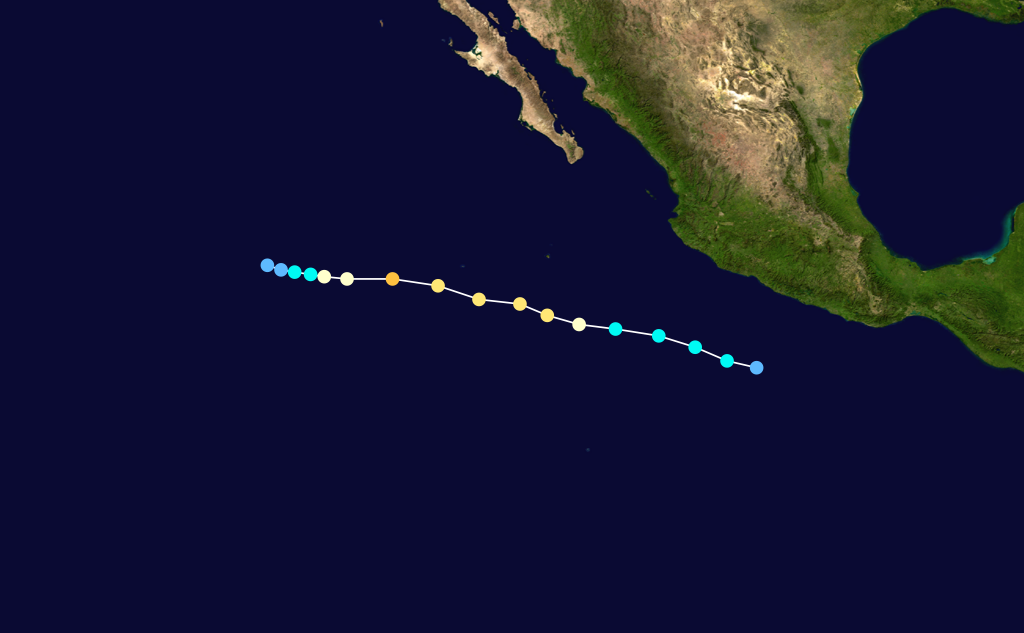
- Duration: August 21 – August 25
- Peak intensity: 115 mph (185 km/h) (1-min);

A tropical disturbance developed south-southeast of Acapulco on August 19. Positioned on the south side of upper-level ridging, the system moved swiftly west-northwest and organized into a tropical depression around 00:00 UTC on August 21. Continued development over very warm waters allowed the depression to become Tropical Storm Fefa within six hours, which then intensified into a hurricane by 06:00 UTC on August 22. Later that day, Fefa developed a well-defined eye. It attained its peak as a Category 3 hurricane with winds of 115 mph (185 km/h) at 12:00 UTC on August 23. A persistent, rapid west-northwest track brought Fefa over increasingly cool waters, which caused weakening. The system dissipated over the open East Pacific after 00:00 UTC on August 25.

=== Hurricane Guillermo ===
- Category 1 hurricane (SSHWS)
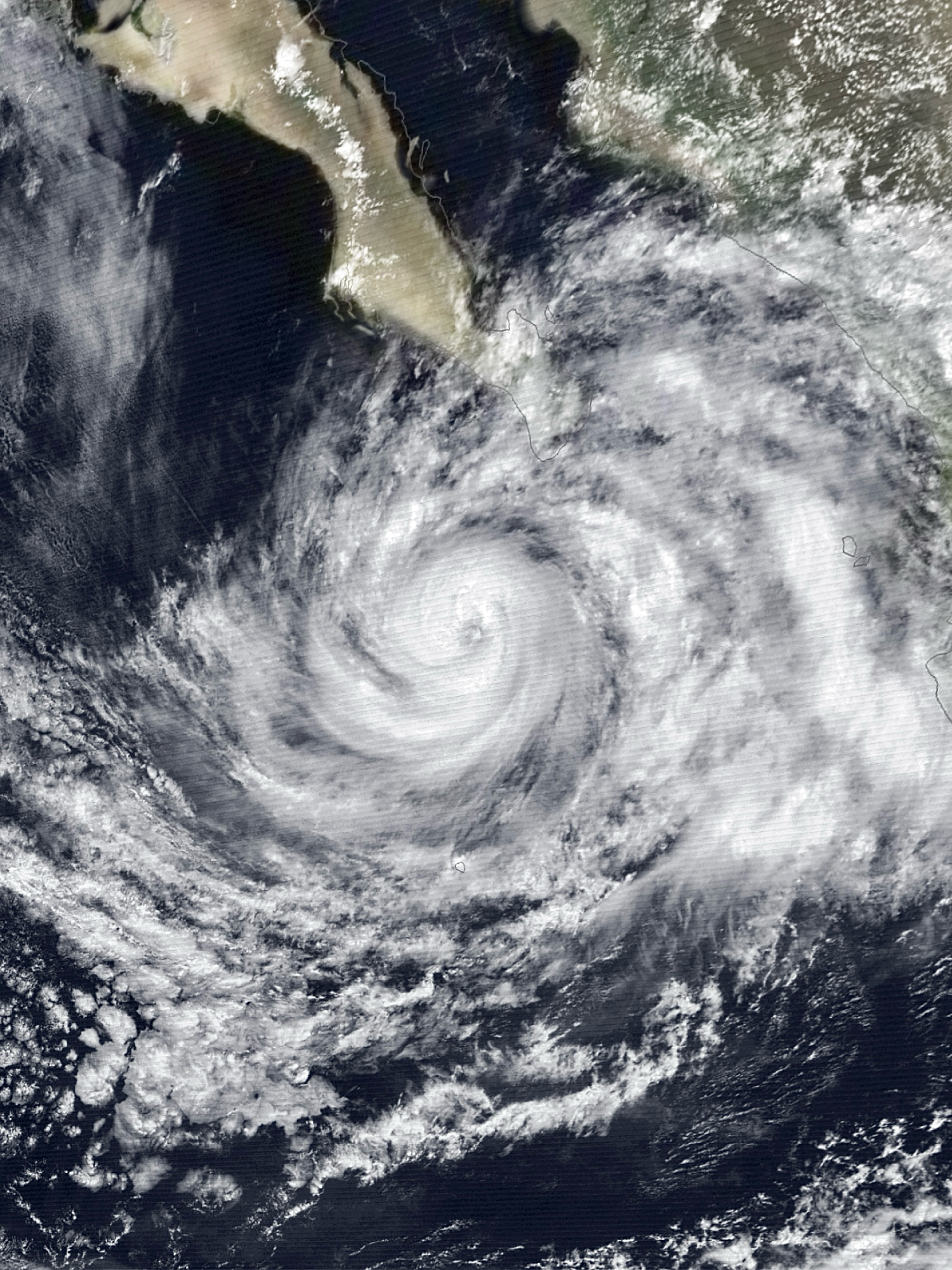
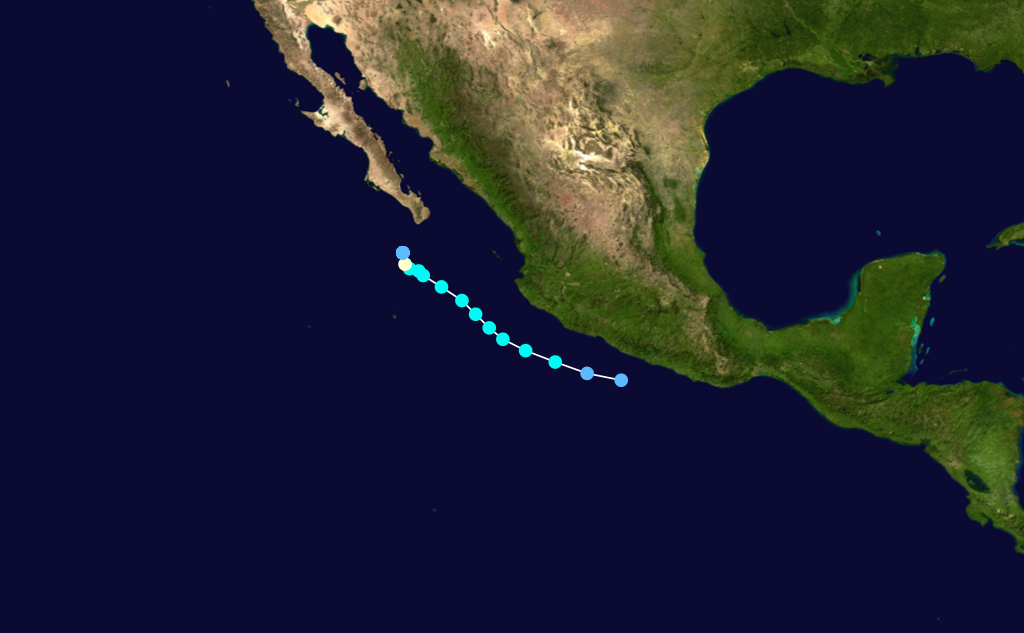
- Duration: September 8 – September 13
- Peak intensity: 75 mph (120 km/h) (1-min); ≤994 mbar (hPa)

An area of disturbed weather formed south of the Gulf of Tehuantepec on September 7. It organized into a tropical depression around 18:00 UTC on September 8 and intensified into Tropical Storm Guillermo twelve hours later. Flow around the southwest side of upper-level ridging directed the storm to curve northwestward, while the system's track over warm waters allowed it to intensify. It became a hurricane with peak winds of 75 mph (121 km/h) around 18:00 UTC on September 11. Guillermo decelerated over cooler waters south of Baja California, ultimately dissipating after 12:00 UTC on September 13.

=== Tropical Storm Hilda ===
- Tropical storm (SSHWS)
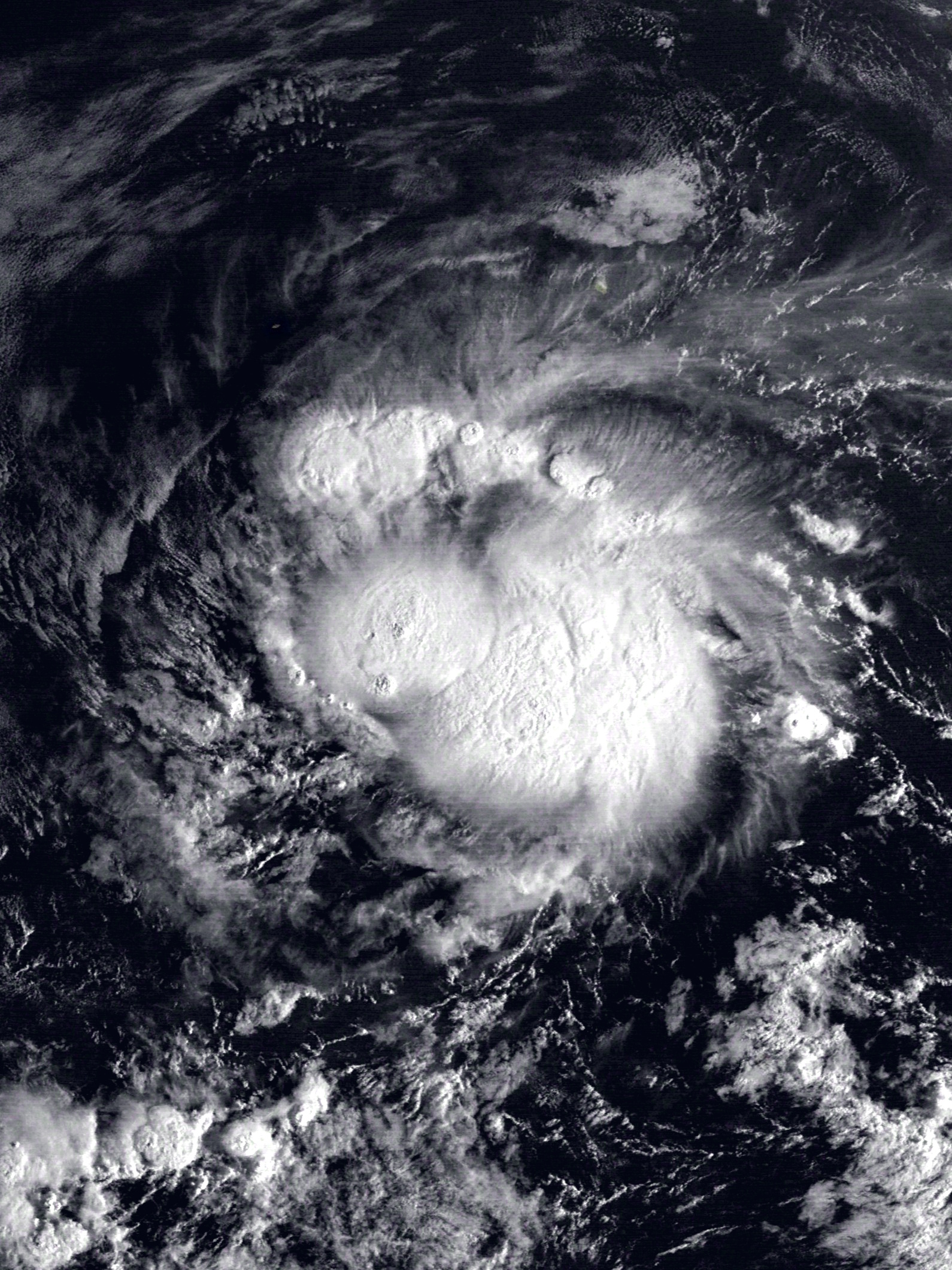
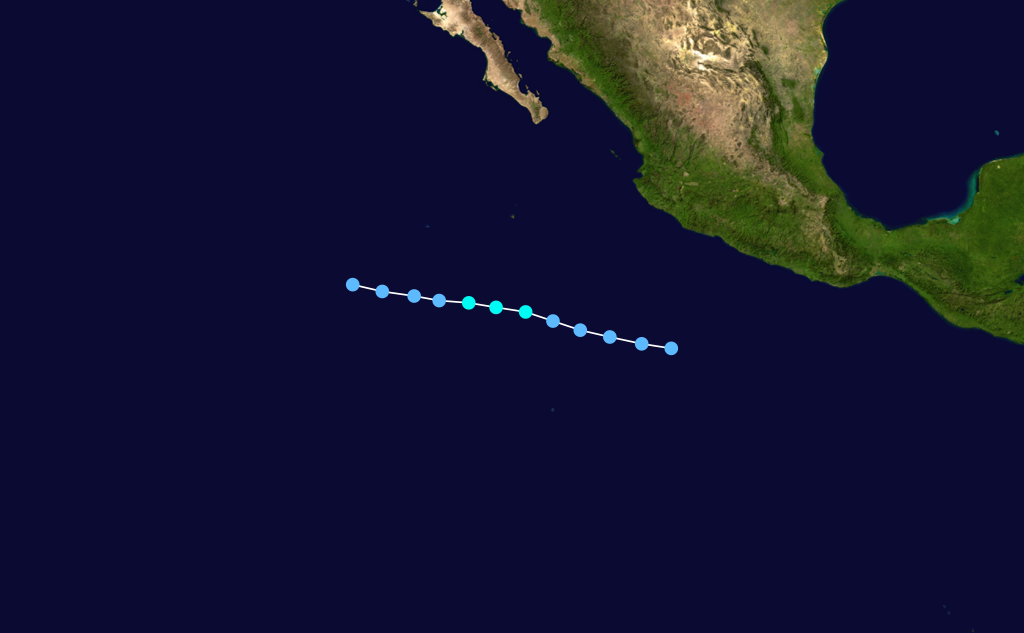
- Duration: October 4 – October 6
- Peak intensity: 45 mph (75 km/h) (1-min); ≤994 mbar (hPa)

On October 1, an area of disturbed weather developed south of Guatemala. It moved west, coalescing into a tropical depression by 00:00 UTC on October 4. After a short pause in intensification, the depression became Tropical Storm Hilda around 06:00 UTC on October 5, at which time it reached peak winds of 45 mph (72 km/h). A westward track brought the cyclone over cooler waters, and the brief system dissipated over the open East Pacific after 18:00 UTC on October 6.

=== Hurricane Ignacio ===
- Category 4 hurricane (SSHWS)
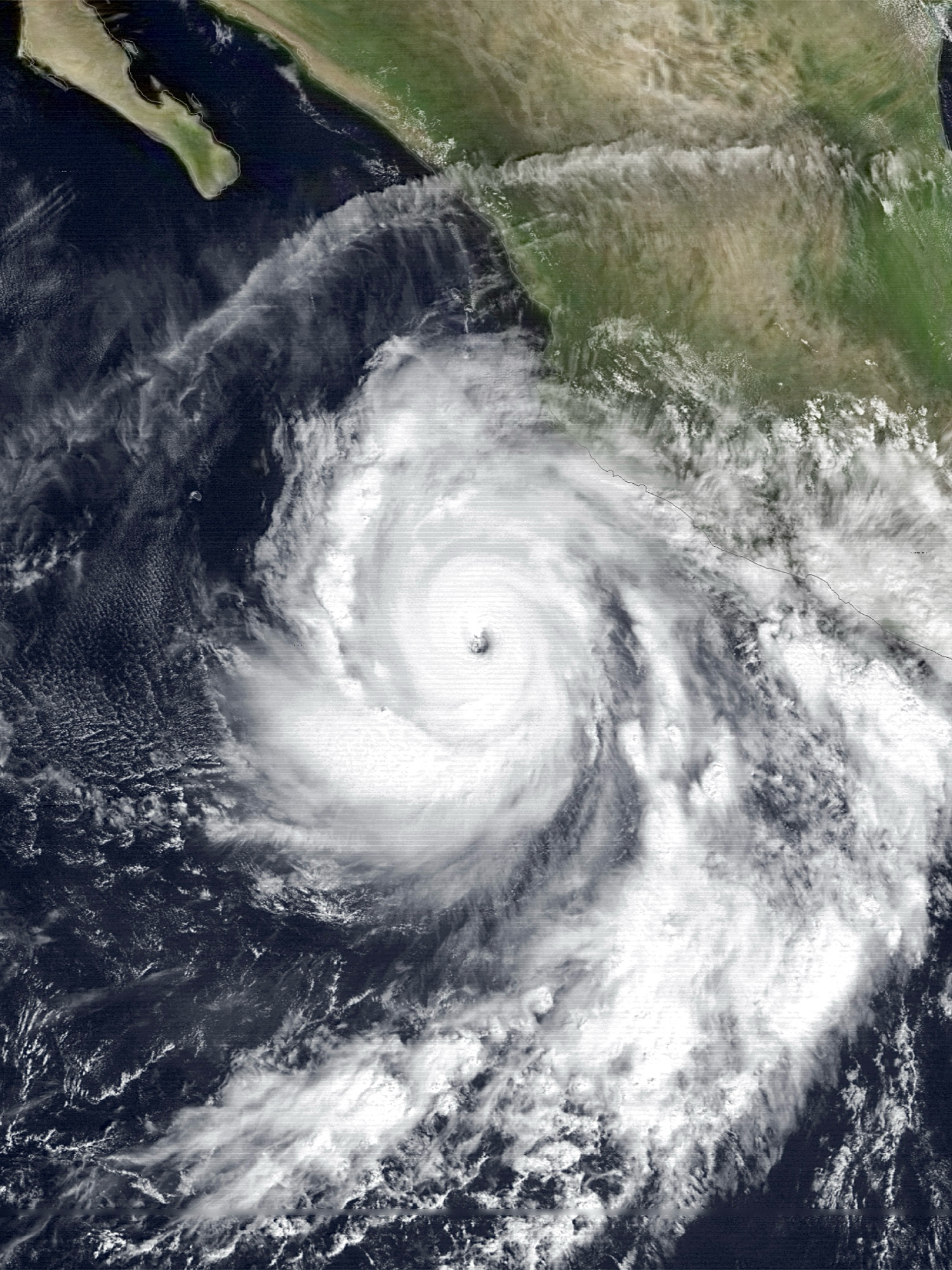
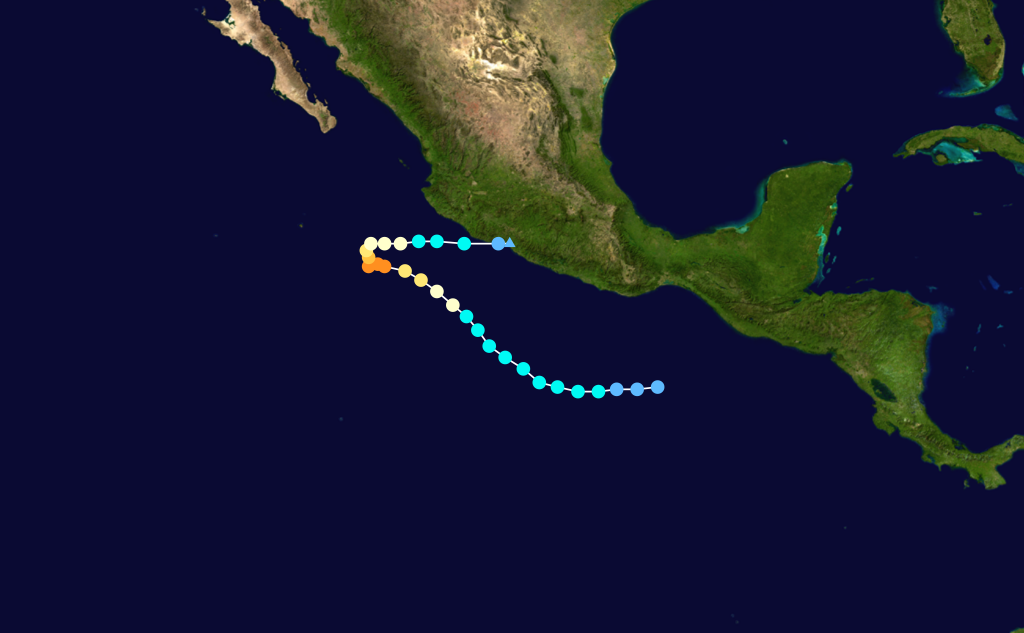
- Duration: October 23 – October 30
- Peak intensity: 145 mph (230 km/h) (1-min); 938 mbar (hPa)

Over two weeks after the dissipation of Hilda, a new tropical disturbance formed southwest of Guatemala on October 22. It tracked steadily westward, becoming a tropical depression around 18:00 UTC on October 23 and Tropical Storm Ignacio at 12:00 UTC the next day. A curve toward the northwest brought the cyclone over progressively warmer waters, and it reached hurricane intensity around 18:00 UTC on October 26. Ignacio soon thereafter began a period of rapid intensification, vaulting from Category 2 to Category 4 intensity within six hours. A United States Air Force reconnaissance plane investigated the powerful storm at 18:00 UTC on October 27, finding peak winds of 145 mph (233 km/h) – tied with Enrique as the strongest of the season – as well as a 25-mile (35-km) diameter eye covered only by broken low-level clouds.

Ignacio turned north and then veered sharply east, entering colder waters. Subsequent reconnaissance of the storm found various changes to its internal structure, including a pinhole eye down to 6 miles (9.7 km) in diameter before it ultimately became ill-defined. Ignacio accelerated toward the Mexico coastline, and around 12:00 UTC on October 30 struck about 160 miles (260 km) east-southeast of Manzanillo, Colima, with much-weakened winds of 35 mph (56 km/h). It transitioned into an extratropical cyclone six hours later, then dissipated over the Yucatán Peninsula the next day.

=== Tropical Storm Jimena ===
- Tropical storm (SSHWS)
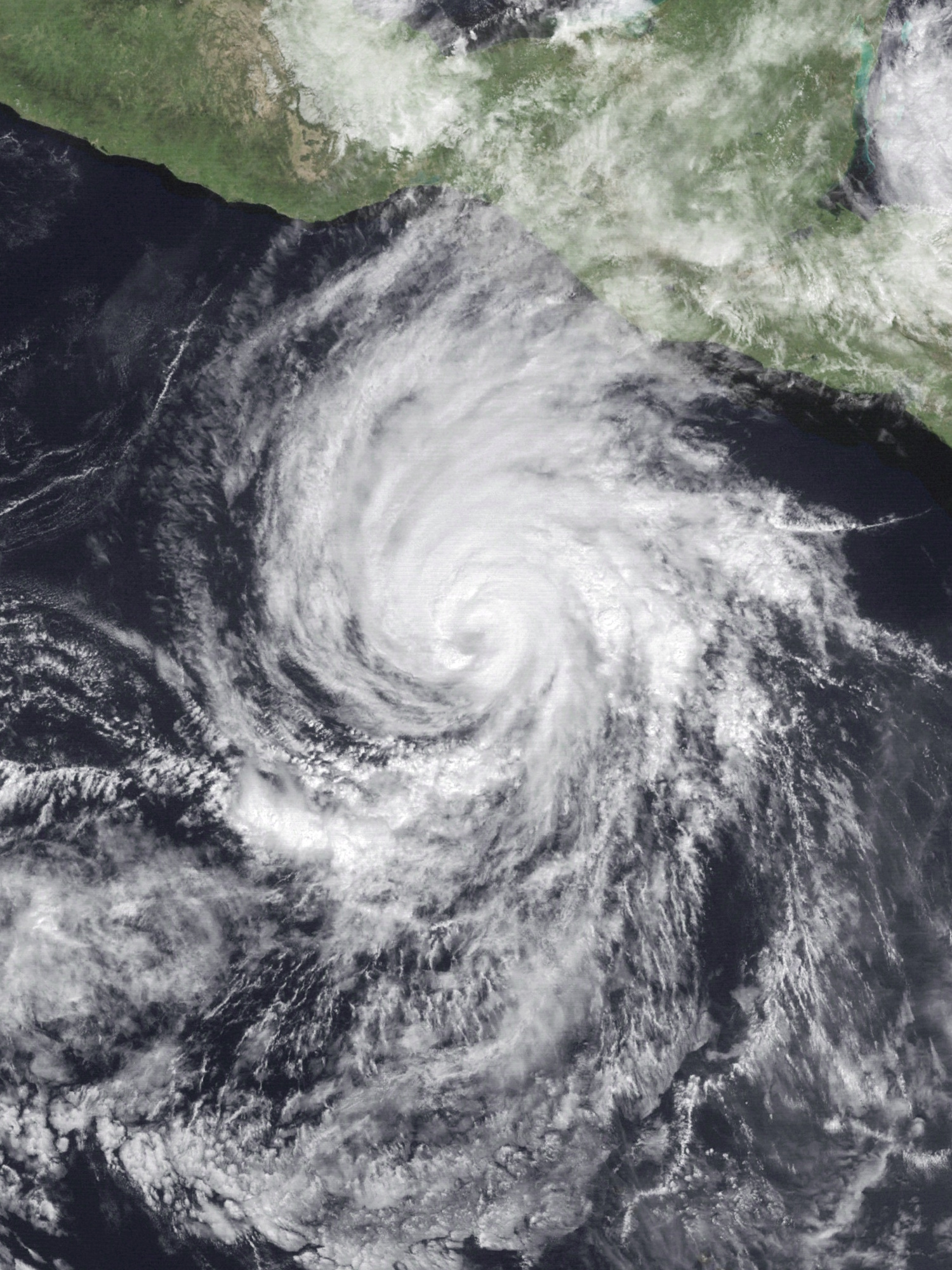
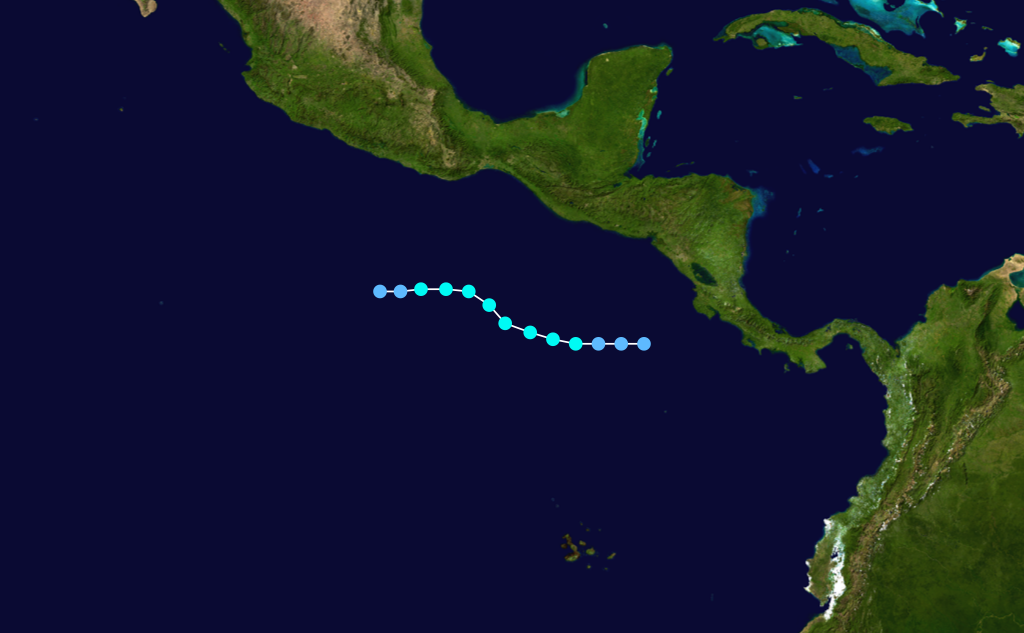
- Duration: November 15 – November 18
- Peak intensity: 65 mph (100 km/h) (1-min);

The final storm of the 1979 season began as a tropical disturbance south of Panama on November 13. The system moved generally westward and organized into a tropical depression around 06:00 UTC on November 15. Warm waters aided in the depression's development, and it became Tropical Storm Jimena by 00:00 UTC on November 16. The cyclone's winds peaked at 65 mph (105 km/h) around 18:00 UTC that day. Afterwards, cold and dry northerly winds flowing across the Gulf of Tehuantepec began to affect Jimena, causing it to weaken. The system's center dissipated after 06:00 UTC on November 18, though its remnants were evident on satellite imagery for another three days.

=== Other systems ===
Several unofficial tropical depressions accompanied the documented cyclones in 1979. Shortly before the formation of Andres, a tropical depression developed south of Manzanillo on May 31. It curved northwest into cooler waters and dissipated on June 1. Another tropical depression was identified north of Carlos on July 16. It weakened over cold waters almost immediately, however, dissipating around 12:00 UTC that day just offshore Baja California Sur. The last documented tropical depression formed on September 4 south of the Gulf of the Tehuantepec. The system moved onshore about 165 miles (266 km) east-southeast of Acapulco at 18:00 UTC that day. It dissipated rapidly once inland.

== Storm names ==
The following list of names was used for named storms that formed in the North Pacific Ocean east of 140°W in 1979. Most of these names were used for the first time, except for Blanca and Dolores, which were previously used in the old four-year lists. No names were retired from the list following the season, and it was used again for the 1985 season.

- Andres
- Blanca
- Carlos
- Dolores
- Enrique
- Fefa
- Guillermo
- Hilda
- Ignacio
- Jimena
- Kevin (unused)
- Linda (unused)
- Marty (unused)
- Nora (unused)
- Olaf (unused)
- Pauline (unused)
- Rick (unused)
- Sandra (unused)
- Terry (unused)
- Vivian (unused)
- Waldo (unused)

Had a named storm formed in the North Pacific between 140°W and the International Date Line in 1979 it would have been assigned a name from the west Pacific's typhoon name list by the Joint Typhoon Warning Center on Guam.

== Season effects ==
This is a table of all of the storms that formed in the 1979 Pacific hurricane season. It includes their name, duration, peak classification and intensities, areas affected, damage, and death totals. Deaths in parentheses are additional and indirect (an example of an indirect death would be a traffic accident), but were still related to that storm. Damage and deaths include totals while the storm was extratropical, a wave, or a low, and all of the damage figures are in 1979 USD.

Saffir–Simpson scale
TD	TS	C1	C2	C3	C4	C5

1979 Pacific hurricane season statistics
Storm name	Dates active	Storm category at peak intensity	Max 1-min wind mph (km/h)	Min. press. (mbar)	Areas affected	Damage (US$)	Deaths	Ref(s).
Andres	May 31–June 4	Category 2 hurricane	100 (155)	≤992	Mexico	None	2	
Blanca	June 21–25	Tropical storm	50 (85)	Unknown	None	None	None	
Carlos	July 14–16	Tropical storm	50 (85)	Unknown	None	None	None	
Dolores	July 17–23	Category 3 hurricane	120 (195)	Unknown	None	None	None	
Enrique	August 17–24	Category 4 hurricane	145 (230)	Unknown	None	None	None	
Fefa	August 21–25	Category 3 hurricane	115 (185)	Unknown	None	None	None	
Guillermo	September 8–13	Category 1 hurricane	75 (120)	≤994	None	None	None	
Hilda	October 4–6	Tropical storm	45 (75)	≤994	None	None	None	
Ignacio	October 23–30	Category 4 hurricane	145 (230)	938	Mexico	None	None	
Jimena	November 15–18	Tropical storm	65 (100)	Unknown	None	None	None	
Season aggregates
10 systems	May 31–November 18		145 (230)	938		None	2	

== See also ==
- List of Pacific hurricanes
- Pacific hurricane season
- 1979 Atlantic hurricane season
- 1979 Pacific typhoon season
- 1979 North Indian Ocean cyclone season
- Southern Hemisphere tropical cyclone seasons: 1978–79, 1979–80
