= Tropical Storm Claudette (1979) =

Atlantic tropical storm in 1979

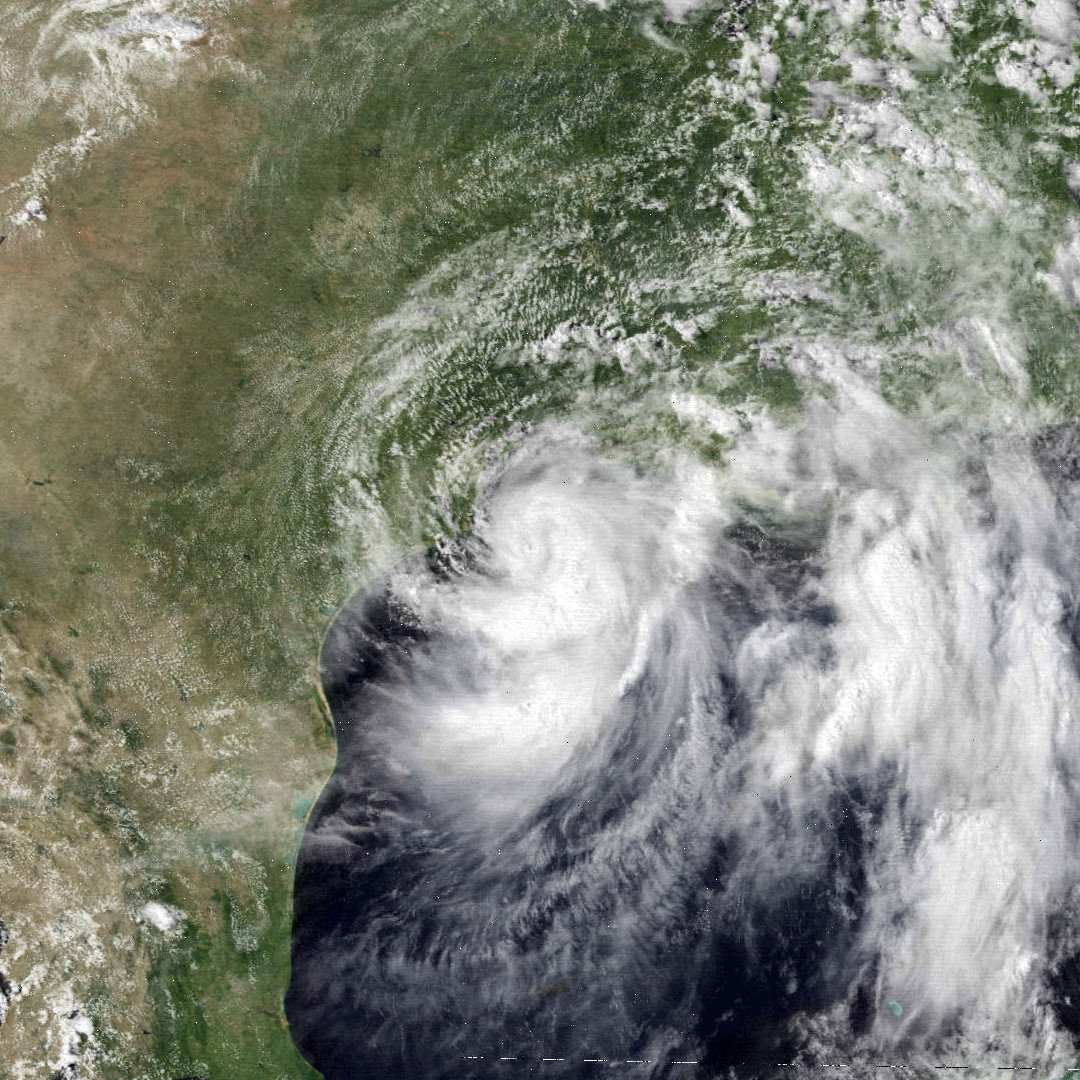
- Tropical Storm Claudette making landfall along the Texas-Louisiana border on July 24

Meteorological history
- Formed: July 16, 1979
- Dissipated: July 29, 1979

Tropical storm
- 1-minute sustained (SSHWS/NWS)
- Highest winds: 50 mph (85 km/h)
- Lowest pressure: 997 mbar (hPa); 29.44 inHg

Overall effects
- Fatalities: 2 direct, 6 indirect
- Damage: $750 million (1979 USD)
- Areas affected: Leeward Islands, Puerto Rico, Dominican Republic, Haiti, Cuba, Texas, Louisiana, Missouri, Ohio Valley, Kentucky, Virginia
- IBTrACS
- Part of the 1979 Atlantic hurricane season

Tropical Storm Claudette was the fourth-wettest tropical cyclone on record in the contiguous United States, leading to significant flooding in southeast Texas and western Louisiana in July 1979. The eighth tropical cyclone and third named storm of the annual hurricane season, Claudette developed from a tropical wave located east of the Windward Islands on July 16. It gradually strengthened and upgraded to Tropical Storm Claudette on July 17 before crossing the northern Leeward Islands later that day. As Claudette neared landfall in Puerto Rico early on July 18, upper-level winds weakened it back to a tropical depression. Claudette remained disorganized and the National Hurricane Center operationally reported that it degenerated back into a tropical wave after crossing Puerto Rico. Late on July 18, the depression struck Dominican Republic and emerged into the Caribbean Sea on the following day. Claudette struck western Cuba on July 21, shortly before reaching the Gulf of Mexico. By July 23, Claudette regained tropical storm intensity and turned northward. The cyclone made landfall near the Texas-Louisiana stateline late on July 23 as a moderately strong tropical storm. It weakened slowly and drifted over land, lasting until dissipation over West Virginia on July 29.

In the Lesser Antilles, the storm brought heavy rainfall and gusty winds to several islands. Minor flooding occurred in Guadeloupe and Saint Croix. Rainfall exceeding 10 in (250 mm) in some areas of Puerto Rico led to widespread agricultural damage, flooded homes and streets, and one fatality; losses were estimated at $750,000 (1979 USD). Despite its passage over Hispaniola and Cuba, impact in both regions is unknown. Claudette brought record-breaking rainfall to eastern Texas. In Alvin, 42 in (1,100 mm) of rain fell in one day, which at one point was the record 24‑hour precipitation amount for any location in the United States. Consequently, about 15,000 homes and hundreds of businesses were damaged in Greater Houston and 1 person died in Beaumont. Five other deaths occurred near Centerville after a truck crashed into a bus and pushed the latter into a swollen creek. Significant coastal flooding and up to 15 in (380 mm) of precipitation was reported in Louisiana. Later, Claudette brought heavy rains and flooding to parts of the Midwestern United States, especially Indiana, damaging several hundreds of homes, killing one person, and causing about $50 million in damage. Overall, Claudette was responsible for at least eight deaths and $750 million (1979 USD) in damage.

== Meteorological history ==
Map plotting the storm's track and intensity, according to the Saffir–Simpson scale Map key Saffir–Simpson scale Tropical depression (≤38 mph, ≤62 km/h) Tropical storm (39–73 mph, 63–118 km/h) Category 1 (74–95 mph, 119–153 km/h) Category 2 (96–110 mph, 154–177 km/h) Category 3 (111–129 mph, 178–208 km/h) Category 4 (130–156 mph, 209–251 km/h) Category 5 (≥157 mph, ≥252 km/h) Unknown Storm type Tropical cyclone Subtropical cyclone Extratropical cyclone, remnant low, tropical disturbance, or monsoon depression

A tropical wave, the strongest of the season at mid-tropospheric levels, emerged into the Atlantic in the second week of July. In Dakar, Senegal, winds were as high as 100 mph (155 km/h) in the 550 mbar (16 inHg) level of the atmosphere. The wave tracked westward and slowly organized. It is estimated that a tropical depression developed after a surface circulation became evident at 1200 UTC on July 16. Four hours later, the National Hurricane Center initiated advisories on Tropical Depression Five, which was centered about 400 miles (640 km) east of Guadeloupe. The depression moved west-northwestward and approached the northern Lesser Antilles. On July 17, an Air Force reconnaissance aircraft flight reported sustained winds of 52 mph (84 km/h). As a result, the depression was upgraded to Tropical Storm Claudette later that day.

As the storm moved westward, it encountered wind shear, weakening it back to depression status when it hit Puerto Rico. Claudette moved across islands of Hispaniola and Cuba as a tropical depression before reforming in the Gulf of Mexico on July 21. Fluctuating between tropical depression and tropical storm status, the disorganized storm drifted slowly westward before making landfall along the Texas-Louisiana border on July 24. The storm stalled over Alvin, Texas, on the evening of the 25th. The storm then weakened and continued northeastward through the Ohio Valley before dissipating on July 29.

== Impact ==
Tropical Storm Claudette killed 2 people and left $400 million (1979 USD, $1.1 billion 2005 USD).

=== Eastern Caribbean ===
Claudette as a tropical depression over Puerto Rico on July 18

In Fort-de-France, Martinique, 2.72 inches (69 mm) of rain fell in 24 hours, causing localized flooding. Another total of 1.77 inches (45 mm) was measured at the Martinique Aimé Césaire International Airport. Precipitation amounts between 7 and 8 inches (180 and 200 mm) on Guadeloupe resulted in flooding between Pointe-à-Pitre and Grand Fonds. Only 0.49 inches (12 mm) of rain fell on Saint Barthélemy. Rainfall amounted to 2.3 inches (58 mm) on Antigua and wind gusts reached 52 mph (84 km/h), while precipitation totals reached 1.55 inches (39 mm) and gusts up to 46 mph (74 km/h) were reported on Barbuda. On Saint Kitts, rainfall peaked at 1.5 inches (38 mm) and wind gusts topped at 35 mph (56 km/h).

In the United States Virgin Islands, Claudette dropped 5 inches (130 mm) of rain in less than 12 hours on the island of Saint Croix. Runoff from Blue Mountain caused a normally dry creek bed to overflow, flooding several homes in the Mon Bijou area. Additionally, about 25 families were evacuated in the vicinity of Glynn by the Civil Defense.

Claudette produced up to 10.12 inches (257 mm) of precipitation in Puerto Rico, which was recorded in municipality of Peñuelas. Due to heavy rainfall, about 25 families were evacuated in Quebrada Limón by the Civil Defense. One fatality occurred when an attempted to drive across a swollen creek near Guayanilla. A bridge along the Coayuco River linking Yauco to Quebrada Limón was damaged by the abnormally high water levels of the river. Minor flooding was reported in the Ponce Area was the Río Portugués and Río Bucaná overflowed. Excess rainfall caused the Río Guanajibo to inundate streets to a "considerable" extent in Mayagüez. Widespread agricultural damage was reported, especially in Las Marías, Maricao, Sabana Grande, and San Sebastián. Overall, losses in Puerto Rico amounted to about $750,000 (1979 USD).

=== United States ===
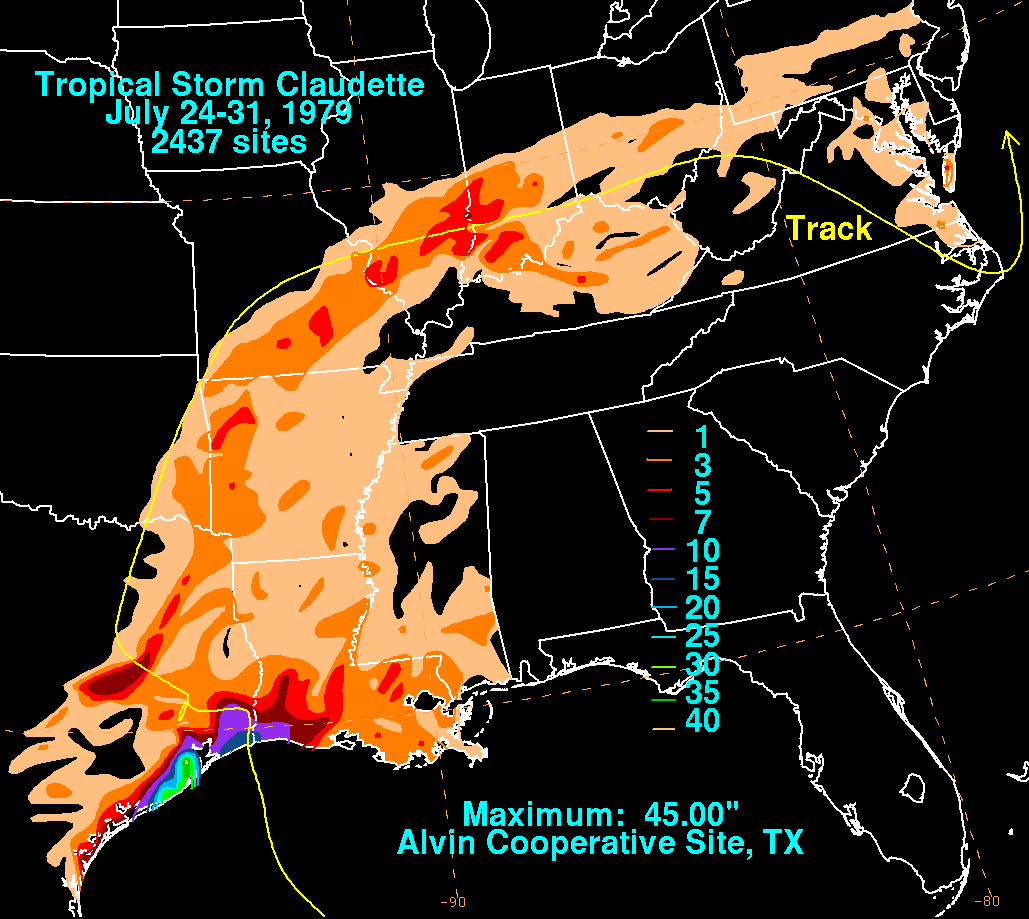
Claudette Rainfall Graphic

==== Texas ====
Claudette produced torrential rains in both Texas and Louisiana when it made landfall. The highest one-day total was reported near Alvin, Texas where 42 inches (1,100 mm) of rain fell. To this day, this is the largest one-day rainfall total ever recorded in North America, and this remained as the highest twenty-four-hour rainfall record for any location in the United States until the 2018 Kauai, Hawaii floods, when 49.69 inches (1,262 mm) of rain fell in 24 hours in Waipā Garden, Kauai, Hawaii. Two other towns also reported rainfall totals exceeding 30 inches (760 mm). Texas was hard hit by Claudette, with flooding reported in southeast Texas with storm totals exceeding 45 inches (1,150 mm) of rainfall in some areas. Many residents had to be rescued from low-lying areas that were flooded.

Several waterways rose significantly in Greater Houston, including Armand Bayou, Chocolate Bayou, Mustang Bayou, Clear Creek, Oyster Creek, Pine Island Bayou, the San Bernard River, Sims Bayou, the Brazos River, and the Trinity River, some more than 1 mi (1.6 km) from their banks. Most of these waterways did not retreat to their banks until July 30. Drainage had partly been prevented by tides at upper Galveston Bay and Sabine Lake ranging from 4 to 5 ft (1.2 to 1.5 m) above average. Floodwaters were estimated by a representative from the state insurance agencies to have impacted an estimated 100,000 homes, schools, churches, and businesses, many suffering substantial damage.

Thousands of miles of road, thousands of telephone outlets, and numerous municipal sewage and water systems were damaged. A number of automobiles were also damaged throughout the Greater Houston area. Approximately 98,000 customers with Southwestern Bell and the General Telephone & Electronics Corporation lost telephone service. Many roads closed or were rendered impassable, including Interstate 10 at Greens Bayou, Interstate 45 south of Almeda and Genoa, and State Highway 6 from Alvin to State Highway 288.

The communities of Alvin, Bevil Oaks, Bridge City, Clear Lake City, Dickinson, Freeport, Friendswood, Groves, Kemah, Lake Jackson, Lakeview, League City, Lumberton, Manvel, Pasadena, Pearland, Port Arthur, Scarsdale, and Seabrook suffered the worst flooding impacts. The small city of Alvin, with the highest rainfall totals, was also the hardest hit with over half of the homes flooded. According to the Houston Post (now part of the Houston Chronicle), the waters were so deep that over 6,000 of its 18,000 residents were forced to flee their homes because of flood waters, with 3,000 requiring rescue from emergency services. As local ABC affiliate Channel 13 reported, nearly half the homes in neighboring towns of Pearland and Manvel and the surrounding countryside were also flooded. The flood waters near Pearland caused a small damn to burst, washing out a part of a local road, FM 518, and creating a channel which was 20 feet deep in some places

In nearby Harris County, approximately 2,500 people also had to fled their homes in as did several thousands others from other parts of Brazoria, Galveston, Fort Bend, Jefferson, and Orange counties. Chambers and Liberty counties reported heavy losses to rice crops, with about 30% of rice crops and roughly 50% of soybeans ruined in the former, for a loss of about $16.9 million. Floodwaters also damaged the electrical cables for a drawbridge linking Kemah and Seabrook along State Highway 146, forcing its span to remain closed until repairs could be completed. In Galveston, the storm washed out dunes in 35 to 40 places, with some gaps as wide as 100 ft (30 m). City officials estimated that repairing these dunes would cost $70,000-$80,000.

Heavy rains fell in some parts of Texas outside the Greater Houston area. Farther east, Jefferson County suffered about $4.2 million in losses to crops, including 20% of soybeans and 10% of rice. One person drowned after their vehicle stalled at an underpass in Beaumont. Flooding inundated low-lying areas of that city and Port Arthur. Power outages were reported in Orange, especially on the city's outskirts, and floodwaters entered some homes. Austin recorded 2 in (51 mm) of rain in another one hour, leading to flash flooding. Milam County observed about 14 in (360 mm) of precipitation near Minerva. In nearby Leon County, a van stopped on State Highway 7 near Centerville after the driver noticed a flooded bridge. However, a truck then crashed into the van, pushing the latter and its occupants into a creek, five of whom drowned. Flash flooding occurred in Smith County, inundating streets, damaging several businesses and a few homes, and washing out bridges in and around Tyler, including on State Highway 14.

==== Louisiana ====
Louisiana received only minor damage from up to 15 inches (380 mm) of rainfall. Tides reached 4 feet (1.2 m) mean sea-level in Lake Charles, while seas were 3.9 feet (1.2 m) in Cameron. As a result, significant coastal flooding occurred. 8 miles (13 km) of Louisiana Highway 82 was either seriously damaged or destroyed, while 14 miles (23 km) of secondary roads were impacted in Cameron Parish. Several boats in the region capsized at the beaches. Seven homes and fishing camps were significantly damaged or destroyed by waves and strong winds in Johnson Bayou. At Constance Beach in Cameron Parish, up to 40 feet (12 m) of sand was eroded along a 1 mile (1.6 km) long section.

==== Elsewhere ====
In Missouri, rainfall exceeded 5 in (130 mm) in some areas. The James River overflowed near Springfield, trapping two elderly women in their home. Heavy rainfall in Farmington backed-up sewer drains, flooded basements, and blew-off large manhole covers. Flood water swept away a car in Ste. Genevieve, washed-out a portion of a sidewalk, and toppled fencing along a baseball field. At the Cover Wagon RV park in Waynesville, flooding damage was approximately $5,000. In Rolla, floodwaters between 3 and 4 ft (0.91 and 1.22 m) forced the evacuation of eight families, and washed out driveways. Cars, sheds, fences, kennels, and butane tanks were swept to other locations. Numerous roads were closed in Christian, Greene, and Taney Counties.

Claudette and a stationary front combined to produce heavy precipitation over southwestern Indiana, with some creeks exceeding 100-year recurrence intervals. Rainfall totals reached up to 10 in (250 mm). The American Red Cross estimated that flooding damaged 300 homes in English and 200 each in Marengo and Milltown, while the sheriff of Crawford County conjectured that 66 dwellings, 26 businesses, 13 mobile homes, and 2 churches suffered major damage. In English, water reached as high as 10 ft (3.0 m) above ground and toppled cars and carried away mobile homes from their foundations. Marengo's commerce district also suffered flood damage. In Milltown, the Big Blue River swelled about 4 ft (1.2 m) in one hour. The destruction of a culvert south of French Lick led to the closure of State Road 145. One person died near Princeton while working on an outdoor fuse box as heavy precipitation fell, resulting in electrocution. One neighborhood around Princeton evacuated due to floodwaters reaching 6 ft (1.8 m) above ground. Some damage occurred in western Marion County as two tornadoes touched down. Governor Otis Bowen estimated that this system and the Hurricane Bob caused approximately $50 million in damage in Indiana, with just over $31.3 million incurred to crops.

== Aftermath ==
On July 28, 1979, President Jimmy Carter issued a disaster declaration for Texas, allowing the counties of Brazoria, Chambers, Dallas, Galveston, Jefferson and Orange to be eligible for government aid in order to recover from flooding. Following the storm, Governor Bill Clements urged Texans living in coastal areas to purchase flood insurance. The American Red Cross opened assistance centers in Alvin, Angleton, Bay City, Baytown, Dickinson, Freeport, League City, Seabrook, and South Houston. By August 6, the Red Cross had expended approximately $712,000 to aid victims of Claudette, including serving 111,090 meals and providing other forms of assistance of 3,471 families. Overall, the organization opened 48 shelters, which housed up to 6,282 people. A spokesperson with the Red Cross stated that roughly 1,500 volunteers helped victims of the flooding and of a devastating fire at an apartment complex. The Federal Emergency Management Agency reported that by that same day, it was processing about 7,100 insurance claims.

A salvage dealer, Kenneth Stephens, purchased 359 flood-damaged Ford vehicles from dealerships in Baytown and Dickinson, ostensibly to sell scrap metals and other parts. However, a Ford Motor Company spokesperson alleged that Stephens instead sold the vehicles whole, in violation of a contract, and warned potential buyers to be aware of unusually low-priced 1979 Ford cars. Consequently, the Ford Motor Company and the American Road Insurance Co. took legal action against Stephens. However, by the time that United States District Court Judge William Overton ordered Stephens to refrain from selling the vehicles, only 3 out of the 359 cars remained. Stephens testified that most of the vehicles had been sold to other salvage dealers in Kansas, Oklahoma, and Texas.

Indiana Governor Otis Bowen requested aid from President Carter via letter. In response, President Carter issued a disaster declaration for Crawford, Gibson, Martin, Orange, Sullivan, Vermillion, and Vigo counties.

== See also ==
- List of Texas hurricanes
- List of wettest tropical cyclones in Texas
- Other storms of the same name
- 2018 Kauai flood - a flash flood that has an unverified peak 24 hour rainfall of 49.69 in (1,262 mm), which would break Claudette's record
- Hurricane Laura - a stronger storm that would take a similar path to Claudette
