= 1986 Jamaica floods =

1986 natural disaster in Jamaica

1986 Jamaica flood
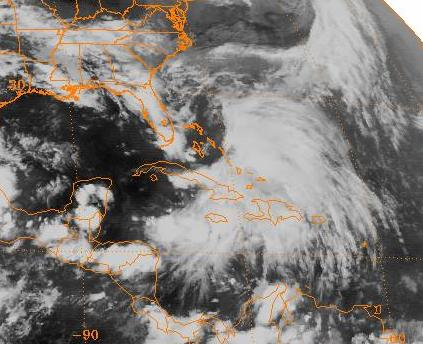
- Satellite image of the system over the Greater Antilles
- Date: May–June 1986
- Location: Jamaica, Hispaniola, Cuba
- Deaths: 94
- Property damage: $25 million (1986 USD) (Note: All damage totals are in 1986 United States dollars.)

Floods killed 50 people in Jamaica in 1986, comparable to flooding that occurred in June 1979. The floods originated as a stationary front on 24 May that produced rainfall across much of the central Caribbean Sea for two weeks. Rainfall totals in Jamaica reached 635 mm (25.0 in) at Norman Manley International Airport. The flooding left heavy agriculture damage totaling $22.5 million, and 40,000 residents per day received meals after the event. Roads and bridges were damaged across the country, and one damaged bridge resulted in eight deaths after a bus crashed. The floods left 2,000 Jamaicans homeless.

Elsewhere, the floods were the worst in Haiti in decades. There, a swollen river destroyed several homes in Les Cayes, and there were 21 deaths nationwide. In neighboring Dominican Republic, flooding isolated several towns and caused mudslides that killed 12 people. In Cuba, flooding was worst in the easternmost four provinces, and there were five deaths. The overall system spawned a subtropical cyclone on 5 June that later became Tropical Storm Andrew.

== Meteorological history ==
Beginning on 24 May, a stationary front persisted across the central Caribbean Sea. It dropped torrential rainfall across Jamaica, totaling 275 mm (10.8 in) in Saint Andrew Parish, and 635 mm (25.0 in) at Norman Manley International Airport. There were reports as high as 1,270 mm (50 in) in the southern portion of the country. The high rainfall caused rivers to flow faster than usual, and the Yallahs River reported a peak discharge of 453 m^{3}/s. Flooding also affected Hispaniola and eastern Cuba. In Haiti, the floods were reported as the worst in decades. The system gradually moved to the north through the Greater Antilles, developing into a subtropical cyclone on 5 June. It eventually became Tropical Storm Andrew before dissipating on 8 June.

== Impact ==
The high rainfall caused island-wide flooding in Jamaica, as well as widespread landslides. Along the coast, freshwater flooding decreased salt-levels, lowered ocean temperatures, and caused a significant increase of phytoplankton. By two weeks after the floods subsided, phytoplankton levels returned to normal. Significant agricultural damage occurred due to the flooding. Over 17,600 acres (7,100 ha) of crop fields were damaged, and many livestock and fish died. Damage was heaviest in Clarendon Parish, and the nationwide crop damage was estimated at $22.5 million. Water systems were damaged in eight of the fourteen parishes of Jamaica, leaving 100,000 people without water. More than 300 roads were damaged or blocked, and 15 bridges were damaged. Four people were killed after being buried by a landslide. A collapsed bridge in May Pen, located southwest of Kingston, was washed out by the Rio Minho, killing eight people in a bus. Nationwide, 14 hospitals and 16 other health facilities were severely damaged, and many government offices had roof damage. Damage to utilities was estimated at $1.65 million. The floods left 2,000 people homeless, many of whom stayed in shelters, and there were 50 deaths. The flooding was described as similar to the deadly floods in June 1979.

Flooding was also reported in Hispaniola and eastern Cuba. In Cuba, a state of alert was declared for Santiago de Cuba, Guantanamo, Granma, and Holguin provinces, and 7,500 people were evacuated. Heavy rainfall caused landslides and isolated several towns after roads and rails were blocked. Some areas lost power or telephone services. Five people were killed in Cuba, four of whom from drowning and one from electrocution. In nearby Haiti, flooding was worst in Les Cayes, where the Ravine River destroyed many homes and left 1,300 homeless. Throughout the country, flooding severely damaged crops and wrecked bridges and roads. There were 21 deaths in the Les Cayes area. In the Dominican Republic, there were 12 deaths around Santo Domingo after mudslides buried people. Four towns were isolated after rivers exceeded their banks, forcing hundreds of people to evacuate. Overall, the system caused 94 deaths and $25 million in damage.

== Aftermath ==
After the floods subsided, the government of Jamaica appealed to the international community for assistance. Local workers cleared roads, and about 1,100 people assisted in various relief efforts. The Jamaican Red Cross provided about 40,000 meals each day to residents who lost food during the floods. Repairing damaged roads and bridges cost about $4.3 million. For at least one day, all schools and most businesses on the island were closed.

In the weeks following the floods, the Pan American Health Organization provided $10,000 worth of water supply units and a group of six workers, and offices within the United Nations provided $55,000 worth of contributions. The government of Barbados provided five units to assist in vector control, and the United States donated $25,000 in aid. The European Economic Community donated about $376,300 in assistance. The government of Canada provided $142,490 worth of aid, and the government of West Germany donated $21,740. The British Red Cross and the United Kingdom government collectively donated $302,850 to the country, mostly for 3 helicopters to transport relief and medical teams. The California Air National Guard flew three trips of supplies, including 2,000 cots, to Jamaica.
