= Office of Disaster Preparedness and Emergency Management =

Jamaican disaster preparedness coordinating body

Agency overview
- Formed: June 1980 (as Office of Disaster Preparedness and Emergency Relief Coordination); 1993 (as Office of Disaster Preparedness and Emergency Management)
- Jurisdiction: Prime Minister of Jamaica
- Employees: 60 (2007)
- Agency executive: Alvin Gayle
- Website: www.odpem.org.jm

The Office of Disaster Preparedness and Emergency Management (formerly known as the ODIPERC or Office of Disaster Preparedness and Emergency Relief Coordination) is the Jamaican disaster preparedness coordinating body, which is responsible for preventing and reducing impact of hazards. It also coordinates responses to inter-island disasters with the Caribbean Disaster Emergency Response Agency.

== History ==
On 11 June 1979, the Tropical Depression One brought intense flooding to Jamaica. Recognizing the need for a disaster preparedness and relief organization, the Government of Jamaica established the ODIPERC in June 1980 to provide relief and prepare Jamaica for future disasters.

In 1993, the name ODIPERC was made into a statuary body and was renamed to ODPEM.

Following the passing of Hurricane Melissa on 5 November 2025, the ODPEM was reassigned to the Office of the Prime Minister (OPM). Jamaica Defence Force commander Alvin Gayle was appointed director general of the ODPEM, while former acting head Richard Thompson had been resigned to the OPM " to assist in the establishment of strategic frameworks and systems for national relief and recovery efforts."
