= Tropical Depression One (1979) =

Atlantic tropical depression in 1979

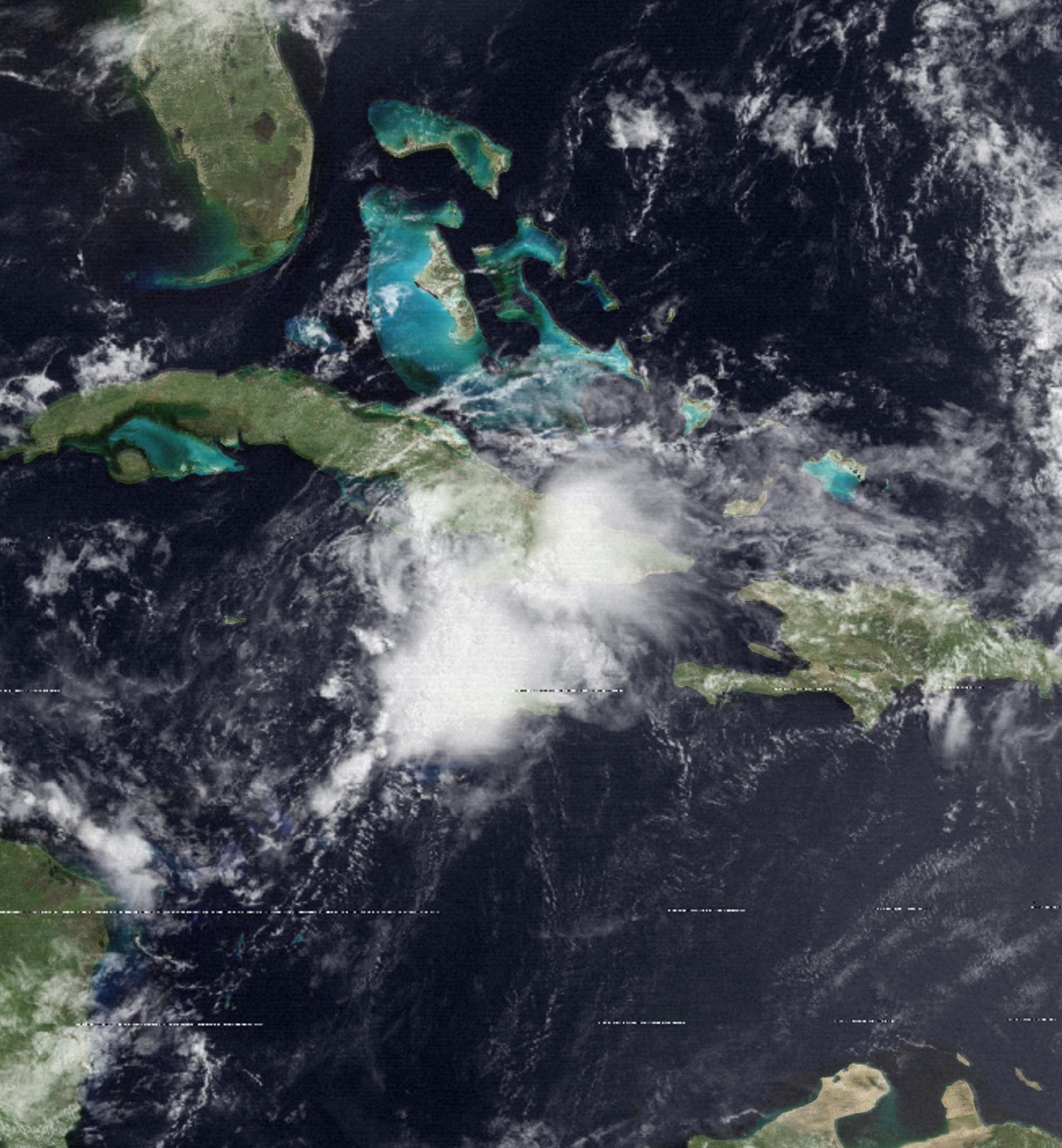
- Tropical Depression One on June 12

Meteorological history
- Formed: June 11, 1979
- Dissipated: June 16, 1979

Tropical depression
- 1-minute sustained (SSHWS/NWS)
- Highest winds: 35 mph (55 km/h)
- Lowest pressure: 1005 mbar (hPa); 29.68 inHg

Overall effects
- Fatalities: 41
- Damage: $27 million (1979 USD)
- Areas affected: Bahamas, Cuba, East Coast of the United States, and Jamaica
- IBTrACS
- Part of the 1979 Atlantic hurricane season

Tropical Depression One brought severe flooding to Jamaica in June 1979. The second tropical cyclone of the Atlantic hurricane season, the depression developed from a tropical wave to the south of Grand Cayman on June 11. Tracking generally northward, the depression passed west of Jamaica. On June 12, the depression peaked with maximum sustained winds of 35 mph (55 km/h), never having reached tropical storm status. The following day, it made landfall in Cuba, where minimal impact was recorded. Early on June 14, the depression emerged into the western Atlantic Ocean and then moved parallel to the east coast of Florida for a few days. The depression made another landfall in South Carolina on June 16 and dissipated shortly thereafter.

The slow movement of the depression to the west of Jamaica resulted in torrential rainfall, peaking at 32 in (810 mm) in Friendship, a city in Westmoreland Parish. Throughout western Jamaica, about 1,000 homes were destroyed or severely damaged, while up to 40,000 people were left homeless. The city of New Market was submerged for at least six months. Crops, electricity, telephones, buildings, and railways also suffered damage during the disaster. There were 40 deaths and approximately $27 million (1979 USD) in damage. The depression also brought heavy precipitation to Cuba and the Bahamas, while farther north, light rainfall and rough seas plagued the East Coast of the United States. One individual in South Carolina went missing and was later presumed to have died after their boat was torn loose from its mooring.

== Meteorological history ==
Map plotting the storm's track and intensity, according to the Saffir–Simpson scale Map key Saffir–Simpson scale Tropical depression (≤38 mph, ≤62 km/h) Tropical storm (39–73 mph, 63–118 km/h) Category 1 (74–95 mph, 119–153 km/h) Category 2 (96–110 mph, 154–177 km/h) Category 3 (111–129 mph, 178–208 km/h) Category 4 (130–156 mph, 209–251 km/h) Category 5 (≥157 mph, ≥252 km/h) Unknown Storm type Tropical cyclone Subtropical cyclone Extratropical cyclone, remnant low, tropical disturbance, or monsoon depression

A tropical wave emerged into the Atlantic Ocean from the west coast of Africa on May 30. Minimal development occurred as the wave tracked westward across much of the Atlantic and Caribbean Sea. However, by June 11, the system began to interact with a stationary trough of low pressure in the western Caribbean Sea. Based on ship and land observations, a tropical depression developed at 12:00 UTC that day while located about 230 miles (370 km) south of Grand Cayman. Initially the depression was forecast to move northwestward at about 5 mph (8 km/h); instead, it drifted to the northeast. Minimal intensification occurred, as satellite imagery, weather stations, and a reconnaissance aircraft indicated the depression remained below tropical storm status. Around 18:00 UTC on June 12, the depression attained its maximum sustained wind speeds of 35 mph (55 km/h).

Early on June 13, satellite and weather radar showed heavy rainbands moving across Jamaica and eastern Cuba. Due its interaction with the two islands, the depression weakened slightly. Later on June 13, the storm made landfall near Venezuela, Cuba with winds of 30 mph (45 km/h). Moving northward, it emerged into the Atlantic Ocean near Cayo Santa María early the next day. Around 12:00 UTC on June 14, the system re-strengthened and again attained its maximum sustained wind speed of 35 mph (55 km/h). Despite moving back over open waters, the depression failed to intensify further. Operationally, the system was thought to have made landfall in east-central Florida, but later analysis revealed that the center remained over water. The depression continued northward until striking near Charleston, South Carolina late on June 16, still with the same intensity. It degenerated into a remnant low pressure area about six hours later. Its remnants continued northeastward across the Southeastern United States, the Mid-Atlantic, and New England until dissipating fully on June 18.

== Impact ==
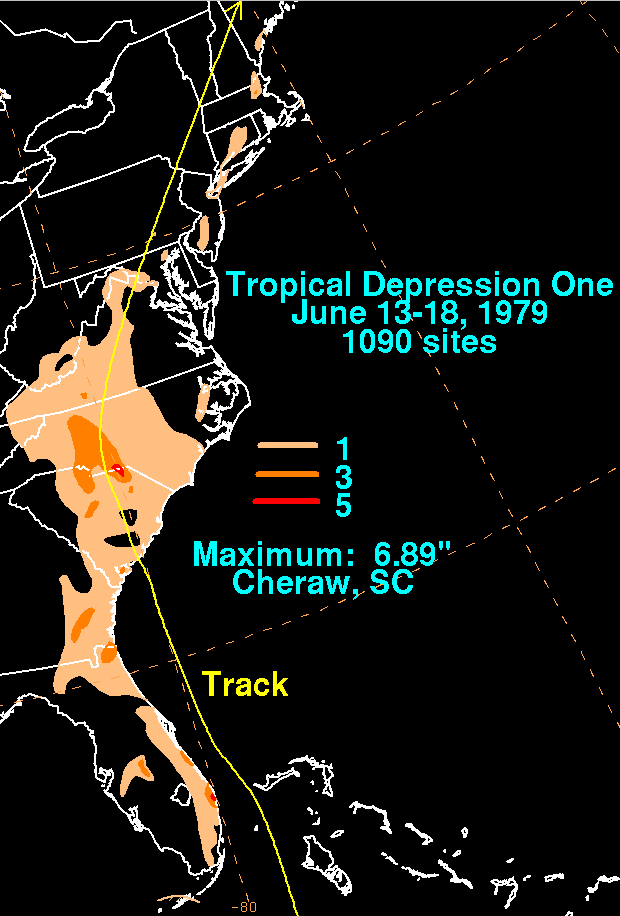
Rainfall totals in the United States

The depression's slow movement resulted in torrential rainfall on the island of Jamaica. Precipitation peaked at 32 inches (810 mm) in Friendship, located in Westmoreland Parish. As the flooding began, several shelters were open in the parish. Residents in the Savanna-la-Mar area were forced to evacuate by boats or makeshift rafts. The flooding also ruined crops. Sugar cane, which was already 70–80 percent harvested, suffered about $2.25 million (1979 USD) in damage. It was estimated that 4 million lb (1.8 million kg) of bananas were lost, worth nearly $1 million. In total, agricultural interests incurred $5.89 million in damage, chiefly f which was in Westmoreland Parish. The storm affected an estimated 300 mi (480 km) of roadways impacted, with about 2,000 ft (610 m) of highway completely washed out. Three bridges collapsed, while 10 others sustained damage.

The increasing height and volume of the Bluefields River led to debris flow and created a colluvium – an unconsolidated deposit of sediments – near the mouth of the river. In the valley areas, temporary lakes were formed and small dams were overtopped. The cities of Chigwell, Enfield, Exeter, Leamington, and New Market were all submerged during the flooding. New Market was inundated with as much as 80 ft (24 m) of water during the disaster, which did not completely recede until more than six months later. This resulted in extreme damage to or complete loss of crops, livestock, and household possessions. Extensive impact to property was reported, including to electricity, telephones, buildings, and railways, with a "conservative" estimate of $39.3 million in damage. At least 1,000 homes were severely damaged or destroyed. As many as 40,000 people were left homeless. Overall, there were 40 deaths and approximately $27 million in damage.

Following the storm, Hanover, Saint Elizabeth, Saint James, and Westmoreland parishes were considered disaster areas. A task force was established by the Prime Minister Michael Manley for reconstruction efforts. About 7,758 families, a total of 36,391 people, required assistance with food supplies for over 13 weeks. The Housing Task Force called for the construction of 582 new houses, 300 of which for those left homeless. The houses constructed for the people rendered homeless were prefabricated by the Ministry of Housing and then erected by the local authorities, under the guidance of the Ministry of Local Government. In response to the disaster, the Government of Jamaica established the Office of Disaster Preparedness and Emergency Management in July 1980.

The depression and its remnants also brought rainfall and high tides to the eastern United States. In South Carolina, precipitation peaked at 6.89 in (175 mm) in Cheraw. Along the coast, waves reached 13 ft (4.0 m) in height, strong enough to tear a boat from its mooring at Surfside Beach. One person was listed as missing and later presumed to have died.

== See also ==
- 1986 Jamaica floods
- Tropical Depression Fourteen (1987)
- Tropical Storm Chris (1988)
