= 1979 Atlantic hurricane season =

- Season summary map

Seasonal boundaries
- First system formed: June 11, 1979
- Last system dissipated: November 15, 1979

Strongest storm
- Name: David
  - Maximum winds: 175 mph (280 km/h) (1-minute sustained)
  - Lowest pressure: 924 mbar (hPa; 27.29 inHg)

Seasonal statistics
- Total depressions: 26
- Total storms: 9
- Hurricanes: 5 (1 unofficial)
- Major hurricanes (Cat. 3+): 2
- Total fatalities: 2,149 total
- Total damage: $4.067 billion (1979 USD)

Related articles
- Timeline of the 1979 Atlantic hurricane season; 1979 Pacific hurricane season; 1979 Pacific typhoon season; 1979 North Indian Ocean cyclone season

The 1979 Atlantic hurricane season was the first Atlantic hurricane season to include both male and female names on its list of tropical cyclone names. The season officially began on June 1, and lasted until November 30. These dates conventionally delimit the period of each year when most tropical cyclones form in the Atlantic basin. Despite a high amount of tropical depressions forming, it was a slightly below average season in terms of named storms, with nine systems reaching tropical storm intensity. The first system, an unnumbered tropical depression, developed north of Puerto Rico on June 9. Two days later, Tropical Depression One formed and produced severe flooding in Jamaica, with 41 deaths and about $27 million (1979 USD) in damage. (Note: All damage figures are in 1979 USD, unless otherwise noted) Tropical Storm Ana caused minimal impact in the Lesser Antilles. Hurricane Bob spawned tornadoes and produced minor wind damage along the Gulf Coast of the United States, primarily in Louisiana, while the remnants caused flooding, especially in Indiana. Tropical Storm Claudette caused flooding in Puerto Rico, Texas, and the Midwestern United States that left eight deaths and at least about $750 million in damage.

The most intense tropical cyclone of the season was Hurricane David. It moved across the Lesser Antilles in late August, with the worst hit islands being Dominica and Martinique. The storm then strengthened further and struck Dominican Republic as a Category 5 hurricane. David was the strongest and deadliest tropical cyclone to make landfall in that country since 1930. In Dominican Republic alone, the system caused approximately 1,000 deaths and $1 billion in damage. Later, David brought wind damage, tornadoes, and flooding to portions of the East Coast of the United States. Overall, the storm resulted in 2,078 deaths and $1.54 billion in damage. Hurricane Frederic brought destruction to the Gulf Coast of the United States, especially in Alabama and Mississippi.

Tropical Storm Elena brought flooding to the Greater Houston area, with five deaths and about $10 million in damage. However, little impact was reported elsewhere. Hurricane Henri remained offshore in the Gulf of Mexico and disrupted efforts to stop the Ixtoc I oil spill. Henri also caused flooding in portions of Mexico. In mid and late-September, a tropical depression caused flooding in the Southern United States, especially Texas. Four deaths were reported, two in Texas and two in Kentucky. Toward the end of October, a brief hurricane force subtropical storm struck Newfoundland, but left little impact. Other than Tropical Depression One and the tropical depression that brought flooding to the Southern United States in mid and late-September, none of the other depressions caused significant effects of land. Collectively, the tropical cyclones of the season resulted in $4.07 billion in damage and at least 2,149 deaths.

== Seasonal summary ==
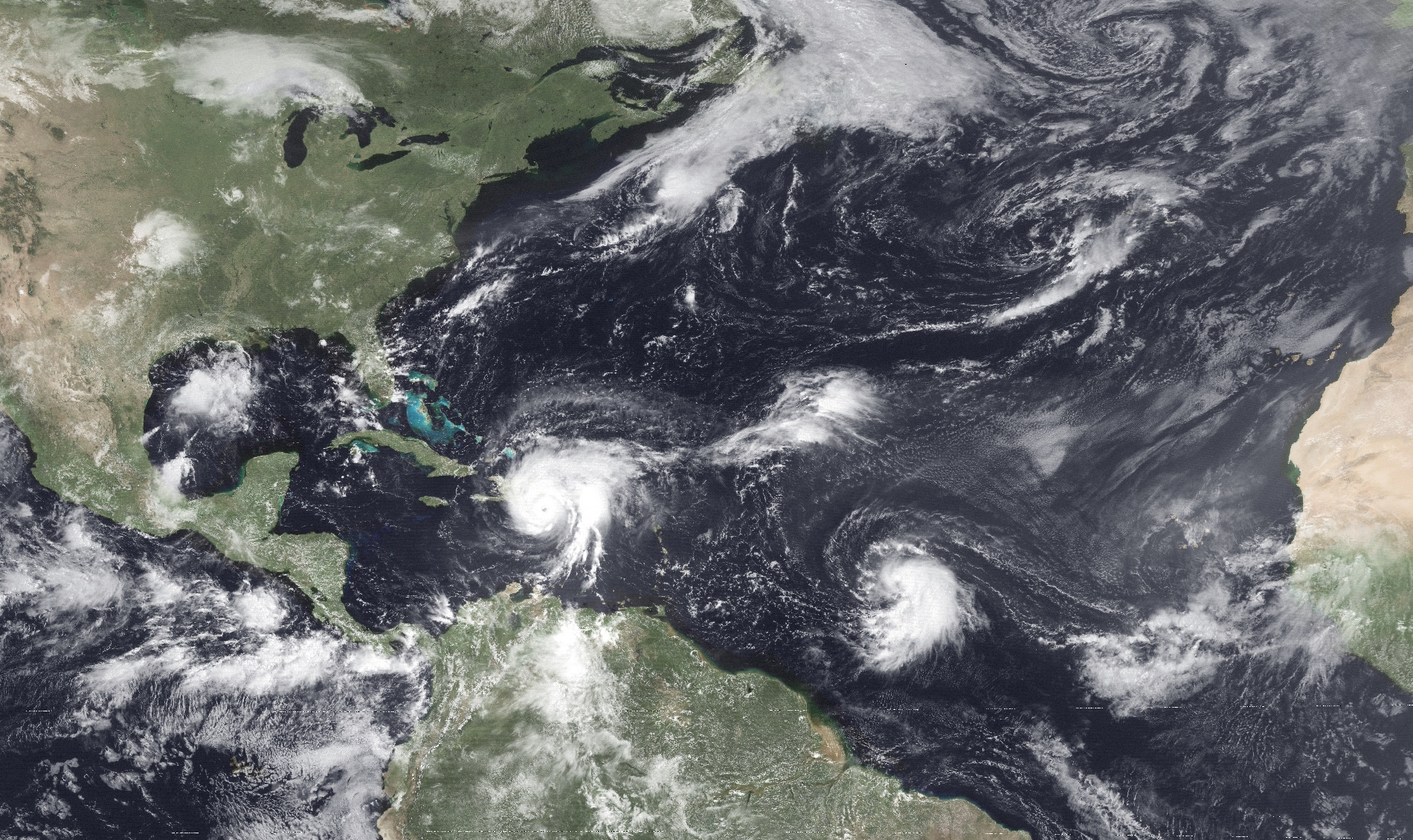
Four tropical cyclones were active on August 31 – Hurricane David, and Tropical Storms Elena and Frederic, and an unnumbered tropical depression

The Atlantic hurricane season officially began on June 1, 1979. Although 26 tropical systems were observed, only 16 reached the level of tropical or subtropical depression, and nine of them reached tropical storm intensity, which is slightly below the 1950-2000 average of 9.6 named storms per season. Of the nine tropical storms, five of them strengthened into a hurricane, which is also slightly below average. Two of the five hurricanes became major hurricanes, which is Category 3 or greater on the Saffir–Simpson hurricane wind scale. Collectively, the cyclones of the 1979 Atlantic hurricane season caused at least 2,149 fatalities and $4.07 billion in damage. Despite their intensities, Tropical Depression One and an unnumbered one in September also caused deaths. Additionally, the former inflicted about $27 million in damage from severe flooding in Jamaica. The last storm of the season, an unnumbered tropical depression, dissipated on November 15, about 15 days before the official end of hurricane season on November 30.

Tropical cyclogenesis began in June, with three tropical depressions, one of which strengthened into Tropical Storm Ana. A total of four systems formed in the month of July, including Hurricane Bob and Tropical Storm Claudette. Activity briefly halted after Tropical Depression Six dissipated on August 6 and lasted until Hurricane David developed on August 25. There were four other tropical cyclones that month, including Hurricane Frederic and Tropical Storm Elena. In September, six systems developed, with the named storms of the month being hurricane Gloria and Henri. October was slightly less active, with four tropical cyclones, one of which was an unnamed subtropical storm. Two additional tropical depressions developed in November, the second of which dissipated on November 15.

The season's activity was reflected with an accumulated cyclone energy (ACE) rating of 93. ACE is a metric used to express the energy used by a tropical cyclone during its lifetime. Therefore, a storm with a longer duration will have high values of ACE. It is only calculated at six-hour increments in which specific tropical and subtropical systems are either at or above sustained wind speeds of 39 mph (63 km/h), which is the threshold for tropical storm intensity.

== Systems ==
=== Tropical Depression One ===
- Tropical depression (SSHWS)
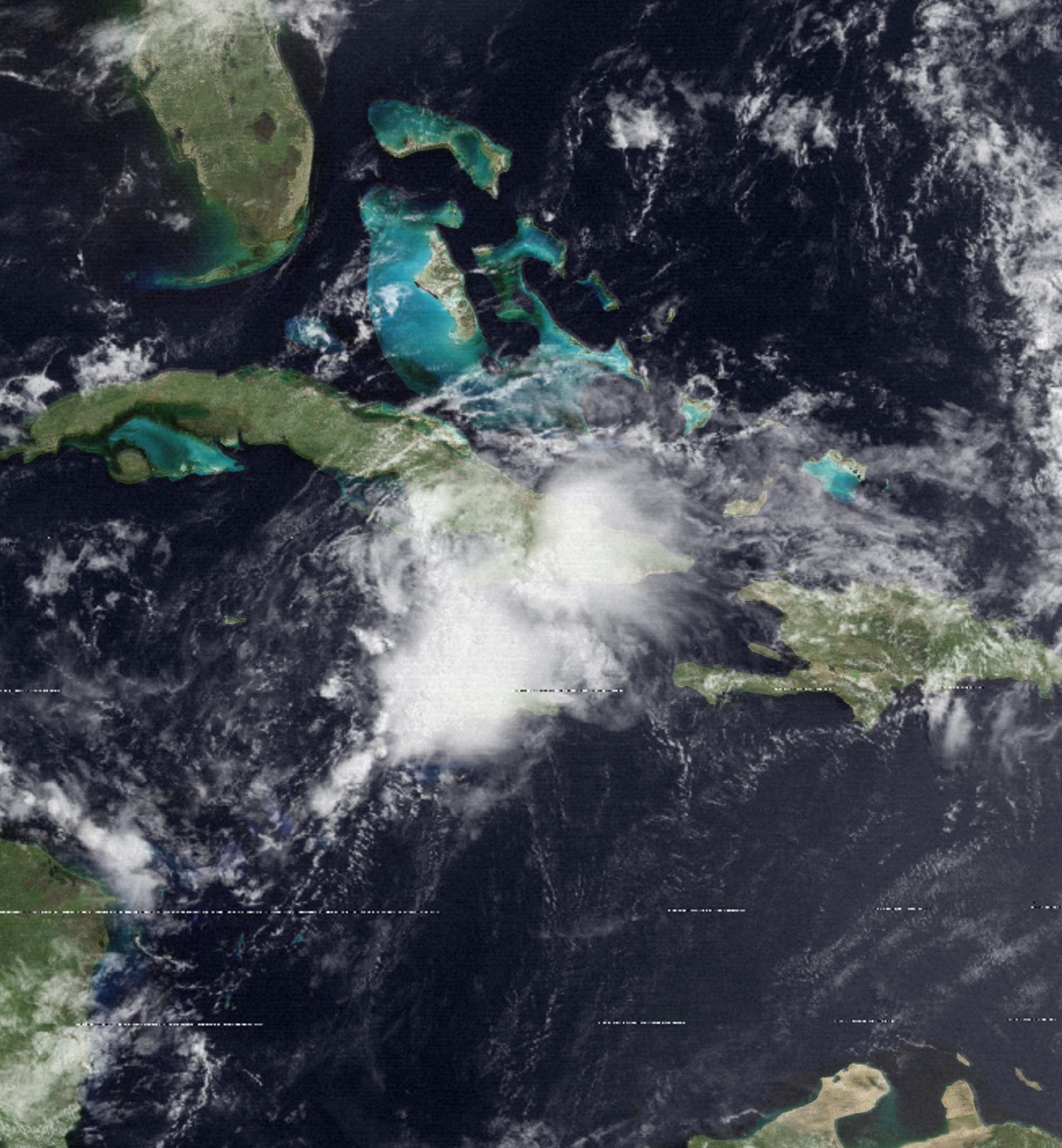
- Duration: June 11 – June 16
- Peak intensity: 35 mph (55 km/h) (1-min); 1005 mbar (hPa)

A tropical wave in the western Caribbean situated south of Grand Cayman developed into a tropical depression on June 11. Tracking generally northward, the depression passed west of Jamaica. On June 12, the depression peaked with maximum sustained winds of 35 mph (55 km/h) system, having never reached tropical storm status. The following day, it made landfall in Cuba. Early on June 14, the depression emerged into the western Atlantic Ocean and then moved parallel to the east coast of Florida for a few days. The depression made another landfall in South Carolina on June 16 and dissipated hours later.

The slow movement of the depression to the west of Jamaica resulted in torrential rainfall, peaking at 32 in (810 mm) in Friendship, a city in Westmoreland Parish. Throughout western Jamaica, about 1,000 homes were destroyed or severely damaged, while up to 40,000 people were rendered homeless. The city of New Market was submerged for at least six months. Crops, electricity, telephones, buildings, and railways also suffered damage during the disaster. There were 40 deaths and approximately $27 million in damage. The depression also brought heavy precipitation to the Bahamas and Cuba. Along the East Coast of the United States, light rainfall, strong winds, and rough seas were observed. In South Carolina, a person went missing and was later presumed to have drowned after their boat was torn loose from its mooring.

=== Tropical Storm Ana ===
- Tropical storm (SSHWS)
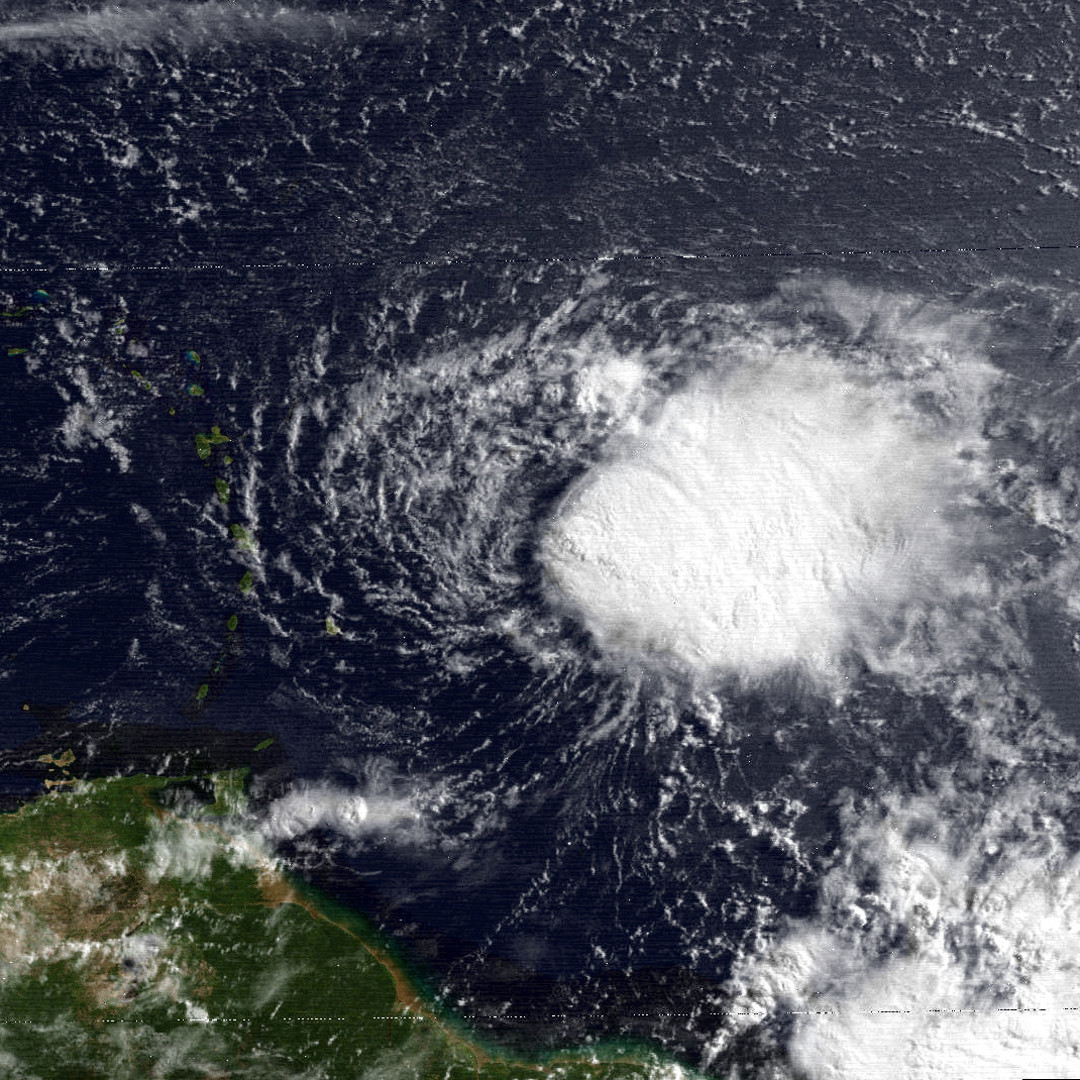
- Duration: June 19 – June 24
- Peak intensity: 60 mph (95 km/h) (1-min); 1005 mbar (hPa)

A tropical wave exited the west coast of Africa and entered the Atlantic on June 14. It headed westward and after satellite imagery indicated a closed circulation, the wave was classified as a tropical depression on June 19, while located several hundred miles east-southeast of the Windward Islands. The system was the first tropical cyclone to develop east of the Lesser Antilles in June since the 1933 Trinidad hurricane.

A United States Air Force reconnaissance aircraft noted that the depression was strengthening and by early on June 22, it was upgraded to Tropical Storm Ana. Thereafter, the storm began tracking almost due westward toward the Lesser Antilles. Ana peaked with winds of 60 mph (95 km/h), before wind shear began detaching deep convection from the center, resulting in weakening. Early on June 23, the storm struck St. Lucia and then fell to tropical depression intensity upon entering the Caribbean Sea. Ana continued weakening and degenerated back into a tropical wave on June 24, while located between Puerto Rico and Venezuela. Despite directly crossing St. Lucia, only light rainfall occurred. In Dominica, rain fell for 15 hours and gusty winds were reported.

=== Hurricane Bob ===
- Category 1 hurricane (SSHWS)
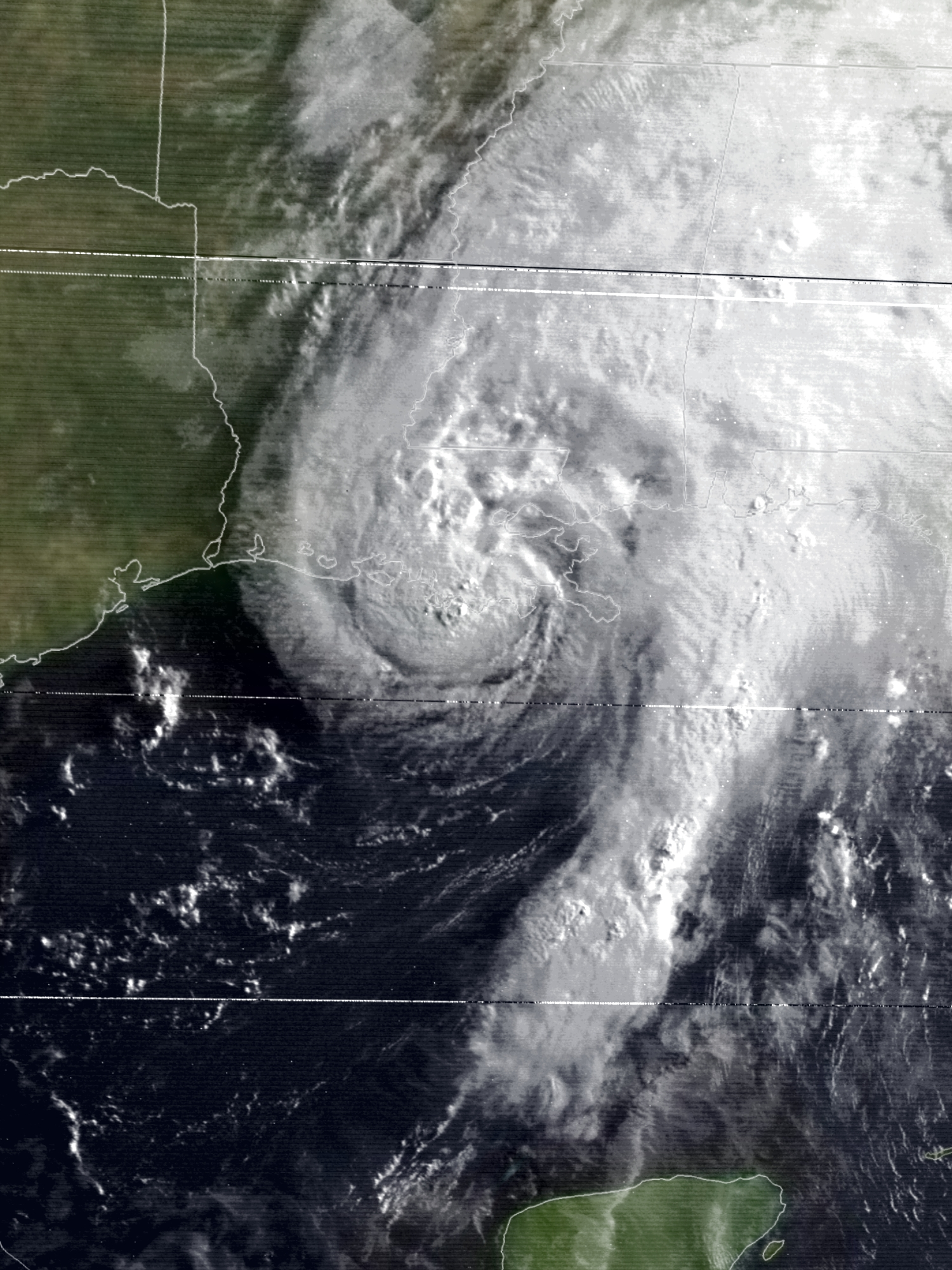
- Duration: July 9 – July 16
- Peak intensity: 75 mph (120 km/h) (1-min); 986 mbar (hPa)

A tropical wave developed into a tropical depression in the southwestern Gulf of Mexico on July 9. Tracking in a general northward direction, favorable conditions allowed for quick strengthening. Less than a day after formation, the system reached tropical storm intensity, thus being named Tropical Storm Bob and becoming the first Atlantic tropical storm with a male name, followed by hurricane intensity on July 11. Shortly after strengthening into a hurricane, Bob reached its peak intensity with maximum sustained winds of 75 mph (121 km/h). At the same intensity, Bob made landfall west of Grand Isle, Louisiana, and rapidly weakened after moving inland. However, the resulting tropical depression persisted for several days as it paralleled the Mississippi and Ohio rivers. On July 16, the system emerged into the western Atlantic, where it was subsequently absorbed by a nearby low-pressure area.

Widespread offshore and coastal evacuations took place along the Gulf Coast of the United States in preparation for Hurricane Bob. Effects from the hurricane on the United States were mostly marginal and typical of a minimal hurricane. The cyclone produced a moderate storm surge, damaging some coastal installments and causing coastal inundation. Strong winds were also associated with Bob's landfall, though no stations observed winds of hurricane force. The winds downed trees and blew out windows, in addition to causing widespread power outages. Heavy rainfall was also reported in some locations, peaking at 7.16 in (182 mm) in Louisiana. Further inland, the torrential rains led to flooding in Indiana, resulting in more considerable damage as opposed to the coast. Bob also spawned eight tornadoes, with two causing significant damage. Overall, Bob was responsible for one death and $20 million in damage.

=== Tropical Storm Claudette ===
- Tropical storm (SSHWS)
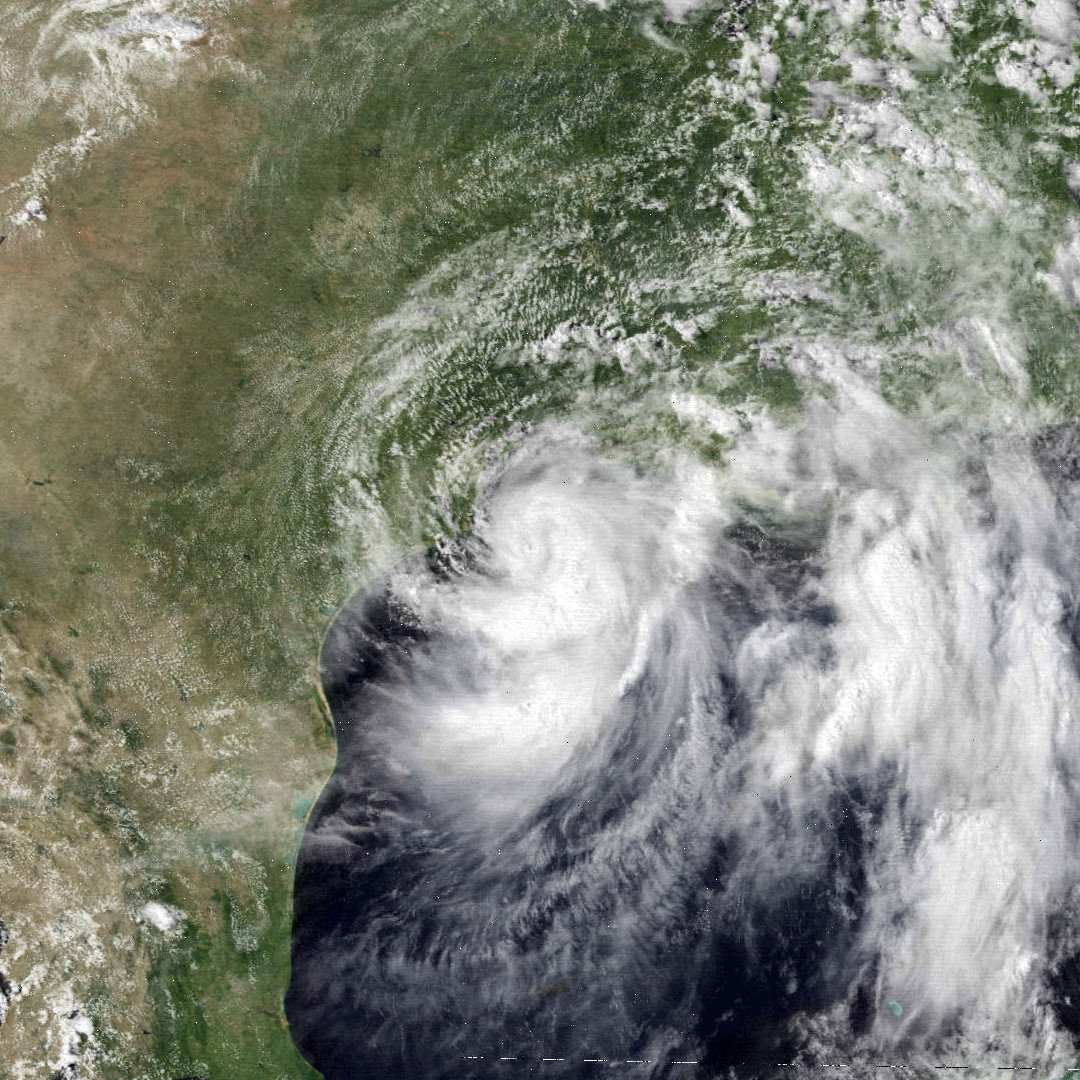
- Duration: July 16 – July 29
- Peak intensity: 50 mph (85 km/h) (1-min); 997 mbar (hPa)

A tropical wave spawned a tropical depression east of the Lesser Antilles on July 16. It gradually strengthened into Tropical Storm Claudette on July 17 and crossed the northern Leeward Islands later that day. As the storm approached Puerto Rico early on July 18, it weakened back to a tropical depression. Claudette degenerated back into a tropical wave after crossing Puerto Rico. Late on July 18, the remnants struck the Dominican Republic and emerged into the Caribbean Sea on the following day. The system crossed western Cuba on July 21, shortly before reaching the Gulf of Mexico and regenerated into a tropical cyclone. By July 23, Claudette regained tropical storm intensity and turned northward. The storm made landfall near the Texas-Louisiana border later that day. It eventually dissipated over West Virginia on July 29.

In the Lesser Antilles, the storm brought heavy rainfall and gusty winds to several islands. Minor flooding occurred in Saint Croix. Rainfall exceeding 10 in (250 mm) in some areas of Puerto Rico led to widespread agricultural damage, flooded homes and streets. There was one fatality and approximately $750,000 in damage. Up to 42 in (1,100 mm) of rain fell in one day in Alvin, Texas, which was then the record 24‑hour precipitation amount for any location in the United States. Within the state of Texas alone, hundreds of businesses and an estimated 15,000 homes sustained flood damage. Rice crops were also ruined. Six drowning deaths was reported in the state, five of which occurred following a vehicular accident that pushed a bus into a swollen creek. In Louisiana, extensive coastal flooding occurred, with miles of roads battered or destroyed in Cameron Parish, while several boats capsized. At Johnson Bayou, fishing camps and homes suffered damage or destruction. Farther inland, other states experienced freshwater flooding, especially Indiana and Missouri, with one indirect fatality in the latter. Overall, Claudette was responsible for eight deaths and $750 million in losses.

=== Hurricane David ===
- Category 5 hurricane (SSHWS)
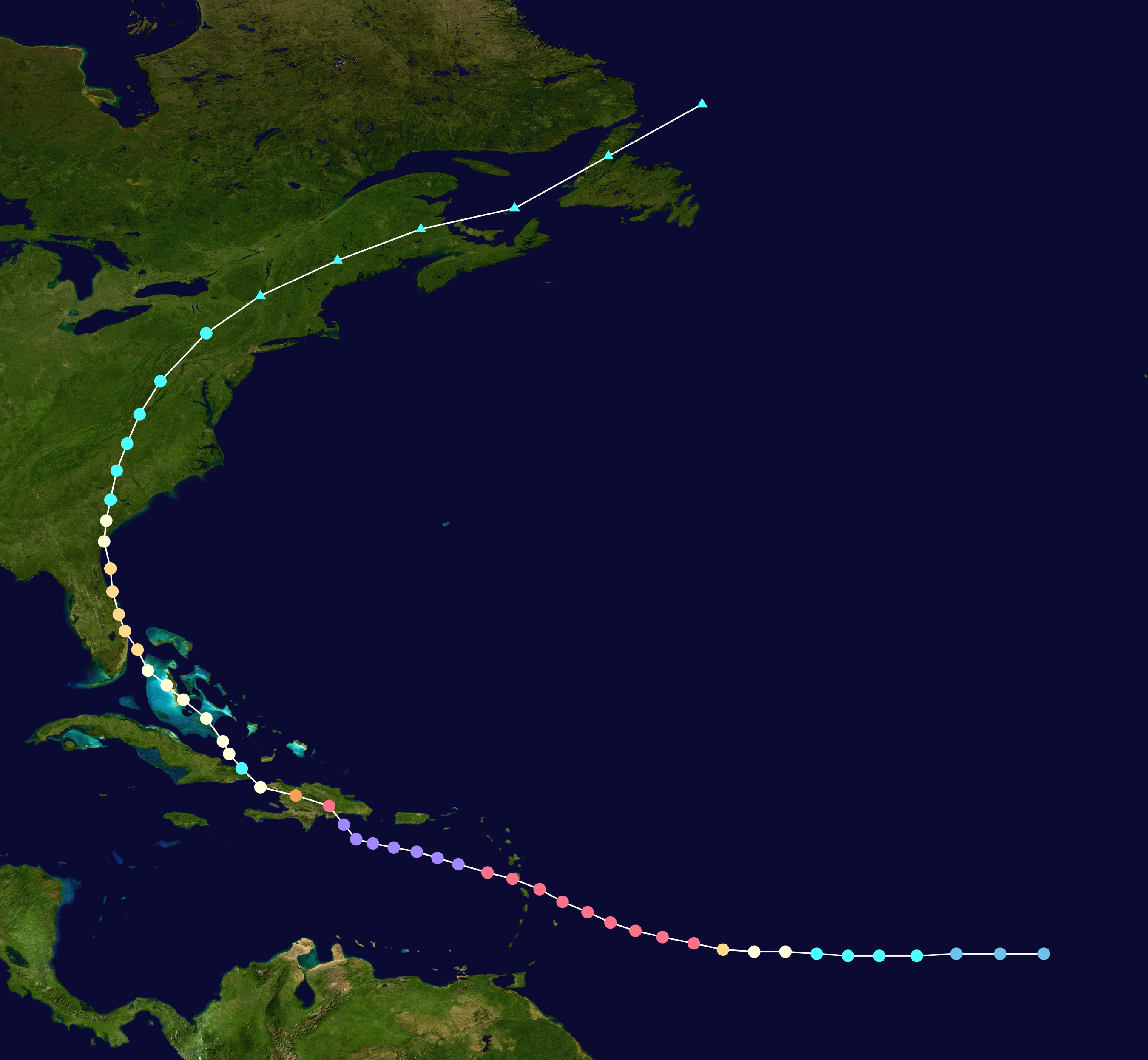
- Duration: August 25 – September 6
- Peak intensity: 175 mph (280 km/h) (1-min); 924 mbar (hPa)

A tropical wave developed into a tropical depression at 12:00 UTC on August 25, while located about 870 mi (1,400 km) southeast of Cape Verde. Moving westward, the depression intensified into Tropical Storm David early the next day. Shortly after attaining hurricane status on August 27, David rapidly deepened. By 12:00 UTC the following day, it was a strong Category 4 hurricane. Thereafter, the storm oscillated in intensity while approaching the Lesser Antilles and struck Dominica late on August 29 with winds 145 mph (230 km/h). After entering the Caribbean Sea, further deepening occurred and at 18:00 UTC on August 30, David peaked with maximum sustained winds of 175 mph (280 km/h). Late on August 31, it curved northwestward and struck Santo Domingo, Dominican Republic at the same intensity.

The storm rapidly weakened while crossing Hispaniola and was only a Category 1 hurricane upon emerging into the Windward Passage on September 1. Moving northwestward, David made landfall in the eastern tip of Cuba that day and briefly weakened to a tropical storm. However, after reaching the Atlantic, it re-strengthened into a Category 1. David then moved through the Bahamas and crossed Andros Island on September 2. Thereafter, the storm re-intensified into a Category 2 and made landfall near West Palm Beach, Florida late the next day. The hurricane remained barely inland and re-emerged into the Atlantic at Merritt Island early on September 4. Thereafter, the cyclone weakened slightly and made landfall in Blackbeard Island, Georgia later that day as a Category 1 hurricane. David headed north-northeastward and weakened to a tropical storm on September 5. While crossing the Mid-Atlantic states, the storm curved northeastward and accelerated, before becoming extratropical over New York late on September 6. The remnants of David persisted over New England and Atlantic Canada, before dissipating northeast of Newfoundland on September 8.

In Dominica, strong winds damaged or destroyed 80% of homes, leaving 75% of the island's population homeless. Agricultural was also severely impacted, with 75% of crops ruined, including a complete loss of bananas. There were 56 deaths and 180 injuries. Similar destruction occurred on Guadeloupe and Martinique, with hundreds left homeless and extensive damage to crops. Guadeloupe and Martinique also had $50 million and $100 million in damage, respectively. In Puerto Rico, flooding and high winds combined resulted in $70 million in damage and seven fatalities, four from electrocution. Dominican Republic was lashed with very strong winds and torrential rains. Entire villages were destroyed and numerous others were left isolated because of damage or destruction to many roads. Thousands of houses were destroyed, leaving over 200,000 homeless in the aftermath of the hurricane. Additionally, nearly 70% of the country's crops were ruined. Overall, the storm caused at least 2,000 deaths and about $1 billion in damage in Dominican Republic. Minimal impact occurred in the Bahamas, Cuba, and Haiti. In Florida, strong winds left moderate damage, including a downed radio tower, snapping a crane, and deroofing buildings. There were also 10 tornadoes. Damage totaled approximately $95 million. Other states along the East Coast of the United States experienced flooding and tornadoes. The latter was particularly severe in Virginia, with tornadoes causing one death, damaging 270 homes, and destroying three other homes. Throughout the United States, there were 15 deaths and about $320 million in damage.

=== Tropical Depression Eight ===
- Tropical depression (SSHWS)
- Duration: August 25 – August 28
- Peak intensity: 35 mph (55 km/h) (1-min); 1006 mbar (hPa)

A tropical disturbance formed over the Isthmus of Tehuantepec on August 24. By the following day, the disturbance developed into a tropical depression, operationally classified as the eight of the season. The depression entered the Bay of Campeche on August 25 and headed northward. Around 06:00 UTC the following day, the system peaked with maximum sustained winds of 35 mph (55 km/h). However, on August 28, a ridge of high pressure forced the system to move west-southwestward, causing it make landfall in a rural area of Tamaulipas later that day. The depression brought heavy rainfall to some areas of Mexico, with 18.94 in (481 mm) of precipitation observed in Santa María Xadani, Oaxaca. Rainfall extended northward into Texas, peaking at 4.86 in (123 mm) in McAllen.

=== Hurricane Frederic ===
- Category 4 hurricane (SSHWS)
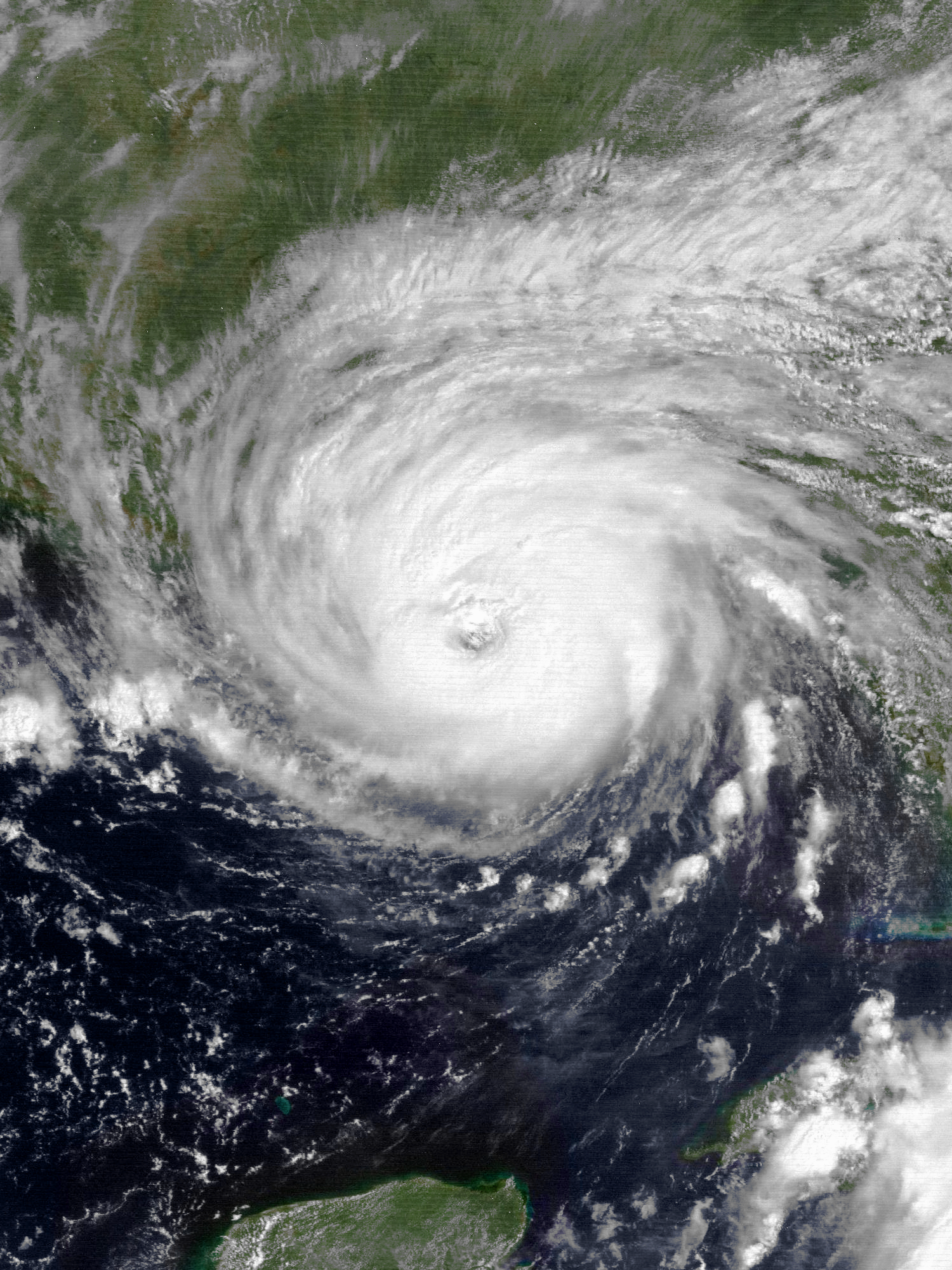
- Duration: August 29 – September 14
- Peak intensity: 130 mph (215 km/h) (1-min); 943 mbar (hPa)

Satellite imagery and ship observations indicated that a tropical depression developed at 06:00 UTC on August 29, while located about 270 mi (430 km) south-southwest of the southernmost island of Cape Verde. By 12:00 UTC the next day, the depression strengthened into Tropical Storm Frederic. Further intensification occurred, with the storm becoming a hurricane on September 1. However, outflow from Hurricane David caused Fredric to weaken back to a tropical storm early the following day. While moving across the northern Leeward Islands on September 4, bringing gusty winds and heavy rainfall to some islands. In Sint Maarten, a fishing boat sank, killing seven people. Strong winds were observed in the United States Virgin Islands (USVI). On Saint Thomas, the roofs of three large apartment buildings were blown off, leaving about 50 families homeless. Additionally, flooding destroyed four houses and impacted 50 others. Numerous houses on Saint Croix also suffered water damage. Around midday on September 4, Frederic made landfall in Humacao, Puerto Rico with winds of 50 mph (85 km/h). Flooding on the island forced over 6,000 people to flee their homes in search of shelter. Numerous roads were closed due to landslides and inundation. At least nine cities experienced flooding. Puerto Rico and the USVI both experienced at least $5 million in damage.

After crossing Puerto Rico, Frederic briefly re-emerged into the Caribbean Sea, before making landfall near Santo Domingo, Dominican Republic, with winds of 45 mph (75 km/h) at 00:00 UTC on September 6. Heavy rainfall, exceeding 24 in (610 mm) in some places, compounded damage inflicted by Hurricane David. Frederic weakened further while crossing Hispaniola. Later on September 6, the system briefly re-emerged into the Atlantic Ocean, but land interaction with the island weakened it to a tropical depression. The storm crossed the Windward Passage and then made landfall in southeastern Guantánamo Province of Cuba early on September 7, leaving minimal impact. It then moved along, or just offshore the southern coast of Cuba. While situated south of Matanzas Province early on September 9, the system re-strengthened into a tropical storm. Despite land interaction with Cuba, Frederic continued to intensify.

Shortly before emerging into the Gulf of Mexico on September 10, Frederic re-intensified into a hurricane. During the next few days, the storm significantly, but not rapidly, strengthened while moving northwestward. At 12:00 UTC on September 12, Frederic attained its peak intensity with maximum sustained winds of 130 mph (215 km/h) and a minimum barometric pressure of 943 mbar (27.8 inHg). Early on the next day, the storm made landfall near Dauphin Island and then near the Alabama–Mississippi state line. The storm rapidly weakened and fell to tropical storm intensity by late on September 13. Frederic then accelerated northeastward and became extratropical over New York around 18:00 UTC the next day. The remnants persisted until dissipating over New Brunswick early on September 15. Frederic brought destruction to the Gulf Coast of the United States. In Alabama, storm surge up to 12 ft (3.7 m) and wind gusts as high as 145 mph (233 km/h) caused the destruction of nearly all buildings within 600 ft (180 m) of the coast. In the Mobile, nearly 90% of the city lost electricity. Extensive coastal damage was also reported in Mississippi, due to tides ranging from 6 to 12 ft (1.8 to 3.7 m) above normal. Hundreds of structures were severely impacted or destroyed. Throughout the mainland United States, the storm caused five deaths and approximately $1.7 billion in damage. In Canada, the remnants of Frederic caused about C$8.238 million (US$7.095 million) in damage in southern Quebec.

=== Tropical Storm Elena ===
- Tropical storm (SSHWS)
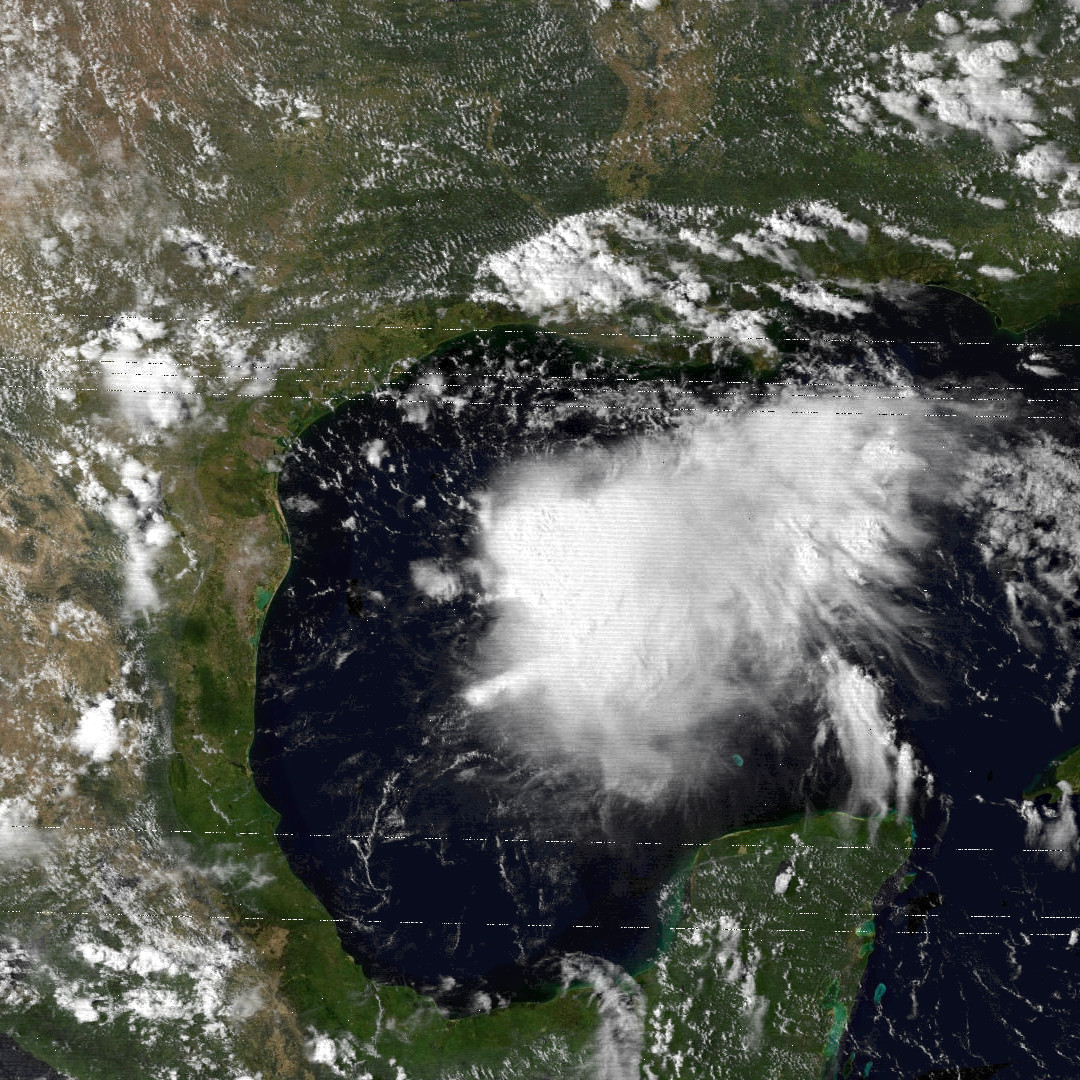
- Duration: August 30 – September 2
- Peak intensity: 40 mph (65 km/h) (1-min); 1004 mbar (hPa)

A tropical wave moved off the coast of Africa on August 17. It tracked westward, passing through the Lesser Antilles on August 22, and on August 27 the weak wave axis crossed through Florida. A tropical disturbance organized along the wave axis, with ship and buoy reports indicating the development of a low-level circulation by August 29. At 23:08 UTC later that day, a Hurricane Hunters flight reported the existence of a tropical depression; it was classified as Tropical Depression Thirteen, while located about 240 miles (390 km) south of the mouth of the Mississippi River. With a ridge of high pressure located over the southeastern United States, the depression continued tracking generally westward and intensified into Tropical Storm Elena late on August 30. Elena was the sixth tropical storm of the season, as Hurricane Frederic attained tropical storm status six hours prior to Elena. Unfavorable northerly vertical wind shear persisted through much of Elena's duration, which prohibited the development of convection. An approaching frontal trough weakened the high pressure system to its north, which resulted in Elena turning northwestward toward the Texas coastline. The storm remained poorly organized, failing to strengthen further. Around 12:00 UTC on September 1, Elena made landfall on Matagorda Island as a minimal tropical storm. The cyclone rapidly weakened after moving ashore, and early on September 2 Elena degenerated into a remnant low pressure area over southeastern Texas. Trapped between two high pressure systems, the remnant mid-level circulation drifted southwestward just inland for several days before dissipating on September 6.

Wind gusts from Elena reached 46 mph (74 km/h) in Galveston, Texas. As Elena moved ashore, it produced a 3-foot (0.91 m) storm tide at Galveston and Baytown. Rainfall from the storm was generally limited to the coastline, and peaked at 10.3 inches (260 mm) at Palacios; light rainfall also extended along the coastline of Louisiana. Near Houston, the rains produced floods that killed two people. Hundreds of cars were stalled or submerged in downtown Houston and 45 buses suffered water damage. Homes, businesses, and a police station were flooded. Overall storm was less than $10 million (1979 USD). At a dock owned by Shell Oil Company in Deer Park near Houston, a lightning bolt from Elena's thunderstorms struck the oil supertanker SS Chevron Hawaii, starting a fire and nearly splitting the ship in ahlf. The fire wrecked an adjacent barge and burned nearby docks. Oil seeped into Houston Ship Channel for several hours. Firefighters combated the fire on the tanker in boats, but their efforts were hindered due to unsettled weather from Elena, as well as unsafe water to travel through. The fire caused three deaths and 13 injuries, and damage related to the incident totaled $27 million (1979 USD).

=== Hurricane Gloria ===
- Category 2 hurricane (SSHWS)
- Duration: September 4 – September 15
- Peak intensity: 100 mph (155 km/h) (1-min); 975 mbar (hPa)

A tropical wave exited the west coast of Africa and developed into a tropical depression by September 4. Under the influence of a trough in the westerlies, the depression northeastward and bypassed Cape Verde on September 5. At 12:00 UTC on the following day, the depression was upgraded to Tropical Storm Gloria, while moving west-northwestward at about 17 mph (27 km/h). After curving abruptly north-northwestward, Gloria became a hurricane early on September 7. A higher latitude frontal system and a high pressure area caused Gloria to decelerate and resulted in a westward motion beginning on September 9.

Gloria briefly weakened to a tropical storm late on September 10, but re-strengthened into a hurricane on the following day. Eventually, the hurricane turned northeastward and began to accelerate. At 1800 UTC on September 12, Gloria attained its peak intensity with winds of 100 mph (155 km/h) and a minimum barometric pressure of 975 mbar (28.8 inHg). The storm then began weakening and fell to Category 1 hurricane intensity on September 13. During that time, Gloria slowly began merging with a low pressure area that was located north of the Azores and lost tropical characteristics by September 15. Gloria was centered well north of Flores Island in the Azores, at the time.

=== Hurricane Henri ===
- Category 1 hurricane (SSHWS)
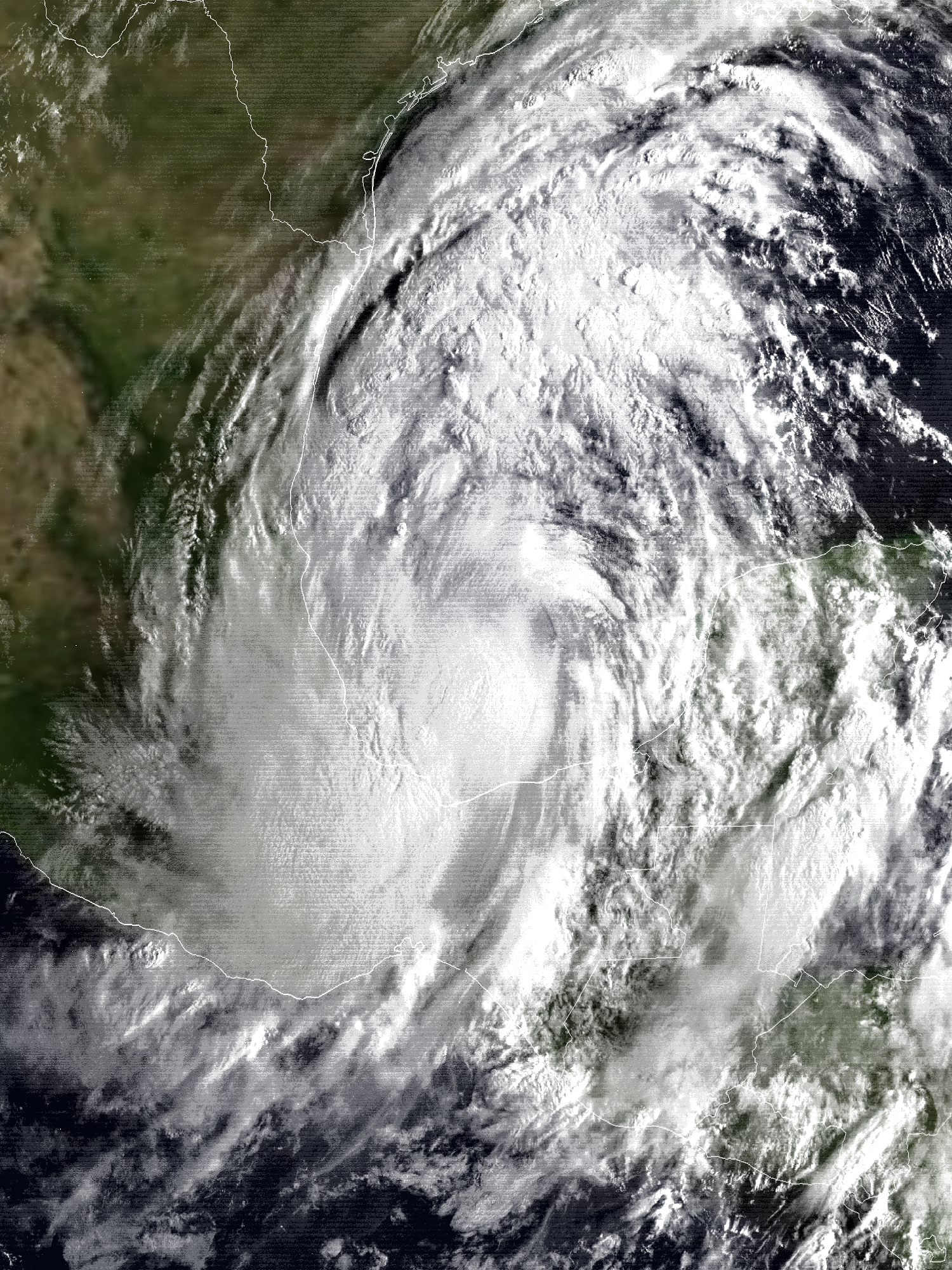
- Duration: September 15 – September 24
- Peak intensity: 85 mph (140 km/h) (1-min); 983 mbar (hPa)

A tropical wave led to the formation of Tropical Depression Eighteen in the extreme northwestern Caribbean Sea on September 14. The depression tracked northward, brushing the eastern portion of the Yucatán Peninsula. After reaching the Gulf of Mexico it turned sharply westward, with a ridge preventing further northward movement. The depression turned southwestward, and intensified into Tropical Storm Henri on September 16.Tropical Storm Henri continued to intensify as it tracked through the Bay of Campeche. On September 17, the storm turned northwestward after the ridge to its north weakened, and later that day Henri reached hurricane status; six hours later, it reached peak winds of 85 mph (140 km/h) about 150 miles (245 km) northeast of Veracruz. Subsequently, a broad low pressure area developed over the western Gulf of Mexico, causing the motion of Henri to become erratic. On September 18, the cyclone began a steady weakening trend, believed to have been caused by land interaction and the funneling of moisture toward a developing disturbance near the Texas coast. Henri turned eastward on September 19 and weakened to tropical depression status. It failed to regain significant convection, and it turned northeastward along an extended cold front. On September 21, Henri weakened into a remnant low. On September 24, Henri merged with the frontal trough in the northeastern Gulf of Mexico. Henri was one of only four hurricanes to enter the Gulf of Mexico without making landfall during the 20th century.

Henri disrupted cleanup efforts from the Ixtoc I oil spill by damaging a cap designed to stop oil from flowing into the Gulf of Mexico. Although it remained offshore, the storm brought heavy rainfall to Mexico, peaking at 19.59 inches (498 mm). The storm caused driving rains, strong winds, and floods in Ciudad del Carmen, Campeche, forcing over 2,000 people from their homes. Waters swelled in the town to about 12 inches (305 mm) above sea level. The remnants of Henri brought showers and thunderstorms to west-central Florida, causing river flooding and some evacuations.

=== Unnumbered tropical depression ===
- Tropical depression (SSHWS)
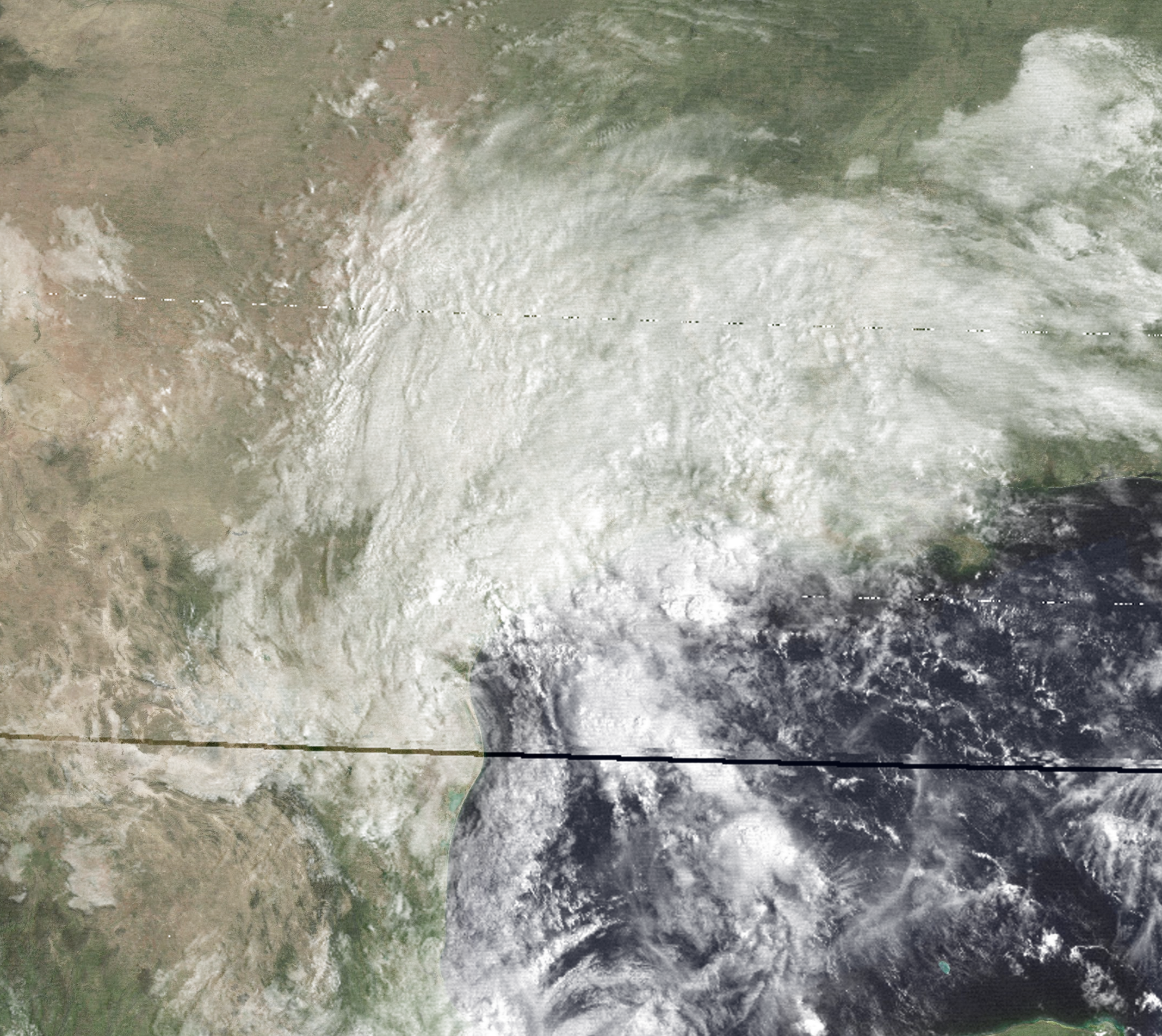
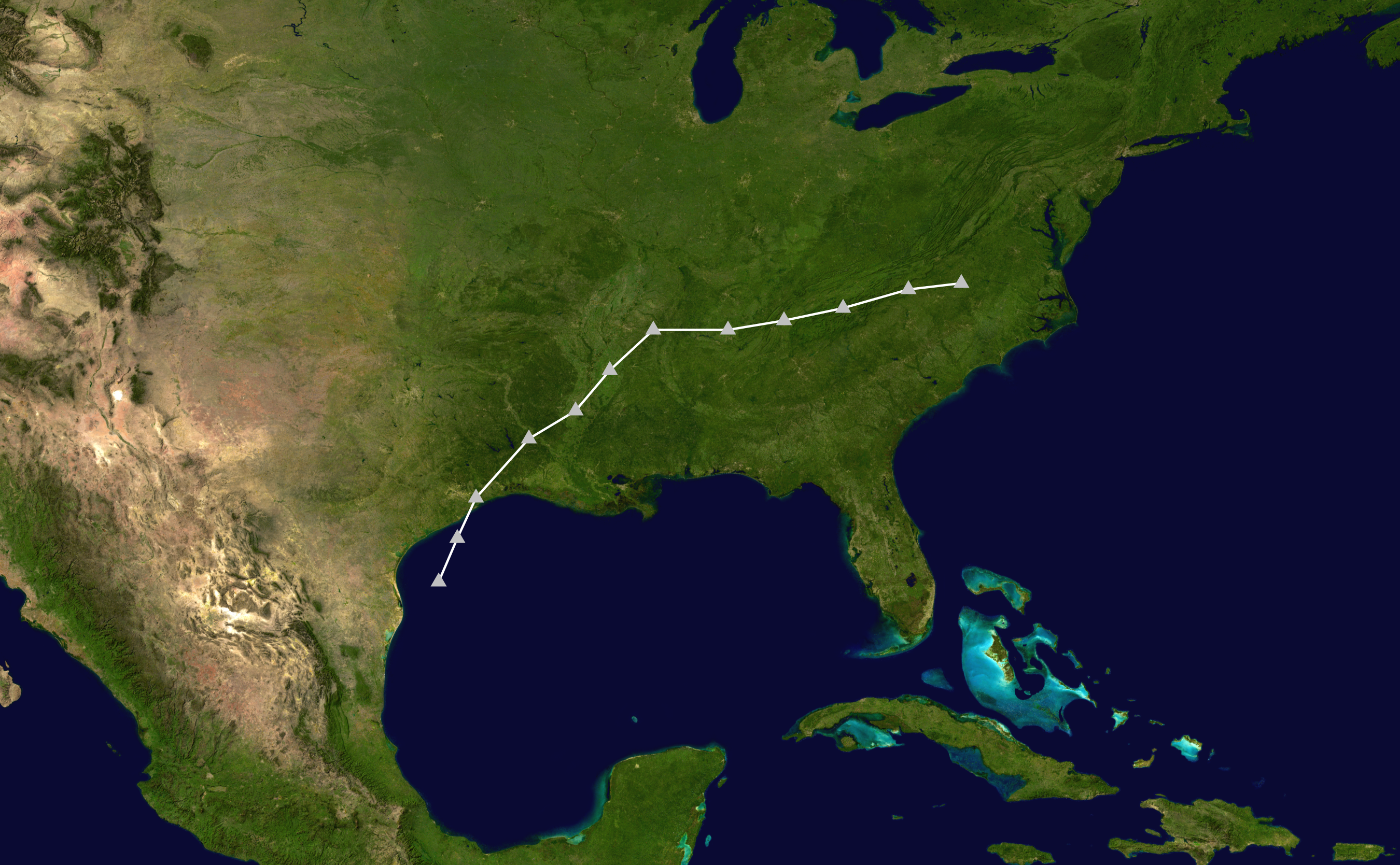
- Duration: September 19 – September 21
- Peak intensity: 35 mph (55 km/h) (1-min); 1000 mbar (hPa)

This system formed as a non-tropical low within a pre-existing area of heavy thunderstorms along a stationary front on September 19 off the coast of Brownsville, Texas. The low appeared to the northwest of Tropical Storm Henri in the Gulf of Mexico and to the east of a cold-core low over Arizona and New Mexico. The low became a non-tropical gale center on September 20, while moving into southeast Texas. The cyclone continued northeastward and dissipating over Tennessee. Sources differ on the status of this storm, with the National Hurricane Center (NHC) initially considering it a tropical depression, while the National Climatic Data Center considered the system non-tropical and it is not included in the Atlantic hurricane best track.

The depression brought heavy rainfall to Texas, with 10 to 15 in (250 to 380 mm) of precipitation between Corpus Christi and southwestern Louisiana. Severe flooding occurred, especially in Brazoria, Galveston, Harris, Nueces, and San Patricio counties. In Harris County alone, nearly 1,950 homes and hundreds of cars were flooded. Two deaths were reported in Texas, both from drowning. Portions of western Louisiana experienced 10 to 17 in (250 to 430 mm), resulting in severe flooding, with the worst impacted parishes being Allen, Calcasieu, and Rapides. Collectively, 1,400 homes, businesses, and schools were flooded in the three parishes, while 40,000 to 50,000 acres (16,000 to 20,000 ha) of crops were inundated. In Mississippi, locally strong winds caused minor damage. Flooding to a lesser extend was also reported in Kentucky, North Carolina, and Virginia. Two additional deaths occurred in Kentucky.

=== Subtropical Storm One ===
- Subtropical storm (SSHWS)
- Duration: October 23 – October 25
- Peak intensity: 75 mph (120 km/h) (1-min); 980 mbar (hPa)

A frontal wave formed about 200 mi (320 km) south-southwest of Bermuda in response to a short wave in the westerlies on October 23. After satellite imagery indicated that convection associated with the system was becoming increasingly concentrated, a subtropical depression developed 12:00 UTC. The subtropical depression moved rapidly north-northeastward and strengthened into a subtropical storm early on October 24, based on satellite imagery classification. Accelerating to a forward speed of 29 mph (47 km/h), the storm intensified further and peaked with maximum sustained winds of 75 mph (120 km/h) – equivalent to a minimal Category 1 hurricane – at 18:00 UTC on October 24.

Early on October 25, the system attained its minimum barometric pressure of 980 mbar (29 inHg). The storm already began weakening and losing tropical characteristics after tracking away from the Gulf Stream. Shortly thereafter, the cyclone made landfall near Rose Blanche-Harbour le Cou, Newfoundland, with winds of 60 mph (95 km/h). By the time it re-emerged into the Atlantic later on October 25, the system had transitioned into an extratropical cyclone. Rainfall spread across Atlantic Canada, peaking at 2.91 in (74 mm) on northeastern Cape Breton Island in Nova Scotia.

=== Other systems ===
The first tropical depression of the season developed north of Puerto Rico on June 9. It headed northward without intensifying and dissipated near Bermuda on the following day. Tropical Depression One existed in June from June 11 to June 16. Another tropical depression developed north of Hispaniola on July 8. It headed northward and then curved northeastward, bypass during the process. By July 13, the depression dissipated while located well south of Newfoundland. A day after the previous tropical depression developed, another depression formed near 10th parallel in the eastern Atlantic on July 9. It headed due westward and dissipated on July 11. A tropical depression formed offshore of Georgia July 10. The system moved north of due east with slight intensification on July 11. It turned east, passing south of Bermuda early on the morning of July 13 while accelerating eastward, with the depression dissipating that afternoon. A tropical depression formed offshore western Africa on July 20. The system moved westward through Cape Verde as a weak system on July 22. The system turned west-northwest and by late on July 25, the depression began to weaken as it turned more to the north, and the system dissipated well to the east-southeast of Bermuda on July 26. Tropical Depression Six developed east of the Lesser Antilles on July 28. The depression moved to the northwest and bypassed Bermuda on August 4. The depression made landfall on the southeastern tip of Newfoundland on August 5 after passing southeast of Nova Scotia earlier that day. Tropical Depression Six became an extratropical cyclone while southeast of Labrador on August 6.

Tropical Depression Eight formed in the Bay of Campeche on August 25. Moving generally northwest, the depression moved into Mexico just south of the international border with the United States late on August 27. Early on the following day, it dissipated inland. In Brownsville, Texas, rainfall accumulations totaled to 2.83 inches (72 mm) on August 27, which was a record amount of precipitation for that date. The last tropical depression in August developed offshore of The Carolinas on August 29. The system quickly moved east-northeast between the East coast North America and Bermuda over the next couple days. The depression became a frontal wave southeast of Newfoundland on September 1, and dissipated soon afterward. Early in September, a tropical depression formed northeast of Cape Verde on September 1. The depression moved west-northwest before recurving sharply while located near the 40th meridian west on September 4. Steadily weakening thereafter over cool waters, the depression dissipated southeast of the Azores on September 6. A tropical depression formed near Cape Verde on September 16 and initially moved northwestward. Once it passed the 50th meridian west, the system turned northward and passed between Bermuda and the Azores. Turning northeast on September 20, the system became an extratropical cyclone, passing northwest of the Azores before dissipating on September 21. A tropical depression formed in the tropical north Atlantic east of the Lesser Antilles on September 21. The system moved northwest over the next few days, staying well east of the Leeward Islands, before dissipating on September 24.

Tropical Depression Fourteen formed on October 12 near Honduras and slowly moved to the northeast towards Cuba. The depression remained south of Cuba and turned back towards the Yucatán Peninsula. The depression made landfall in the Yucatán Peninsula on October 20 and dissipated shortly thereafter. Impact from the depression in this region is unknown. Toward the end of October, a tropical depression formed in the eastern tropical Atlantic on October 22. It moved northwest over the next six days, dissipating on October 28 to the southwest of the Azores. The last tropical depression in October developed near Panama on October 24. The depression initially moved northward toward Cuba, but eventually veered southwestward. By October 29, the depression made landfall in Nicaragua and dissipated several hours later. Impact from this system in Central America is unknown. A subtropical depression formed from an old weather front, or baroclinic zone, on November 6 near Puerto Rico. The depression moved northeastward but appeared to have made contact with the westerlies, as it turned off to the east-northeast. Ships that passed through the system recorded winds of 35-40 mph (55–65 km/h). Early on November 10, the system degenerated to a low pressure area, which soon dissipated. The final tropical depression of the season formed northeast of the Greater Antilles along a frontal zone on November 13. The depression completed a quick recurvature over the next couple days without significant changes in intensity. By November 15, the depression dissipated as a tropical cyclone.

== Storm names ==
The following list of names was used for named storms that formed in the North Atlantic in 1979. This was the first Atlantic hurricane season to utilize both female and male names for tropical storms. Storms were named Ana, Bob, Claudette, David, Frederic, and Henri for the first (and, in the cases of David and Frederic, only) time in 1979. The names Elena and Gloria were previously used under the old naming convention.

- Ana
- Bob
- Claudette
- David
- Elena
- Frederic
- Gloria
- Henri
- Isabel (unused)
- Juan (unused)
- Kate (unused)
- Larry (unused)
- Mindy (unused)
- Nicholas (unused)
- Odette (unused)
- Peter (unused)
- Rose (unused)
- Sam (unused)
- Teresa (unused)
- Victor (unused)
- Wanda (unused)

=== Retirement ===
In the spring of 1980, the World Meteorological Organization retired the names David and Frederic from its rotating name lists due to the deaths and damage they caused, and they will not be used again in the North Atlantic. They were replaced with Danny and Fabian, respectively, for the 1985 season.

== Season effects ==
This is a table of all of the storms that formed in the 1979 Atlantic hurricane season. It includes their name, duration, peak classification and intensities, areas affected, damage, and death totals. Damage and deaths include totals while the storm was extratropical, a wave, or a low, and all of the damage figures are in 1979 USD.

Saffir–Simpson scale
TD	TS	C1	C2	C3	C4	C5

1979 North Atlantic tropical cyclone season statistics
Storm name	Dates active	Storm category at peak intensity	Max 1-min wind mph (km/h)	Min. press. (mbar)	Areas affected	Damage (US$)	Deaths	Ref(s).
Unnumbered	June 9 – June 10	Tropical depression	Unknown	Unknown	None	None	None	
One	June 11 – June 16	Tropical depression	30 (45)	1005	Greater Antilles (Jamaica and Cuba), Bahamas, East Coast of the United States (South Carolina)	$27 million	41	
Ana	June 19 – June 24	Tropical storm	60 (95)	1005	Lesser Antilles	None	None	
Unnumbered	July 8 – July 13	Tropical depression	30 (45)	1004	None	None	None	
Bob	July 9 – July 16	Category 1 hurricane	75 (120)	986	Southern United States (Louisiana), Midwestern United States	$20 million	1	
Unnumbered	July 9 – July 11	Tropical depression	Unknown	Unknown	None	None	None	
Four	July 10 – July 13	Tropical depression	35 (55)	1012	None	None	None	
Claudette	July 15 – July 29	Tropical storm	50 (85)	997	Lesser Antilles, Greater Antilles (Puerto Rico, the Dominican Republic, Cuba), Southern United States (Texas), Eastern United States	$750 million	8	
Unnumbered	July 23 – July 26	Tropical depression	35 (55)	1009	None	None	None	
Six	July 31 – August 6	Tropical depression	35 (55)	1007	Newfoundland	None	None	
David	August 25 – September 6	Category 5 hurricane	175 (280)	924	Lesser Antilles (Dominica), Greater Antilles (Dominican Republic and Cuba), Bahamas, East Coast of the United States (Florida and Georgia)	$1.54 billion	2,078	
Eight	August 25 – August 28	Tropical depression	35 (55)	1006	Mexico (Tamaulipas)	None	None	
Frederic	August 29 – September 14	Category 4 hurricane	130 (215)	943	Lesser Antilles (Saint Barthélemy), Greater Antilles (Puerto Rico, Dominican Republic, Cuba), Eastern United States (Alabama)	$1.72 billion	12	
Elena	August 30 – September 2	Tropical storm	40 (65)	1004	Texas, Louisiana	$10 million	5	
Unnumbered	September 1 – September 6	Tropical depression	35 (55)	1008	None	None	None	
Gloria	September 4 – September 15	Category 2 hurricane	100 (155)	975	None	None	None	
Henri	September 15 – September 24	Category 1 hurricane	85 (140)	983	Mexico, Florida	Minimal	None	
Thirteen	September 16 – September 21	Tropical depression	35 (55)	1008	None	None	None	
Unnumbered	September 19 – September 21	Tropical depression	Unknown	Unknown	Southern United States (Texas)	Unknown	4	
Unnumbered	September 21 – September 24	Tropical depression	Unknown	Unknown	None	None	None	
Fourteen	October 12 – October 20	Tropical depression	35 (55)	1003	Mexico (Quintana Roo)	None	None	
Unnumbered	October 22 – October 28	Tropical depression	Unknown	Unknown	None	None	None	
One	October 23 – October 25	Subtropical storm	75 (120)	980	Atlantic Canada (Newfoundland)	None	None	
Unnumbered	October 24 – October 29	Tropical depression	35 (55)	1006	Nicaragua	None	None	
Fifteen	November 7 – November 10	Tropical depression	35 (55)	998	None	None	None	
Unnumbered	November 13 – November 15	Tropical depression	Unknown	Unknown	None	None	None	
Season aggregates
26 systems	June 9 – November 15		175 (280)	924		$4.07 billion	2,149	

== See also ==
- 1979 Pacific hurricane season
- 1979 Pacific typhoon season
- 1979 North Indian Ocean cyclone season
- South-West Indian Ocean cyclone seasons: 1978–79, 1979–80
- Australian region cyclone seasons: 1978–79, 1979–80
- South Pacific cyclone seasons: 1978–79, 1979–80
- South Atlantic tropical cyclone
- Mediterranean tropical-like cyclone
- 1980 Atlantic hurricane season
