= New Market, Jamaica =

Settlement in Saint Elizabeth Parish, Jamaica

Coordinates: 18.1491°N 77.9034°W

Location of New Market in Jamaica

New Market (also written Newmarket) is a small town in the parish of Saint Elizabeth, Jamaica.

== Name ==
New Market is commonly assumed to have been named after Newmarket, Suffolk, England, however Barry W. Higman and B. J. Hudson suggest that it was named for its location "at an important junction" and its function as "an important small market town."

== History ==
Samuel John Manley, the paternal grandfather of Norman Manley, was a shopkeeper at Kepp, New Market, in the 1860s. His grave was rediscovered in 2016. Another notable local resident was James "Dick" Richards, born in Carr District in the vicinity of New Market, in 1872. He left New Market in 1887 and later became a notable hotelier in Bermuda. On his death in 1965 he bequeathed funds to a local primary school, Beersheba.

In June 1979, New Market was heavily affected by floods induced by Tropical Depression One, which caused the deaths of 41 people across Jamaica. A "lake district" was created at New Market, covering 600 acres of land with water up to 90 feet deep.

Even after some flood waters had receded, the government reported that New Market was still "buried under 80 feet of water." The government proposed to build a new settlement in the area of the town at Mocho, and a new health centre. By February 1980, only half of the flooded areas at New Market were free of water.

The new town was built by the Urban Development Corporation and was named Lewisville after Cleve Lewis, a former member of parliament (MP) for the area and the father of Neville Lewis, the MP at the time of the flood and reconstruction. The market at Lewsville housed "a butchery, a cold storage area and an area set aside for the sale of fish," while the town centre housed a branch of the People's Cooperative Bank, a memorial garden for flood victims, a health centre, police station, and community centre. These were surrounded by 14 house or shop units, valued at between $45,000–$50,000 Jamaican dollars. On 9 December 1983, Lewisville was officially opened by Edward Seaga, the Prime Minister of Jamaica.
