= 1976 Pacific typhoon season =

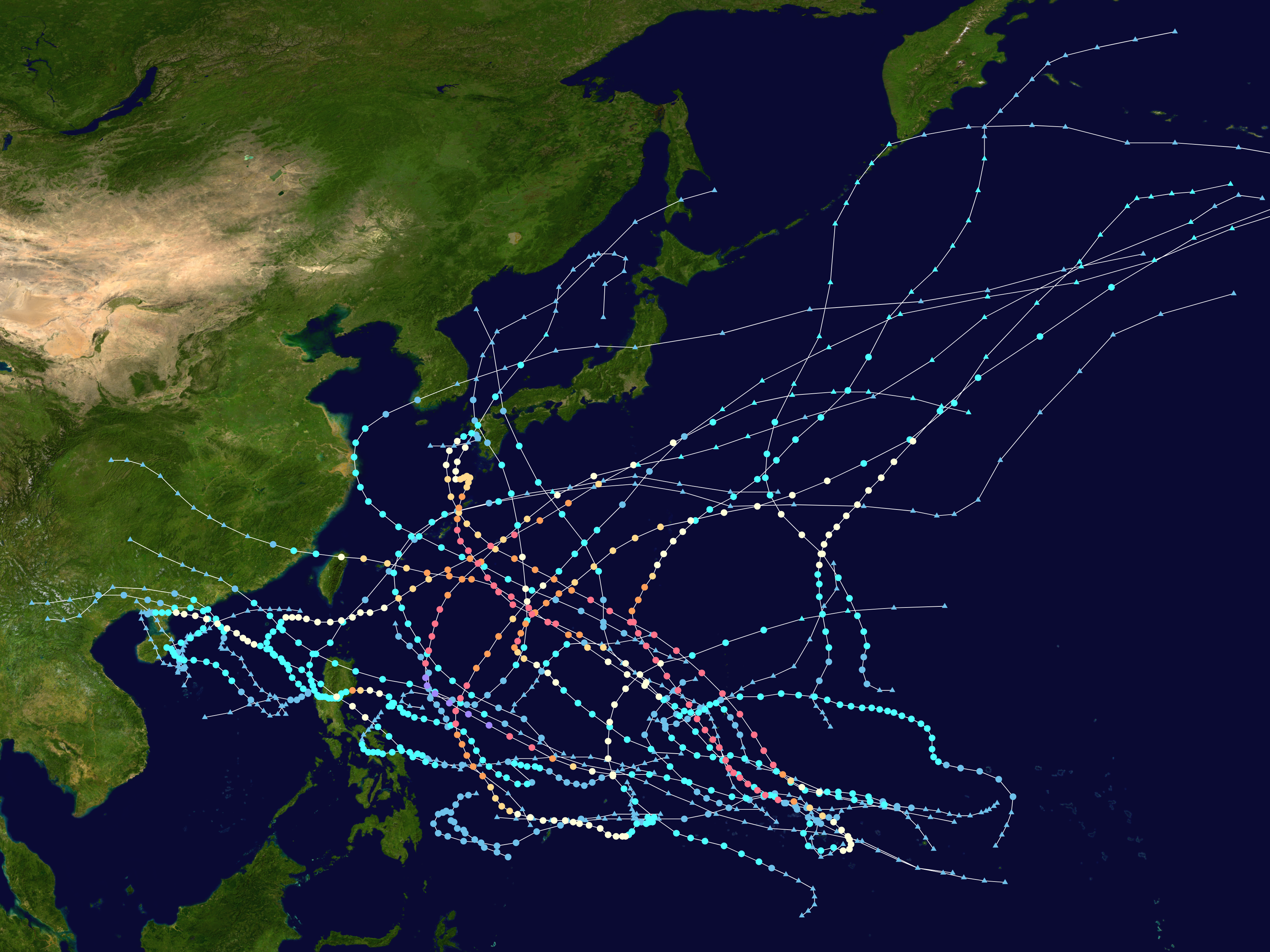
- Season summary map

Seasonal boundaries
- First system formed: January 27, 1976
- Last system dissipated: December 30, 1976

Strongest storm
- Name: Louise
  - Maximum winds: 260 km/h (160 mph) (1-minute sustained)
  - Lowest pressure: 895 hPa (mbar)

Seasonal statistics
- Total depressions: 51
- Total storms: 25
- Typhoons: 15
- Total fatalities: >650
- Total damage: > $1.162 billion (1976 USD)

Related articles
- 1976 Atlantic hurricane season; 1976 Pacific hurricane season; 1976 North Indian Ocean cyclone season

The 1976 Pacific typhoon season has no official bounds; it ran year-round in 1976, but most tropical cyclones tend to form in the northwestern Pacific Ocean between June and December. These dates conventionally delimit the period of each year when most tropical cyclones form in the northwestern Pacific Ocean. This season was near average, with 25 named storms, 15 typhoons and 4 super typhoons.

The scope of this article is limited to the Pacific Ocean, north of the equator and west of the International Date Line. Storms that form east of the date line and north of the equator are called hurricanes; see 1976 Pacific hurricane season. Tropical Storms formed in the entire west pacific basin were assigned a name by the Joint Typhoon Warning Center. Tropical depressions in this basin have the "W" suffix added to their number. Tropical depressions that enter or form in the Philippine area of responsibility are assigned a name by the Philippine Atmospheric, Geophysical and Astronomical Services Administration or PAGASA. This can often result in the same storm having two names.

== Seasonal summary ==
25 tropical storms formed this year in the Western Pacific. 14 storms reached typhoon intensity, of which 4 reached super typhoon strength.

== Systems ==
=== Typhoon Kathy ===
- Typhoon (JMA)
- Category 1-equivalent typhoon (SSHWS)
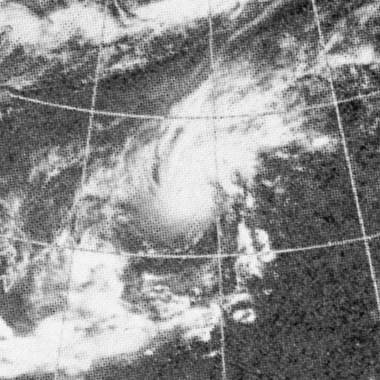
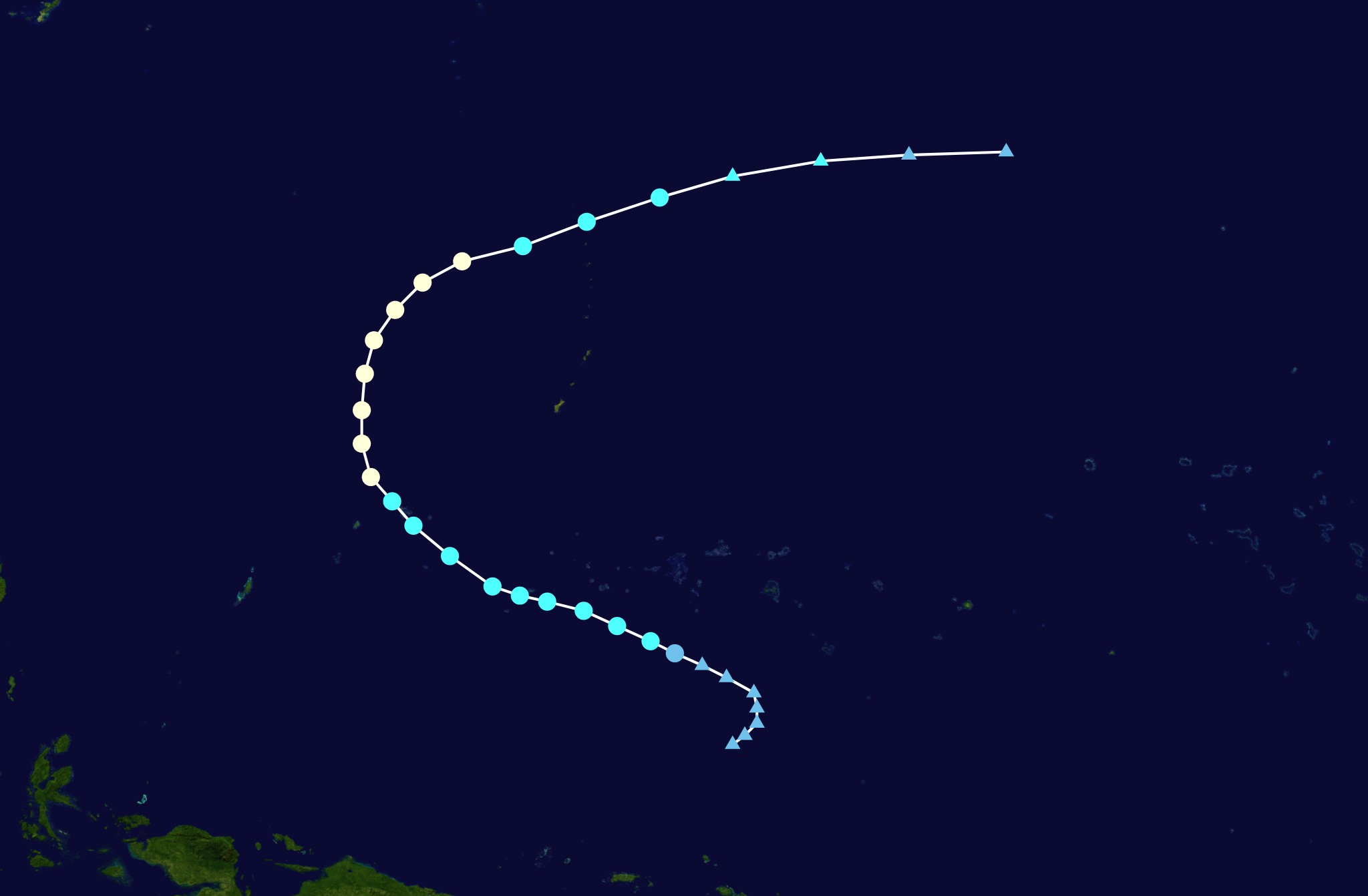
- Duration: January 26 – February 2
- Peak intensity: 150 km/h (90 mph) (1-min); 965 hPa (mbar)

Typhoon Kathy was a Category 1 typhoon that stayed at sea for its entire life.

=== Tropical Depression Asiang ===
- Tropical depression (PAGASA)
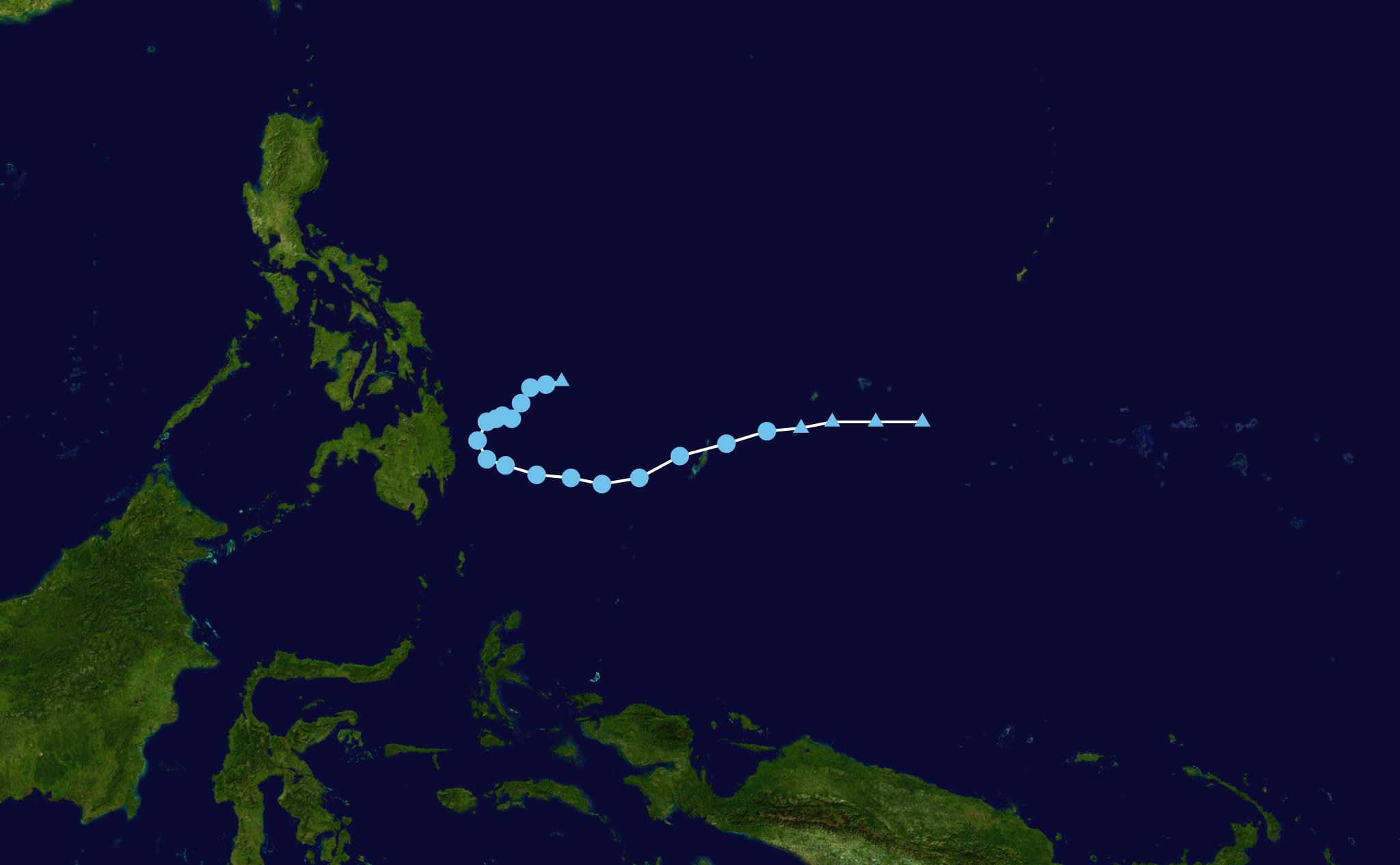
- Duration: January 26 – February 1
- Peak intensity: 55 km/h (35 mph) (10-min);

Asiang was a Tropical Depression. It was named by PAGASA.

=== Tropical Depression Biring ===
- Tropical depression (PAGASA)
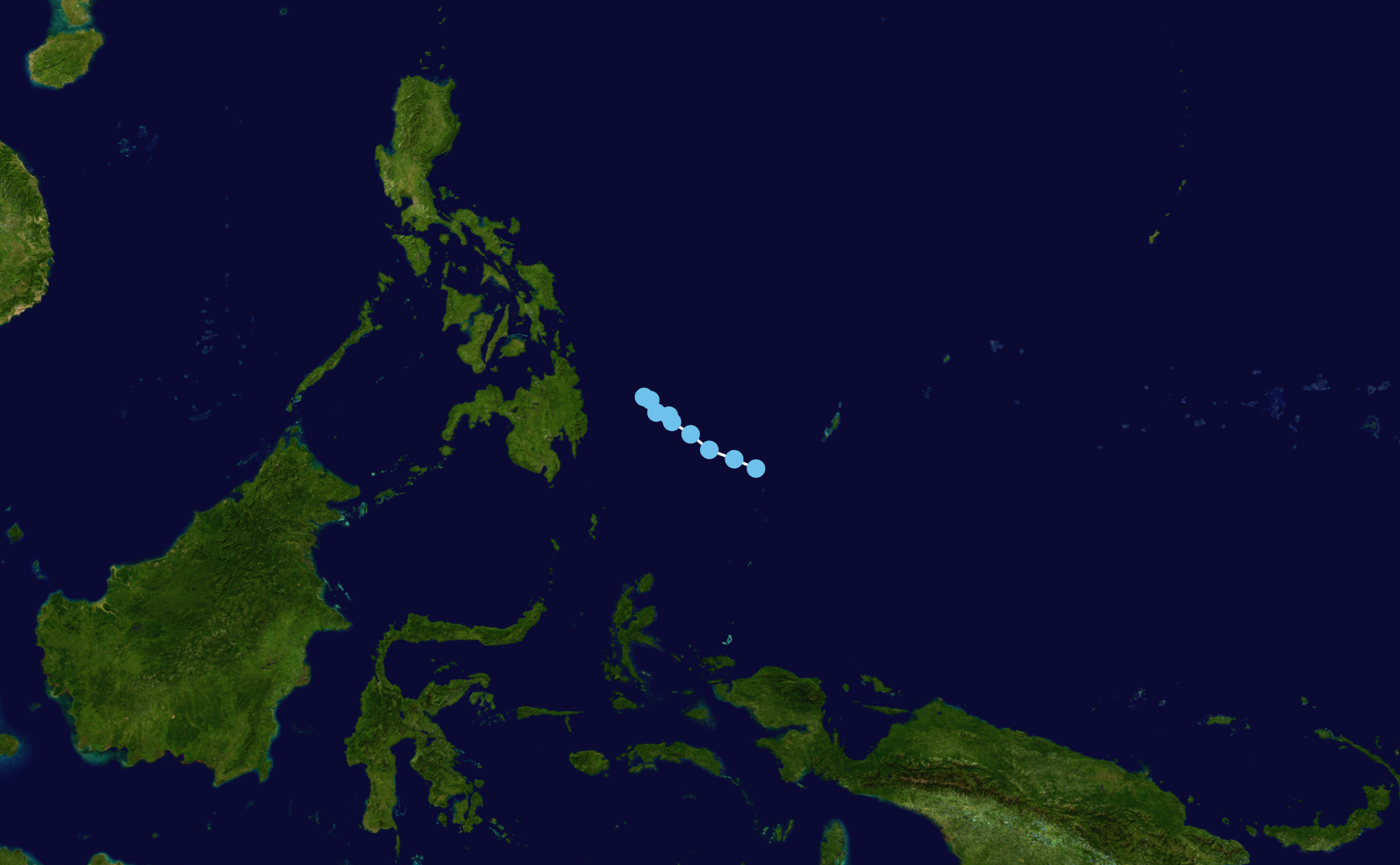
- Duration: February 8 – February 11
- Peak intensity: 55 km/h (35 mph) (10-min);

Biring was also named by PAGASA.

=== Tropical Storm Lorna ===
- Tropical storm (JMA)
- Tropical storm (SSHWS)
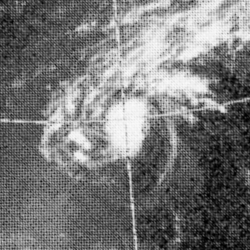
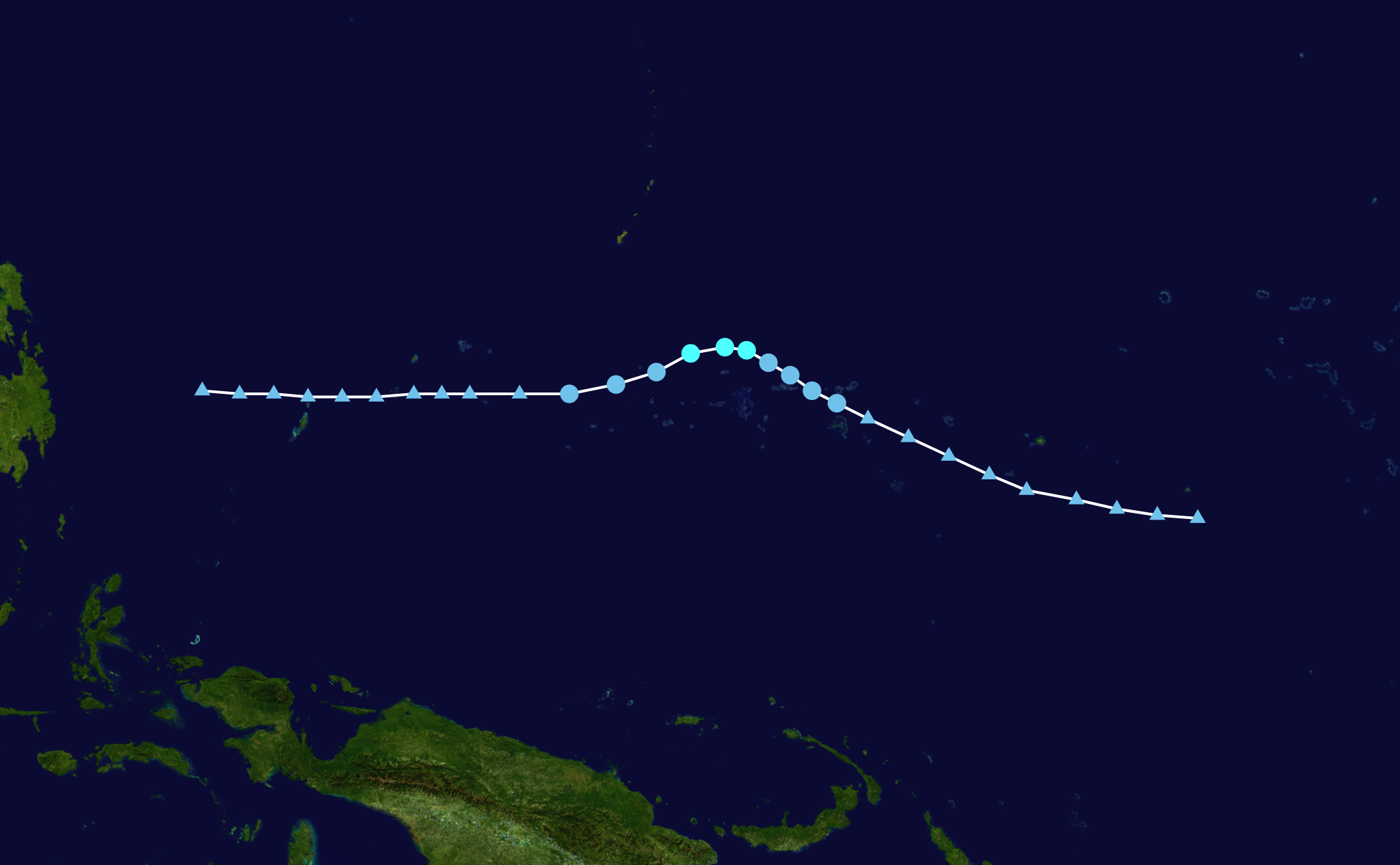
- Duration: February 25 – March 3
- Peak intensity: 65 km/h (40 mph) (1-min); 998 hPa (mbar)

Lorna was a weak tropical storm with wins of 65 km/h.

=== Typhoon Marie (Konsing) ===
- Typhoon (JMA)
- Category 4-equivalent typhoon (SSHWS)
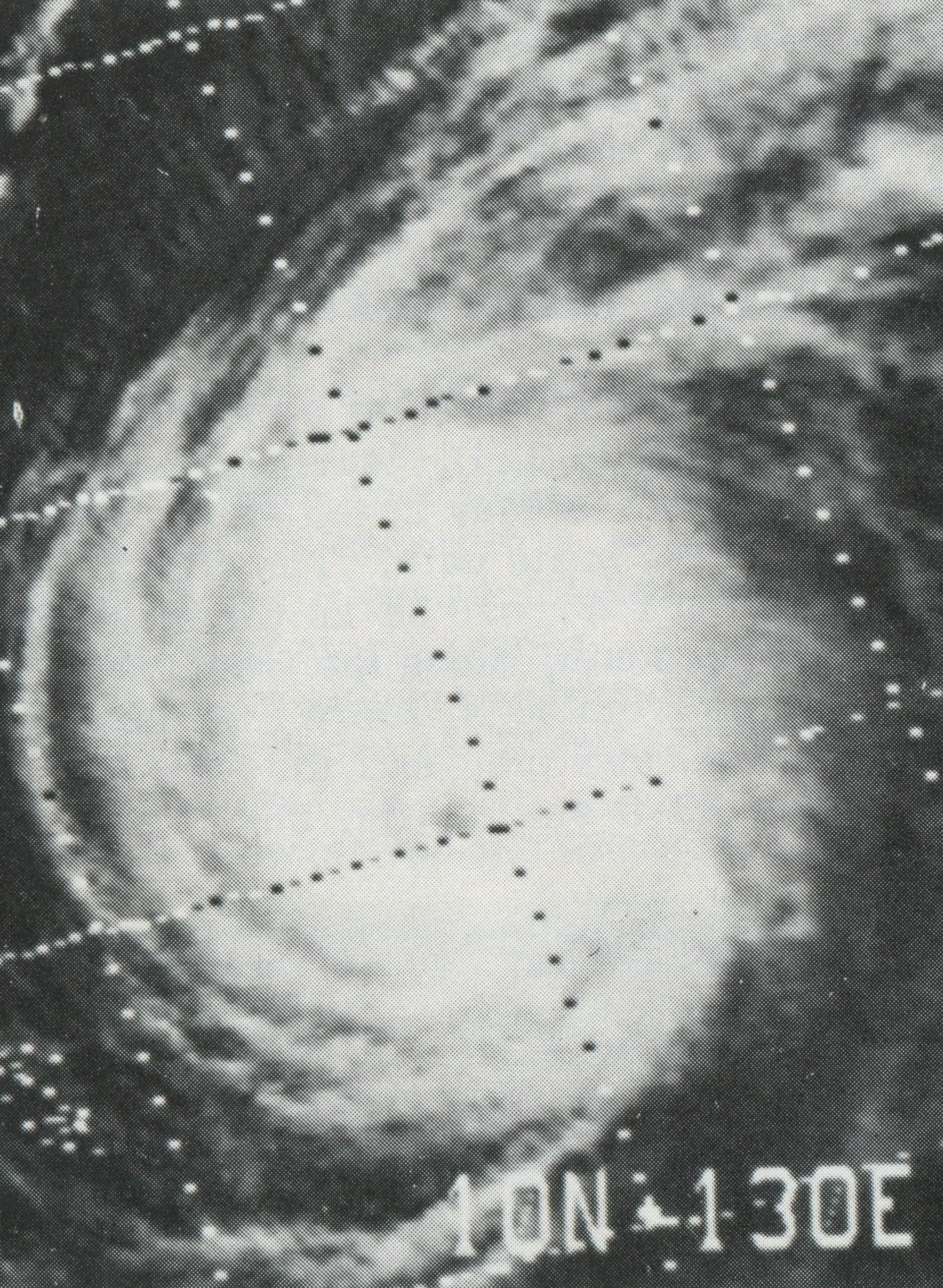
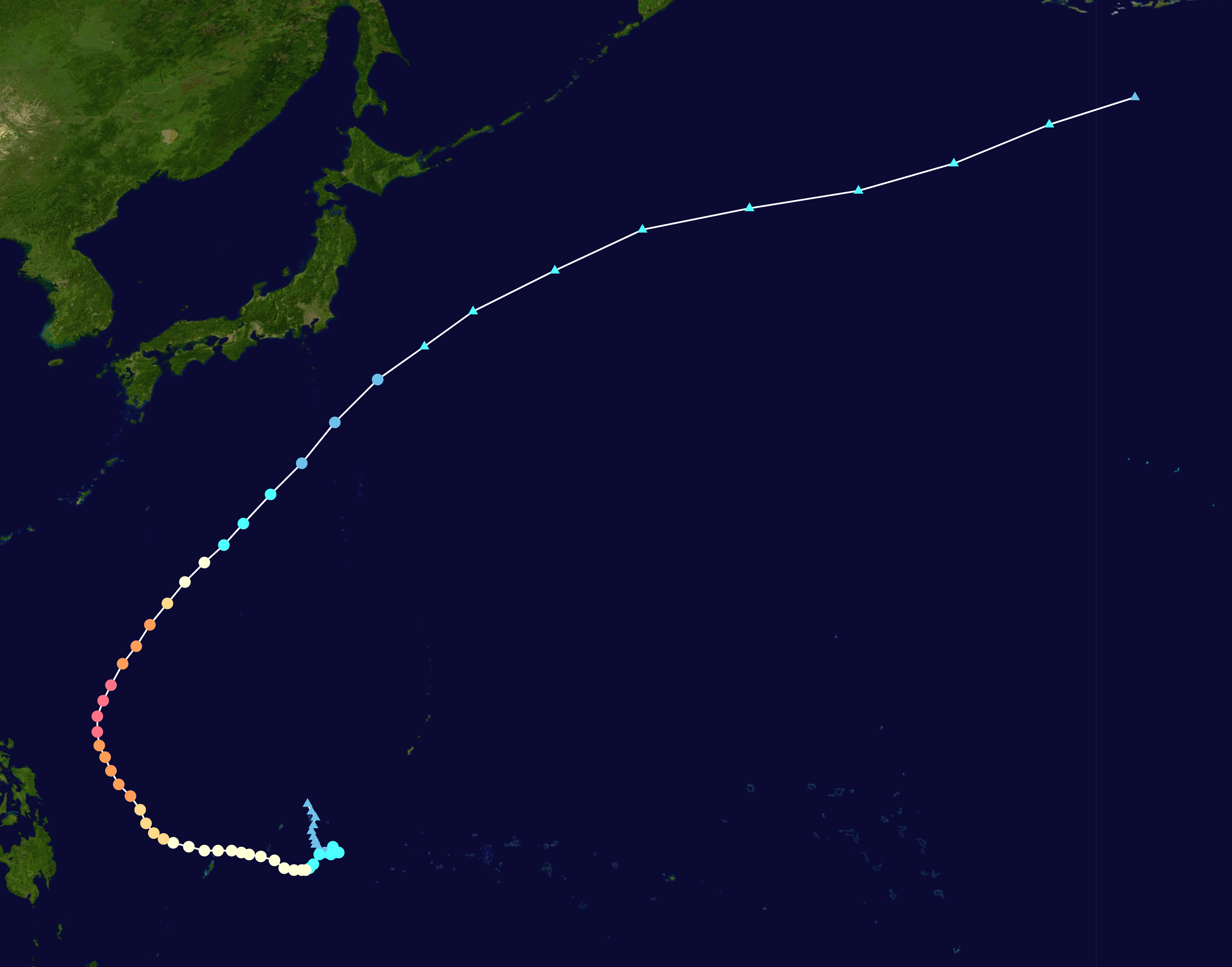
- Duration: April 1 – April 16
- Peak intensity: 215 km/h (130 mph) (1-min); 930 hPa (mbar)

This category 4 typhoon affected the Philippines; but mostly stayed out to sea. Marie did not reach super typhoon status; but recorded a strong pressure of 930 millibars. Marie was the first category 4 of the season.

=== Severe Tropical Storm Nancy ===
- Severe tropical storm (JMA)
- Tropical storm (SSHWS)
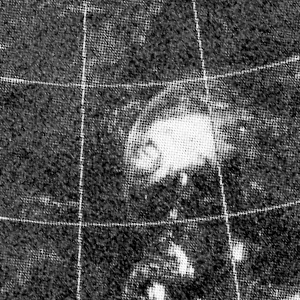
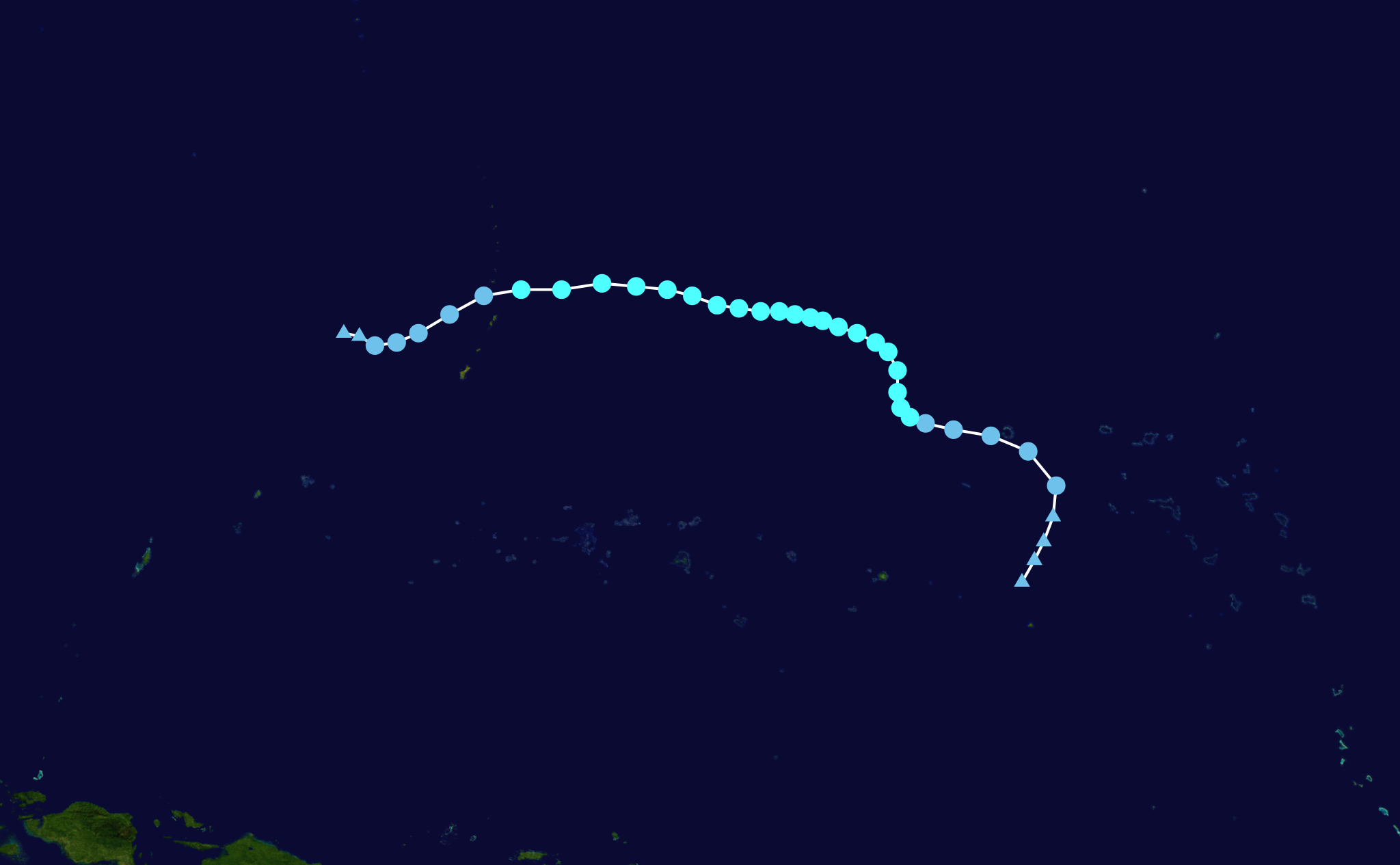
- Duration: April 24 – May 3
- Peak intensity: 100 km/h (65 mph) (1-min); 985 hPa (mbar)

Nancy stayed at sea.

=== Typhoon Olga (Didang) ===
- Typhoon (JMA)
- Category 3-equivalent typhoon (SSHWS)
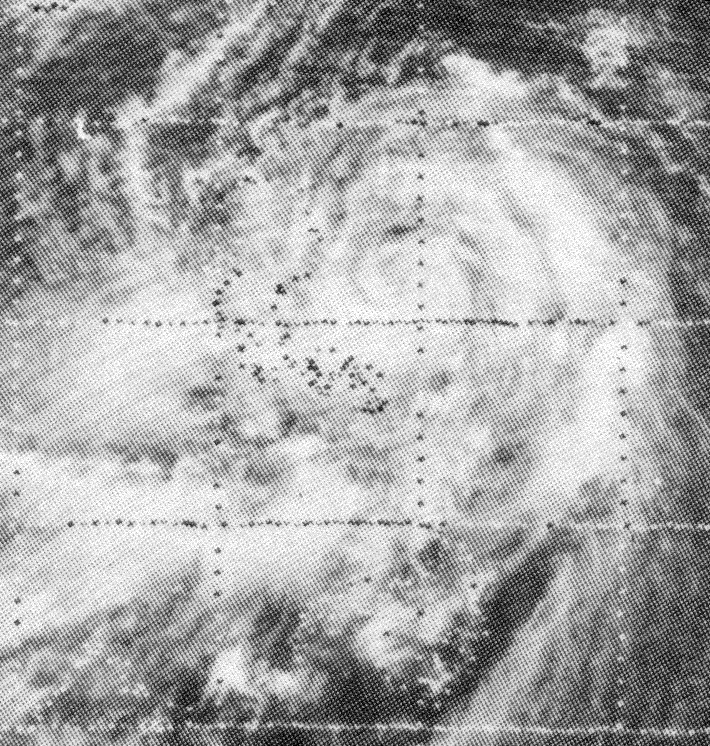
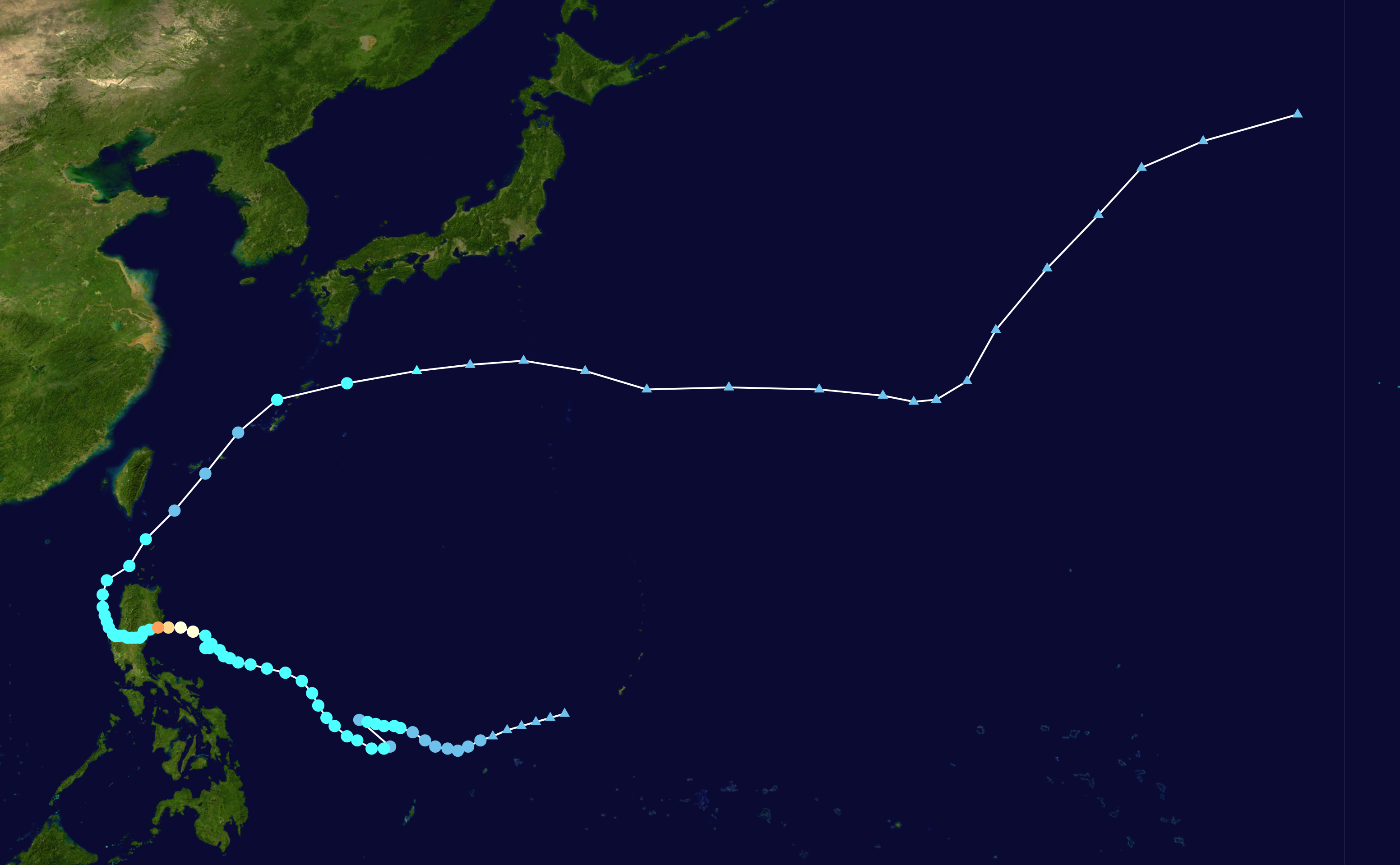
- Duration: May 10 – May 28
- Peak intensity: 185 km/h (115 mph) (1-min); 940 hPa (mbar)

The monsoon trough spawned a tropical depression east of the Philippines on May 10. It tracked generally westward, reaching tropical storm status on the 13th while remaining poorly organized. On the 14th Olga relocated to the southeast, and regained tropical storm strength after weakening. The storm headed to the northwest, and looped in response to the approach of a long wave trough. After returning to a westward movement Olga, despite unfavorable wind shear, strengthened to a typhoon on the 20th. It rapidly intensified that night, and hit eastern Luzon early on the 21st as a 115 mph (185 km/h) typhoon. It drifted across the island, and turned northward in the South China Sea. Olga moved rapidly to the northeast, and on the 28th Olga was absorbed by a subtropical disturbance. Olga brought torrential flooding, at some points as much as 50 inches (1,300 mm) of rain. Because of this, 374 people were killed and thousands were left homeless. Olga also destroyed many of the sets used during the filming of Apocalypse Now.

=== Typhoon Pamela ===
- Typhoon (JMA)
- Category 4-equivalent typhoon (SSHWS)
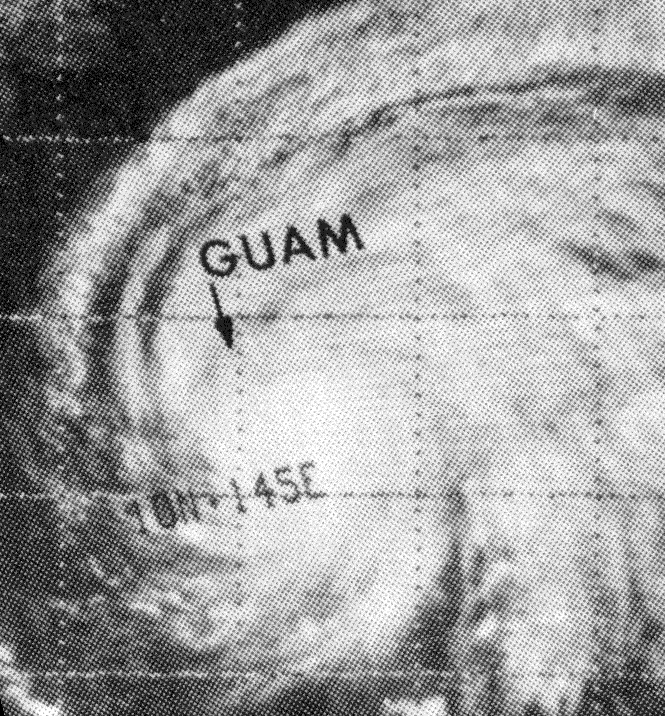
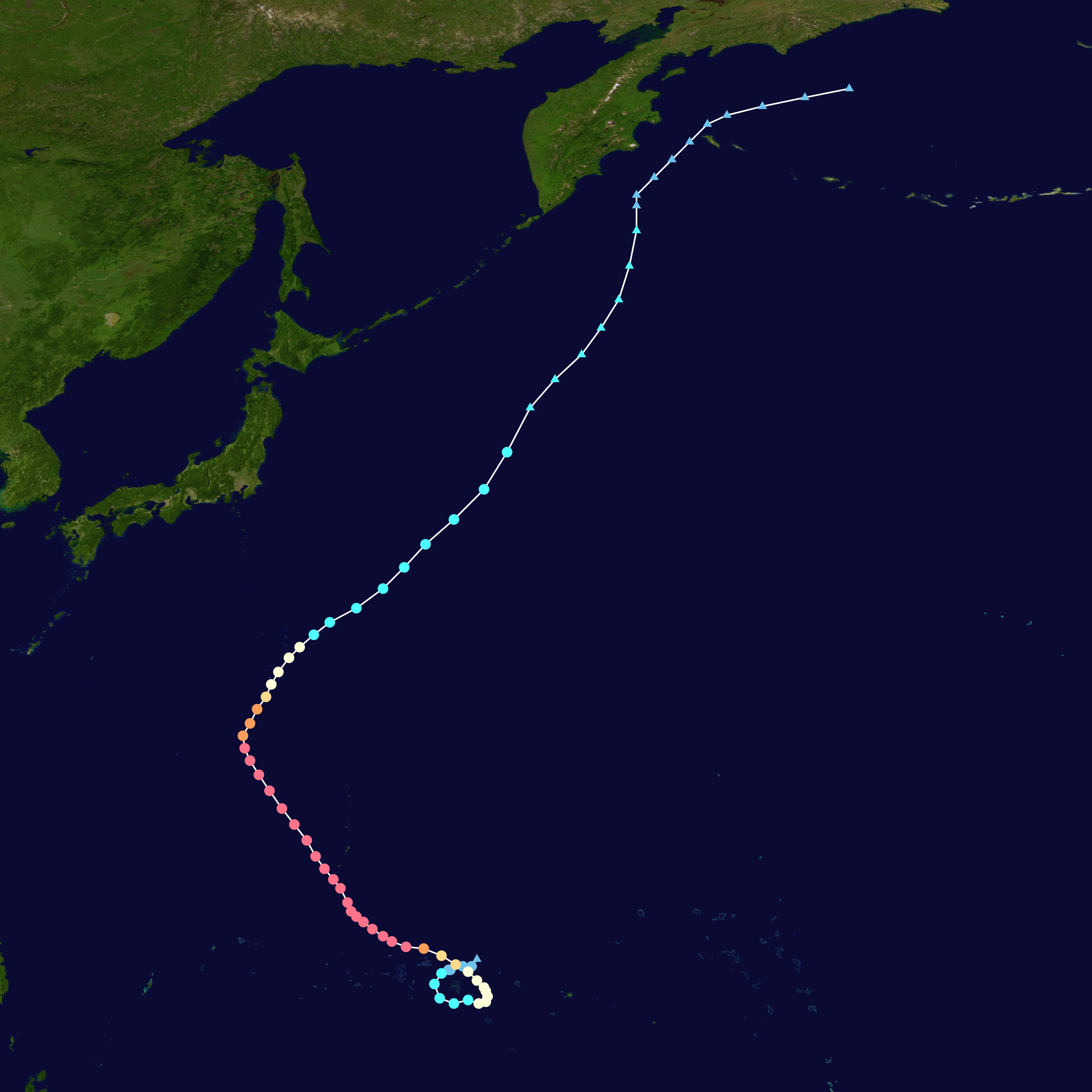
- Duration: May 14 – May 29
- Peak intensity: 240 km/h (150 mph) (1-min); 920 hPa (mbar)

The near equatorial trough produced a tropical depression on May 14 north of Chuuk. It moved southwestward, becoming a tropical storm on the 15th. Pamela slowly looped to the northwest, and reached typhoon status on the 16th. On the 18th and 19th, Pamela rapidly intensified to a 150 mph (240 km/h) super typhoon, and slowly weakened as it continued its northwest movement. On May 21 the typhoon crossed Guam with sustained winds of 140 mph (230 km/h). After slowly crossing the island, Pamela turned to the north, and weakened until becoming extratropical on the 26th. Pamela was the strongest typhoon to hit Guam since Super Typhoon Karen in 1962. Though Karen was much stronger, Pamela's slow crossing caused much more damage, amounting to $500 million (1976 USD, $1.7 billion 2005 USD). Well-executed warnings allowed for only one death in Guam. Before Typhoon Pamela hit Guam, ten people died in a landslide in Truk (Chuuk) from its heavy rains.

=== Tropical Depression Gloring ===
- Tropical depression (PAGASA)
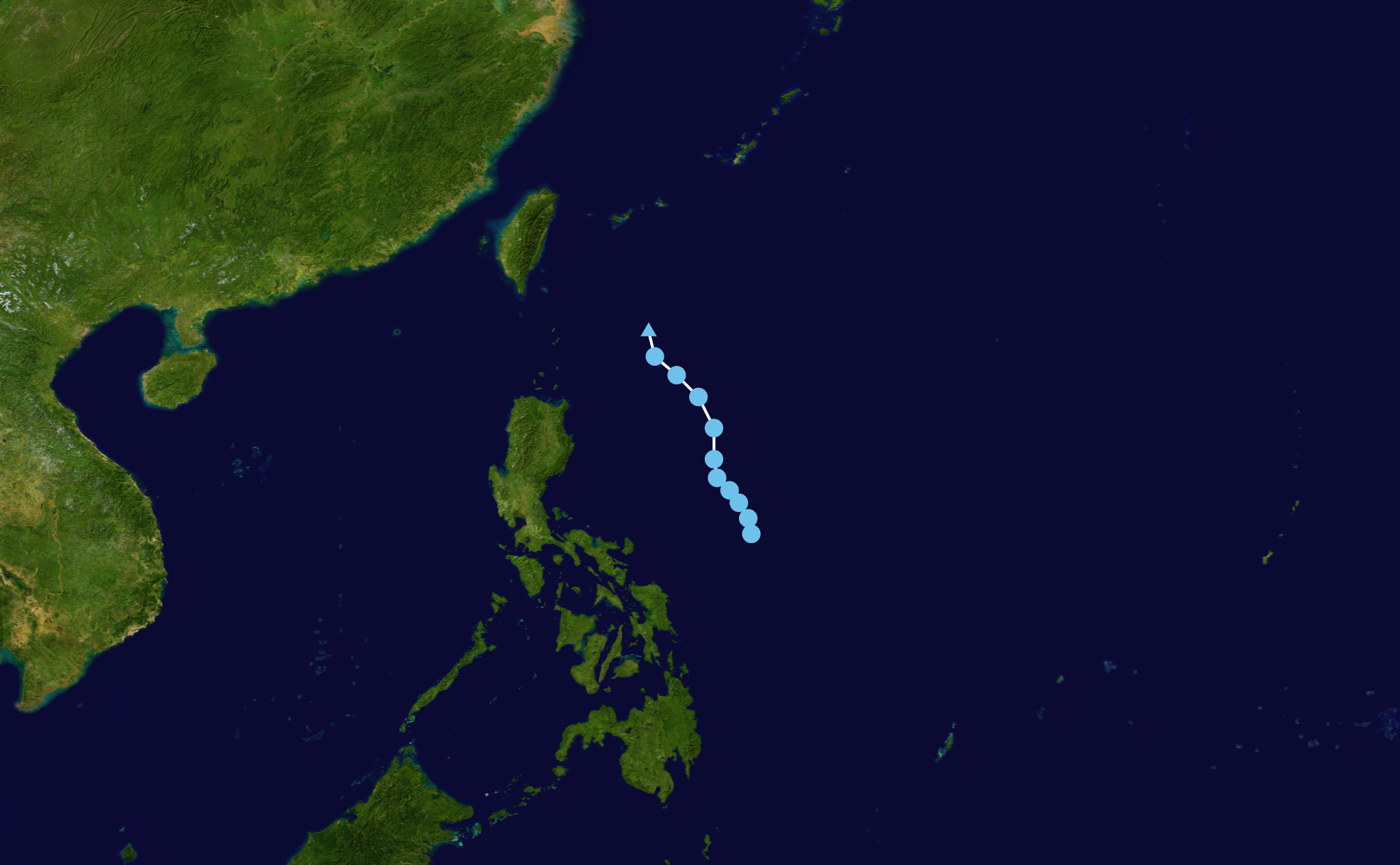
- Duration: June 15 – June 18
- Peak intensity: 55 km/h (35 mph) (10-min);

Named by PAGASA.

=== Typhoon Ruby (Huaning) ===
- Typhoon (JMA)
- Category 4-equivalent typhoon (SSHWS)
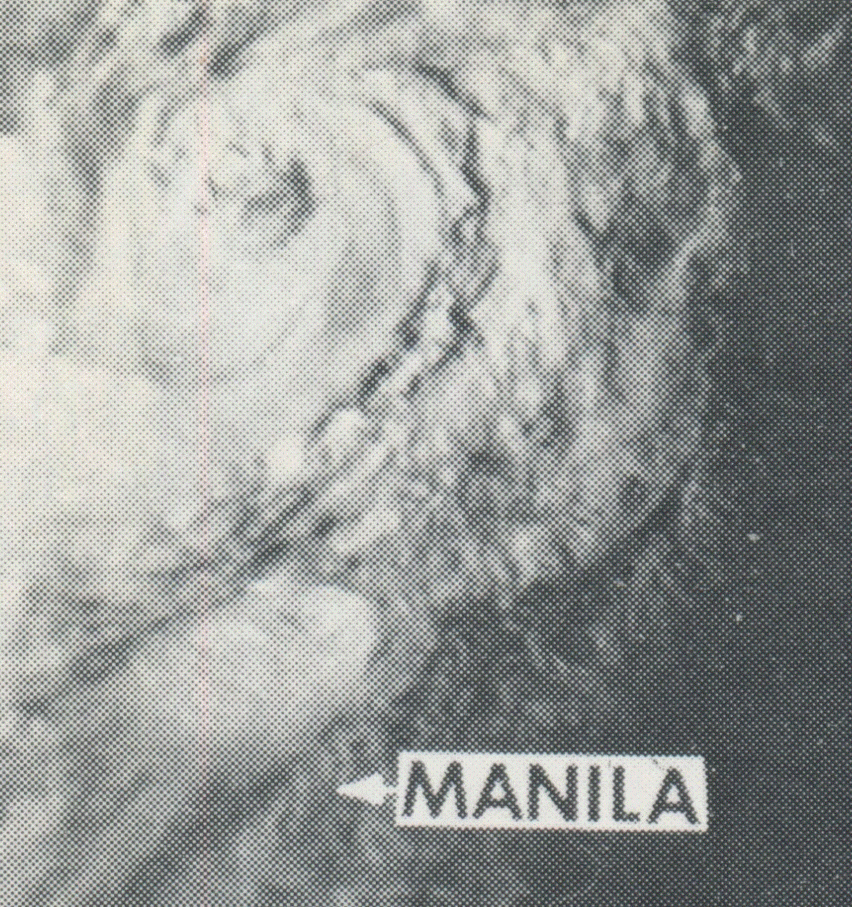
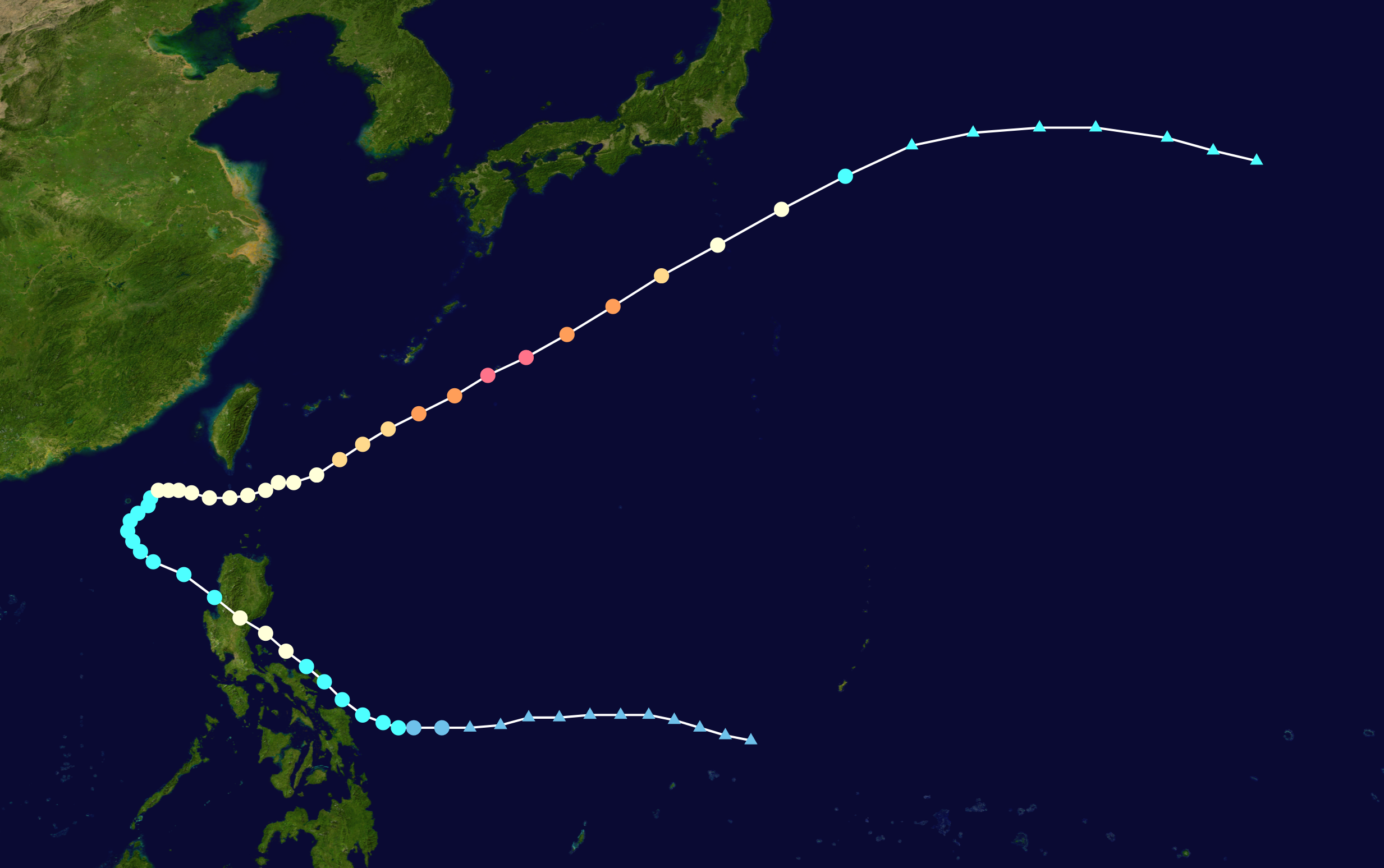
- Duration: June 20 – July 5
- Peak intensity: 220 km/h (140 mph) (1-min); 935 hPa (mbar)

The monsoon trough spawned Tropical Depression 7W on June 20. It headed westward, slowly organizing into a tropical storm on the 23rd. Ruby turned to the northwest, and reached typhoon strength just before hitting Luzon on the 25th. It crossed the island, weakening to a tropical storm before turning to the northeast in the South China Sea. Ruby again became a typhoon on the 28th, and on July 2, the typhoon reached a peak of 140 mph (230 km/h) winds while south of Japan. The typhoon turned to the east, and became extratropical on the 3rd. 16 people were killed from the typhoon.

=== Typhoon Sally (Isang) ===
- Typhoon (JMA)
- Category 4-equivalent typhoon (SSHWS)
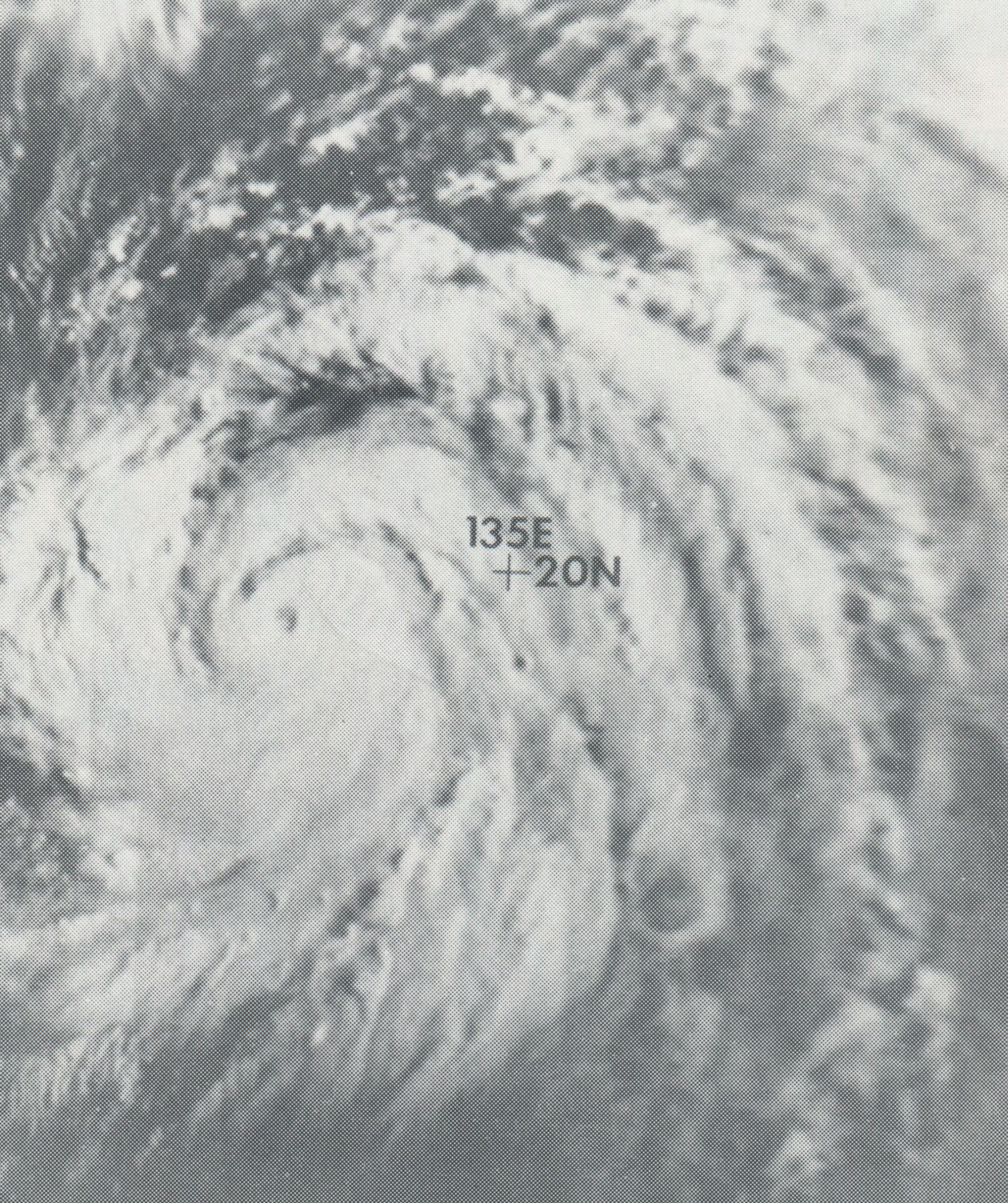
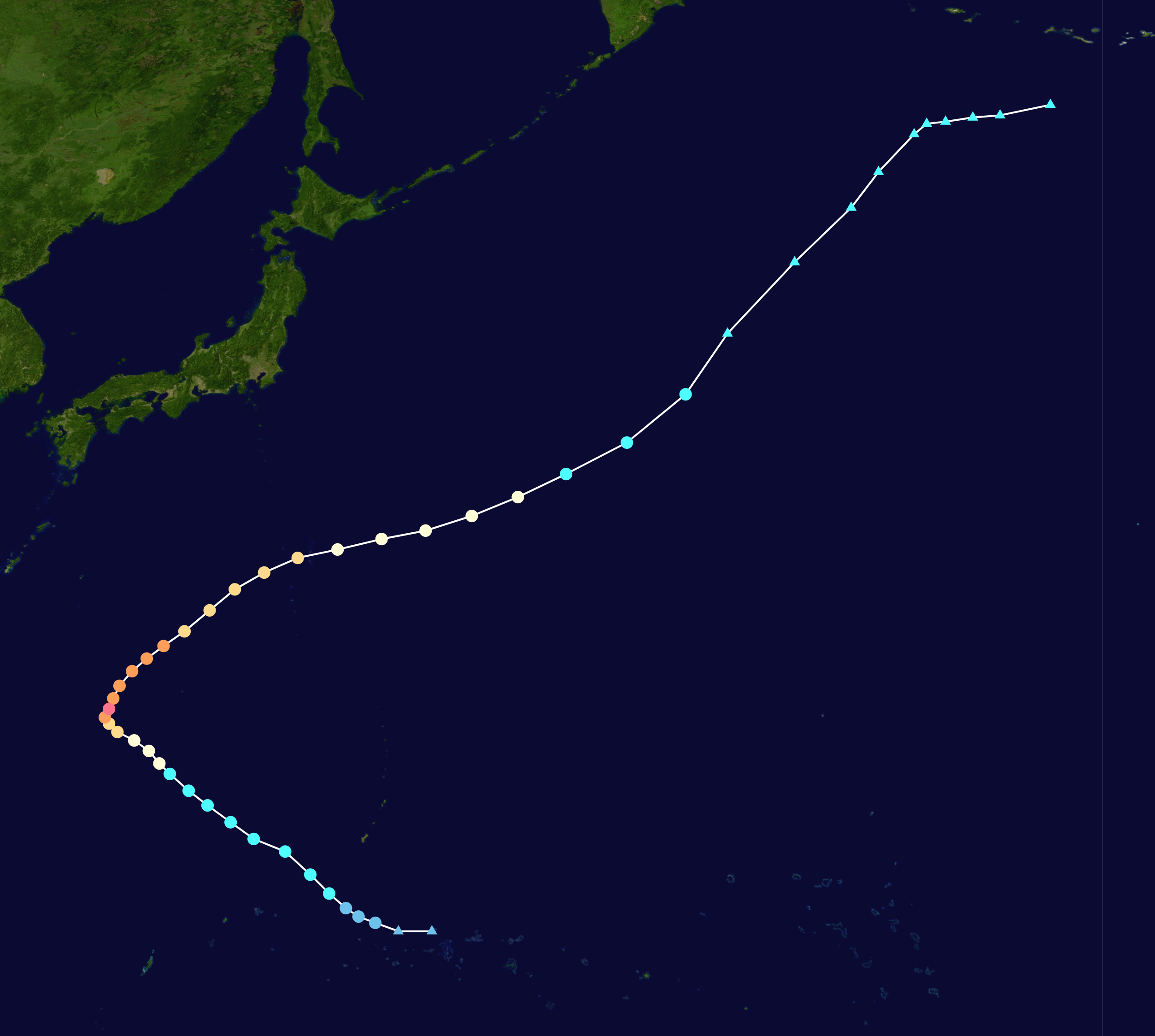
- Duration: June 24 – July 5
- Peak intensity: 215 km/h (130 mph) (1-min); 925 hPa (mbar)

Typhoon Sally formed on June 24. The storm was a Category 4 typhoon with 130 miles per hour of 1-minute sustained wind and 925 millibars of central pressure which did not threaten land.

=== Typhoon Therese ===
- Typhoon (JMA)
- Category 4-equivalent typhoon (SSHWS)
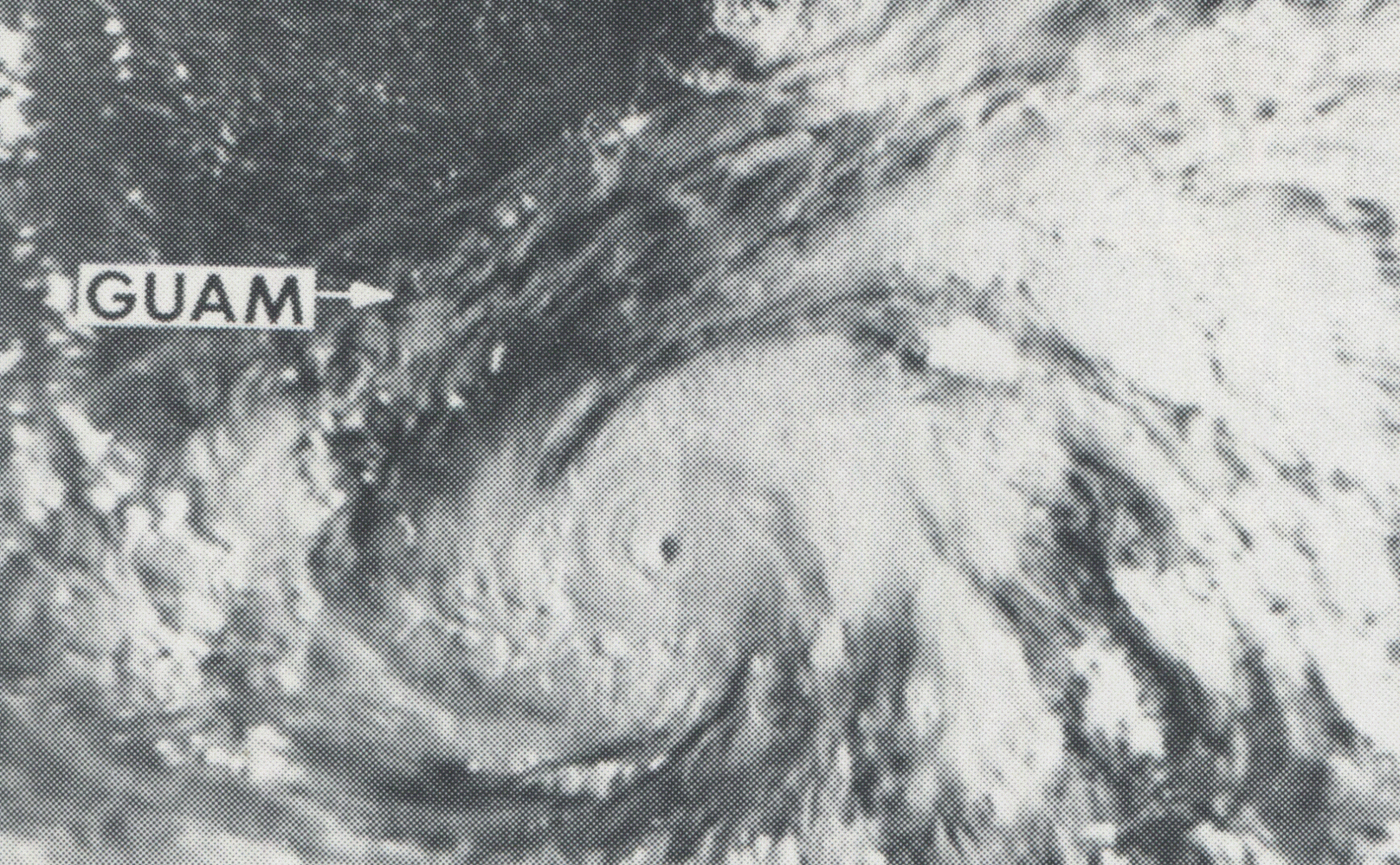
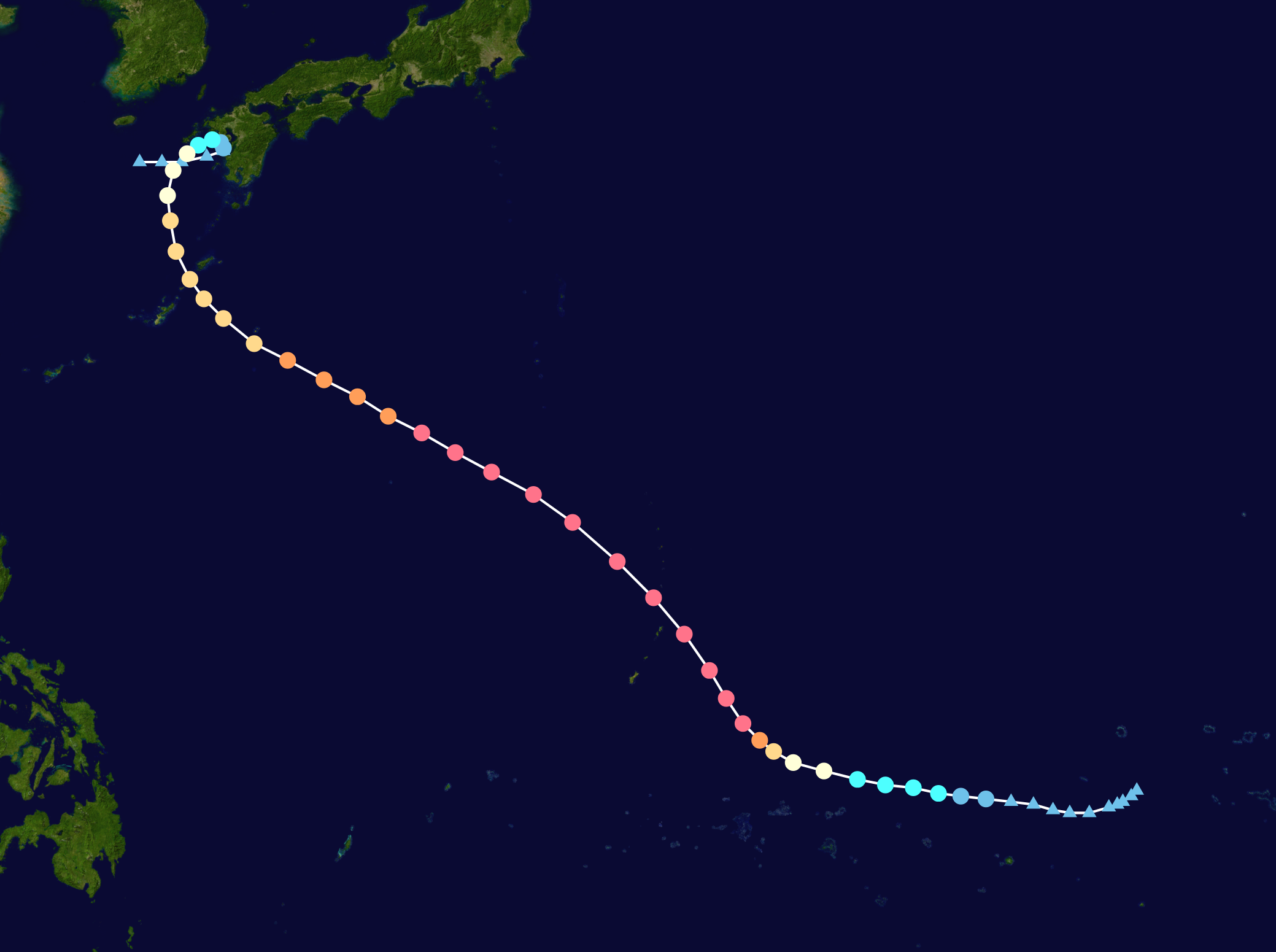
- Duration: July 8 – July 21
- Peak intensity: 250 km/h (155 mph) (1-min); 905 hPa (mbar)

Typhoon Therese, which developed on July 8, explosively deepened on the 12th and 13th to a 155 mph (249 km/h) super typhoon. Therese weakened as it continued to the northwest, and struck southwest Japan on the 19th as a tropical storm. It looped to the west, and dissipated on the 21st. Therese caused heavy flooding, killing 3 people and causing millions in damage. The storm was a Category 4 typhoon at peak, with 1-minute sustained winds of up to 155 miles per hour and a central pressure of 905 millibars.

=== Severe Tropical Storm Violet (Lusing) ===
- Severe tropical storm (JMA)
- Tropical storm (SSHWS)
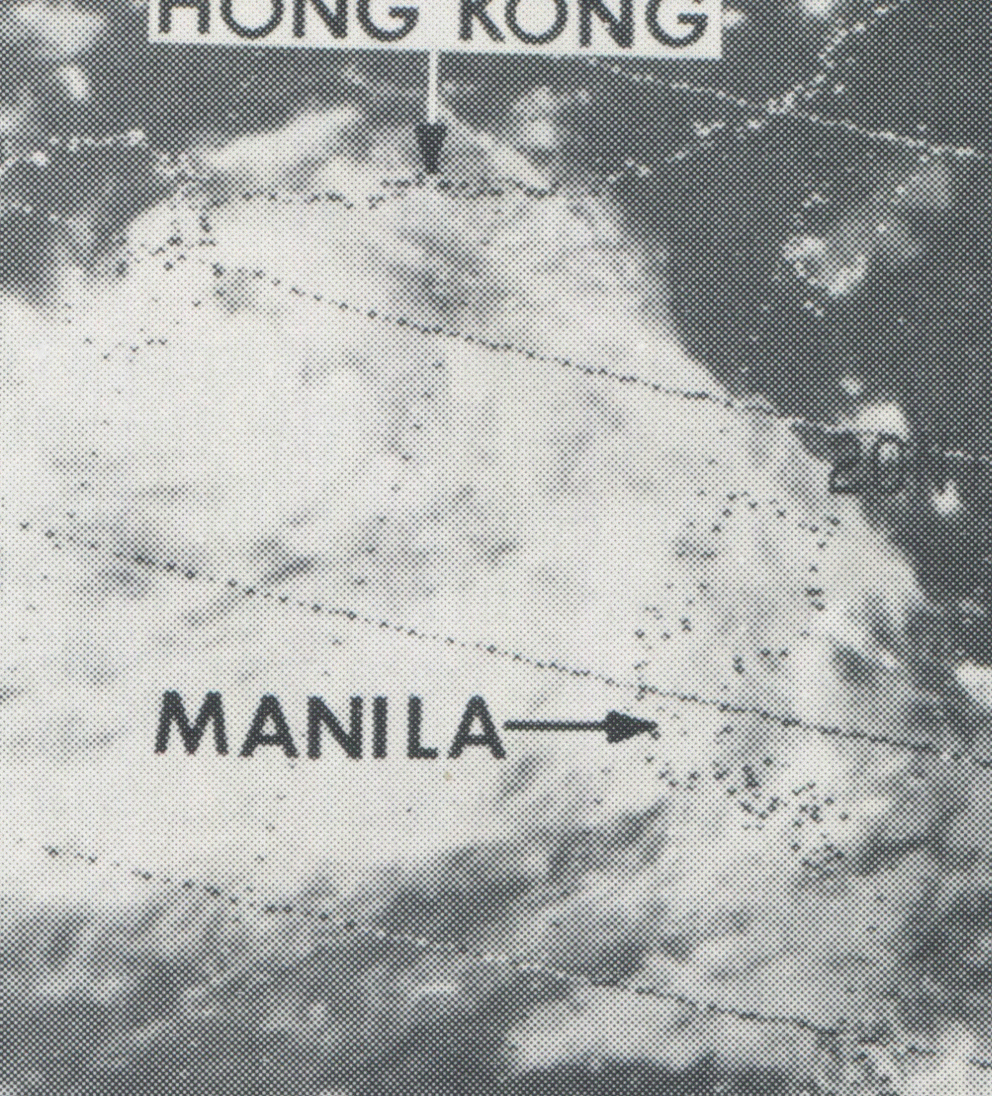
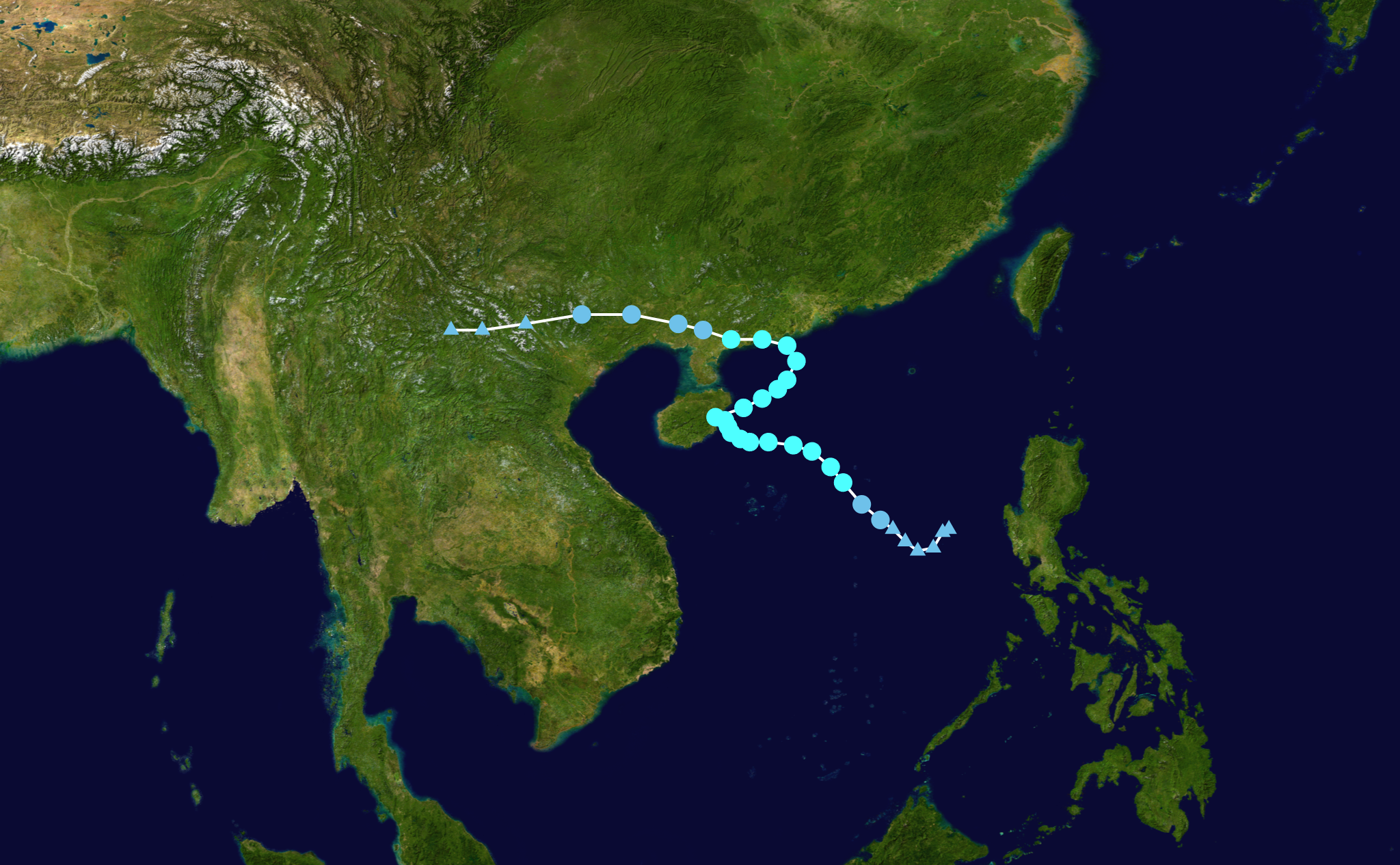
- Duration: July 20 – July 27
- Peak intensity: 100 km/h (65 mph) (1-min); 985 hPa (mbar)

Tropical Storm Violet struck Hong Kong and Hainan Island killing 2 people.

=== Severe Tropical Storm Wilda ===
- Severe tropical storm (JMA)
- Tropical storm (SSHWS)
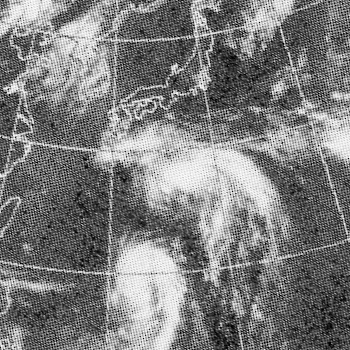
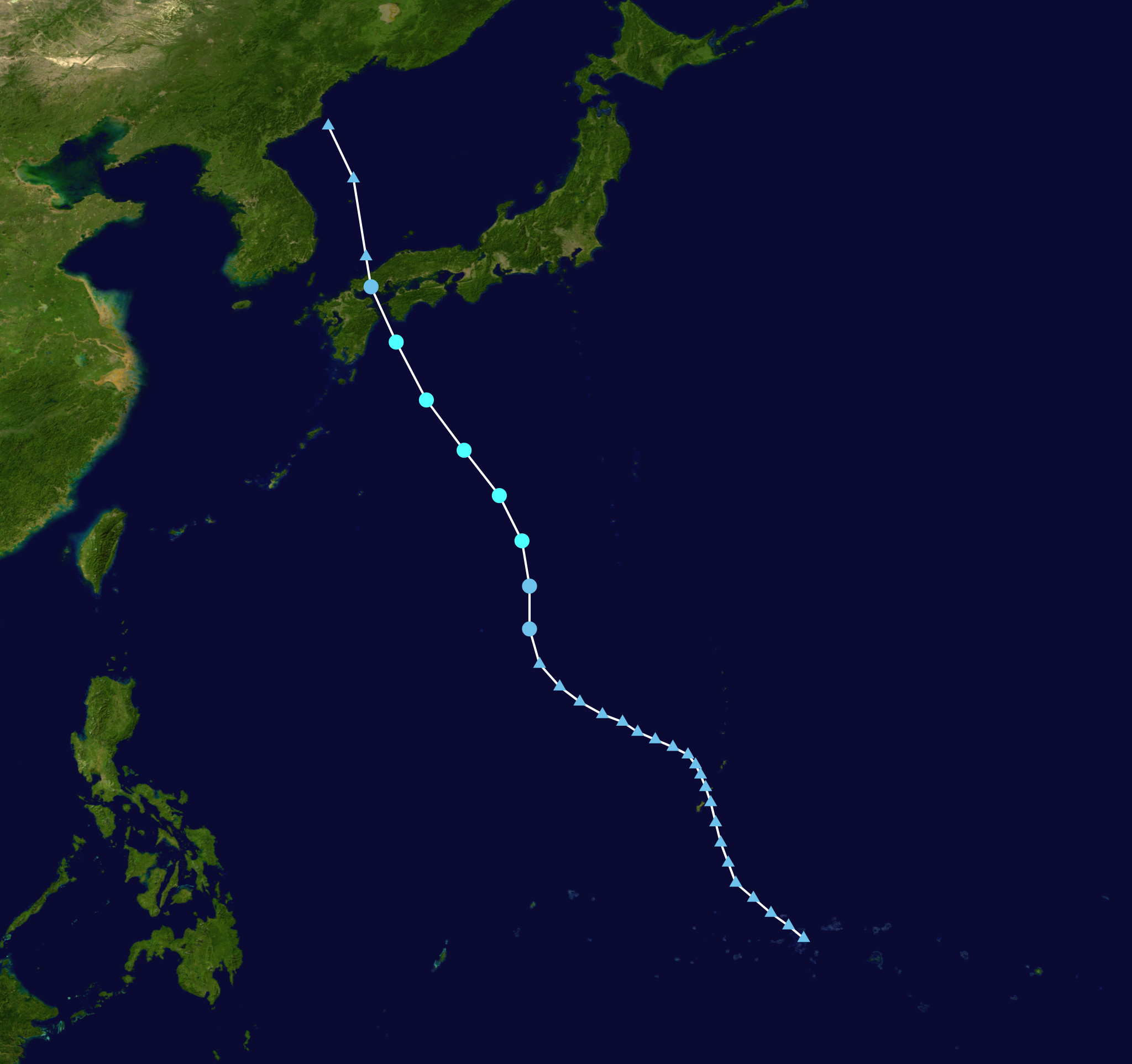
- Duration: July 17 – July 24
- Peak intensity: 85 km/h (50 mph) (1-min); 985 hPa (mbar)

Tropical Storm Wilda hit Japan. The storm had a maximum 1-minute sustained wind speed of 50 miles per hour and a central pressure of 985 millibars.

=== Typhoon Anita (Maring) ===
- Typhoon (JMA)
- Category 1-equivalent typhoon (SSHWS)
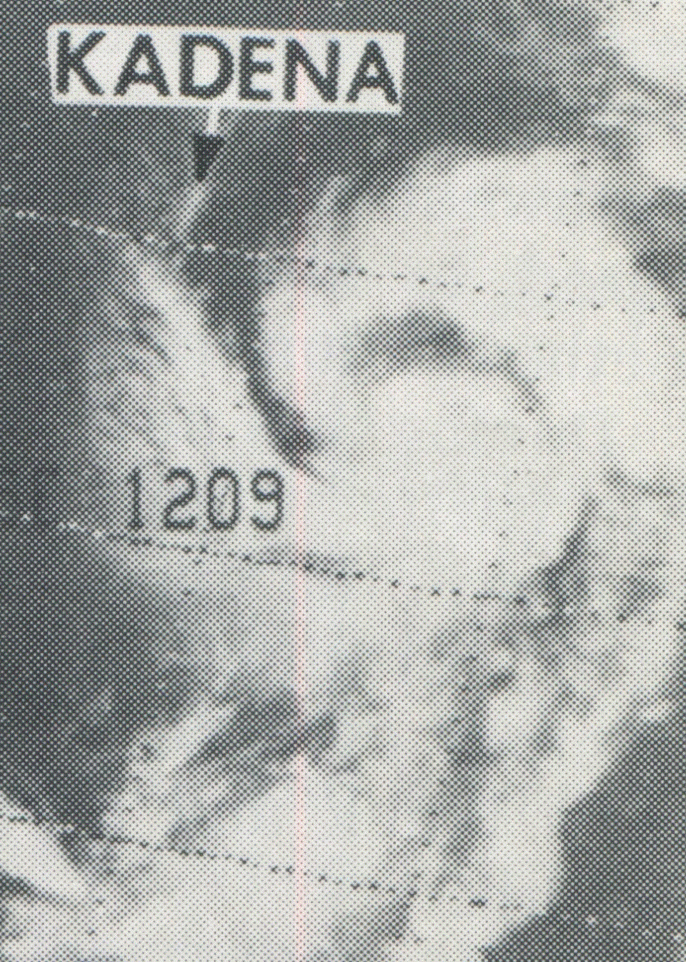
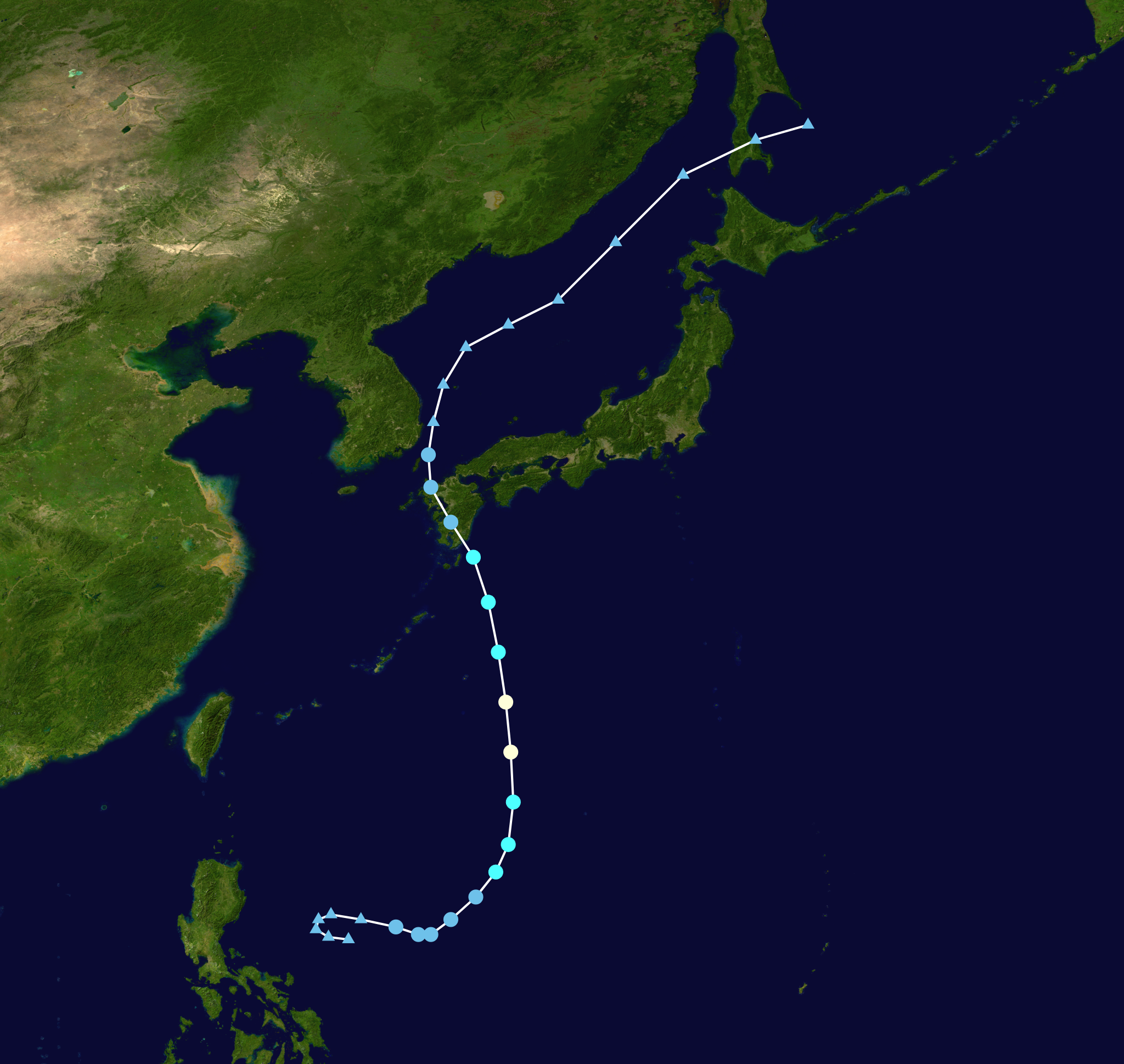
- Duration: July 20 – July 27
- Peak intensity: 120 km/h (75 mph) (1-min); 980 hPa (mbar)

Anita hit Japan.

=== Typhoon Billie (Nitang) ===
- Typhoon (JMA)
- Category 4-equivalent typhoon (SSHWS)
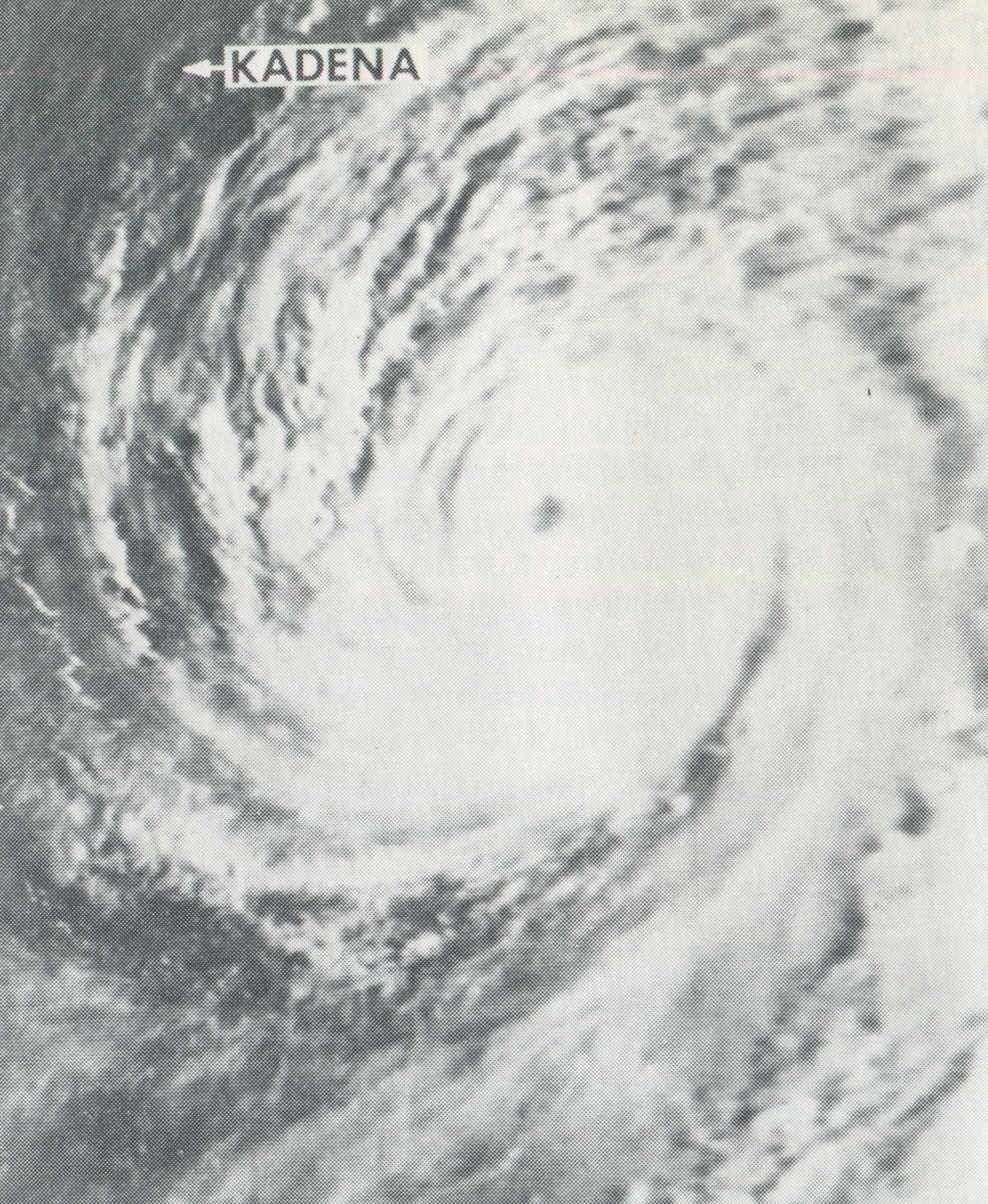
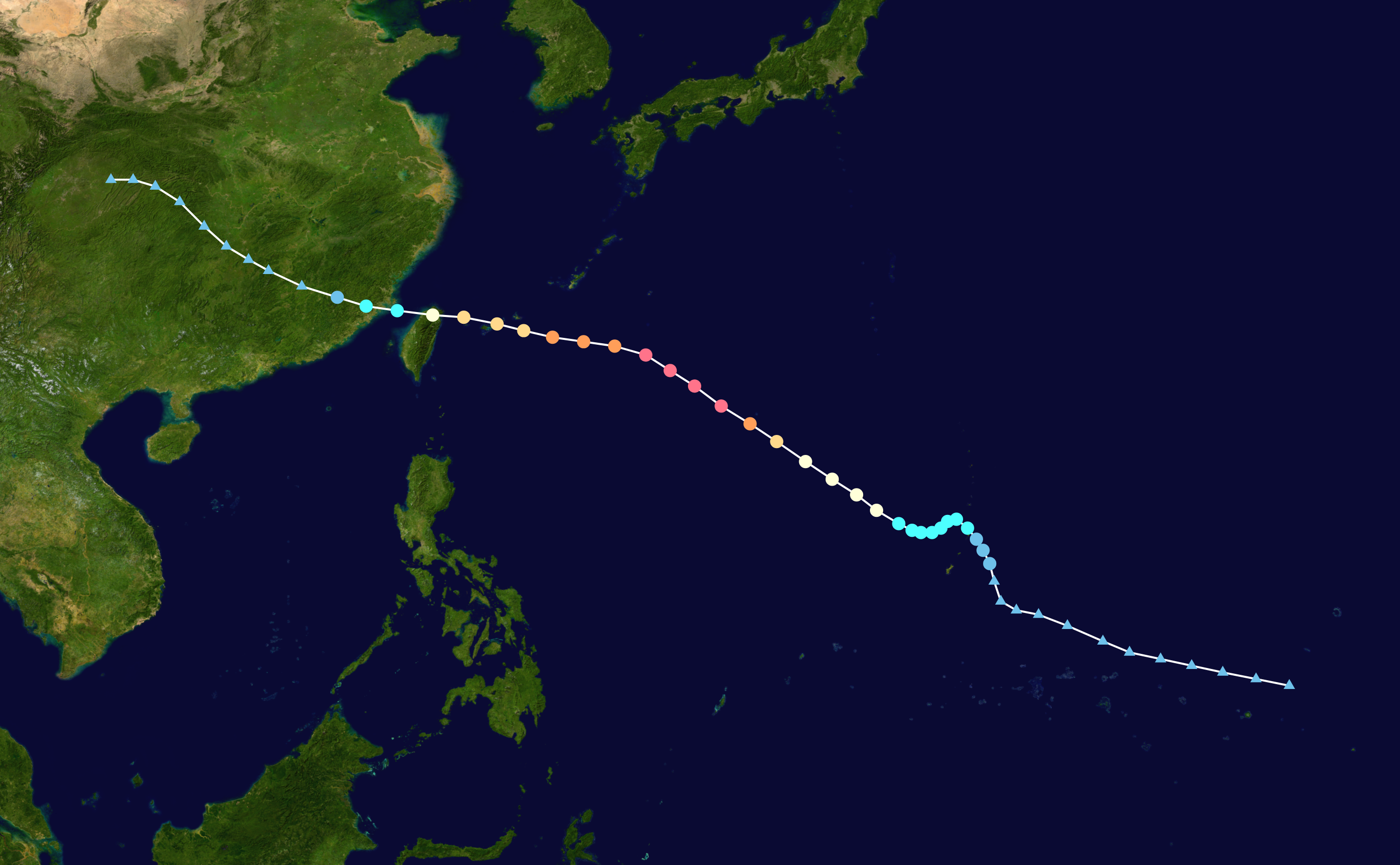
- Duration: July 31 – August 12
- Peak intensity: 230 km/h (145 mph) (1-min); 915 hPa (mbar)

When 105 mph (169 km/h) Typhoon Billie hit eastern Taiwan and China, it caused heavy flooding and wind damage, amounting to 4 casualties (with 8 missing and 41 drownings) and $2.6 million in damage (1976 USD).

=== Severe Tropical Storm Clara ===
- Severe tropical storm (JMA)
- Tropical storm (SSHWS)
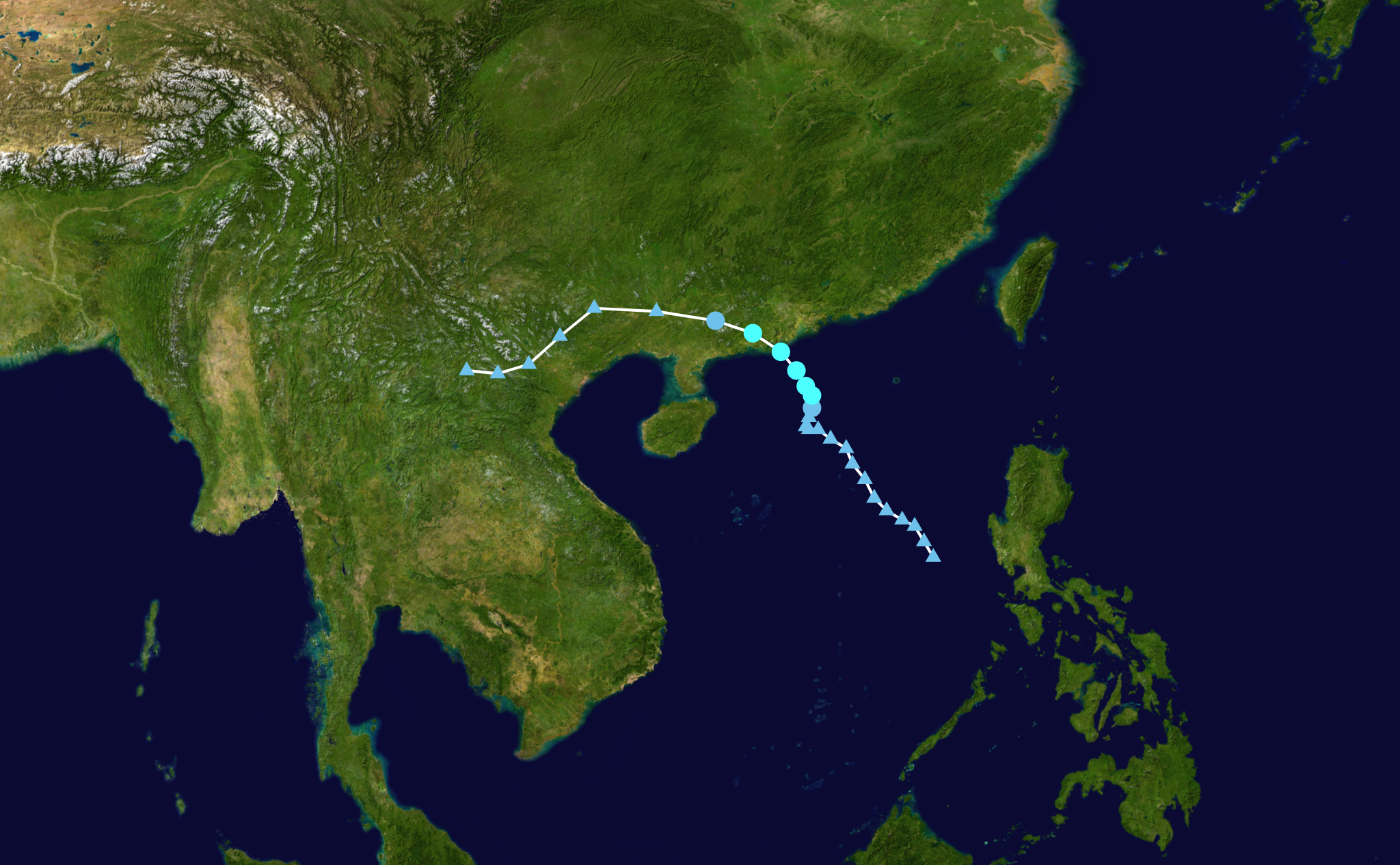
- Duration: August 2 – August 8
- Peak intensity: 75 km/h (45 mph) (1-min); 985 hPa (mbar)

Clara hit China.

=== Tropical Storm Dot (Osang) ===
- Tropical storm (JMA)
- Tropical storm (SSHWS)
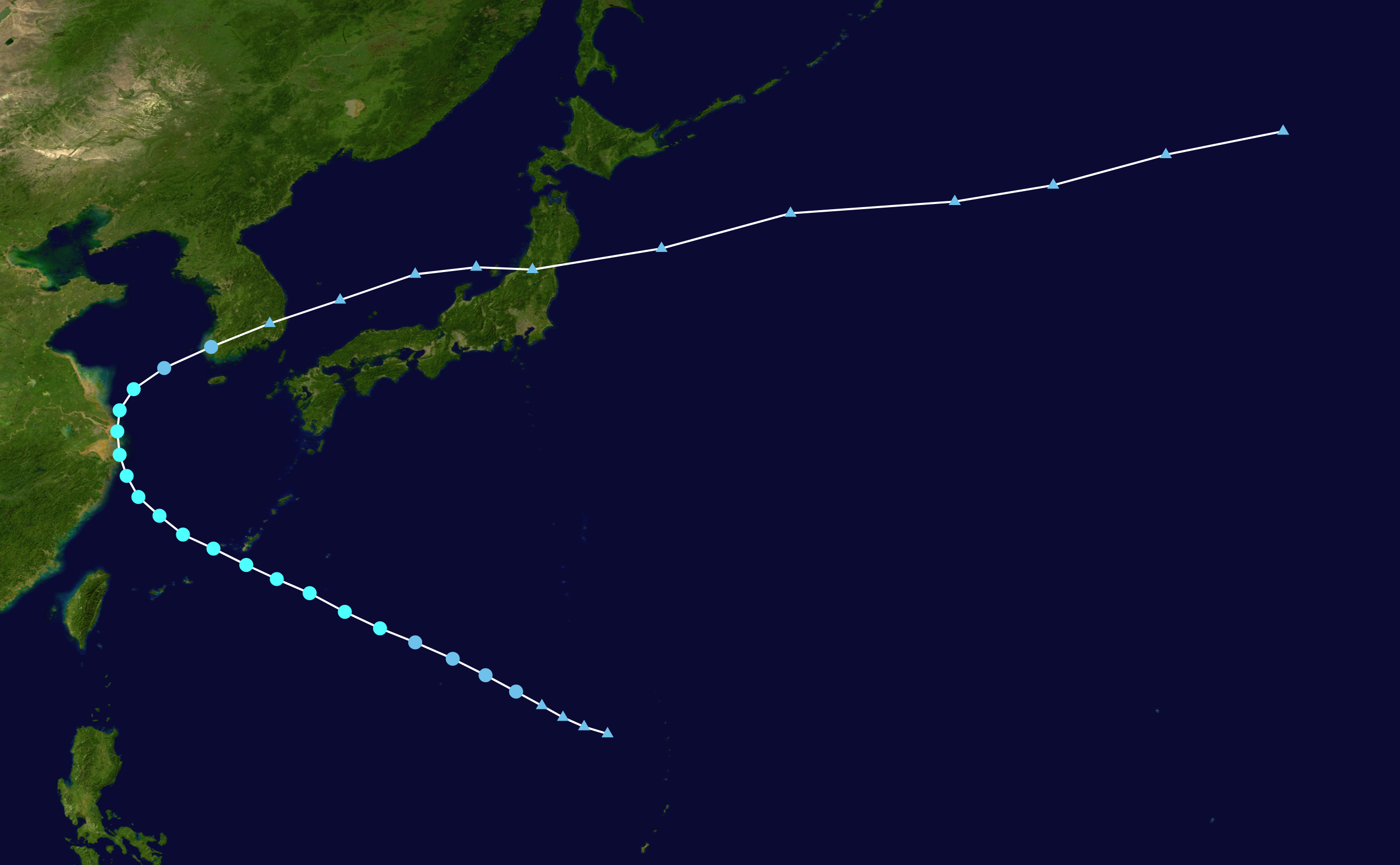
- Duration: August 17 – August 24
- Peak intensity: 95 km/h (60 mph) (1-min); 990 hPa (mbar)

Dot hit China and Japan.

=== Tropical Storm Ellen (Paring) ===
- Tropical storm (JMA)
- Tropical storm (SSHWS)
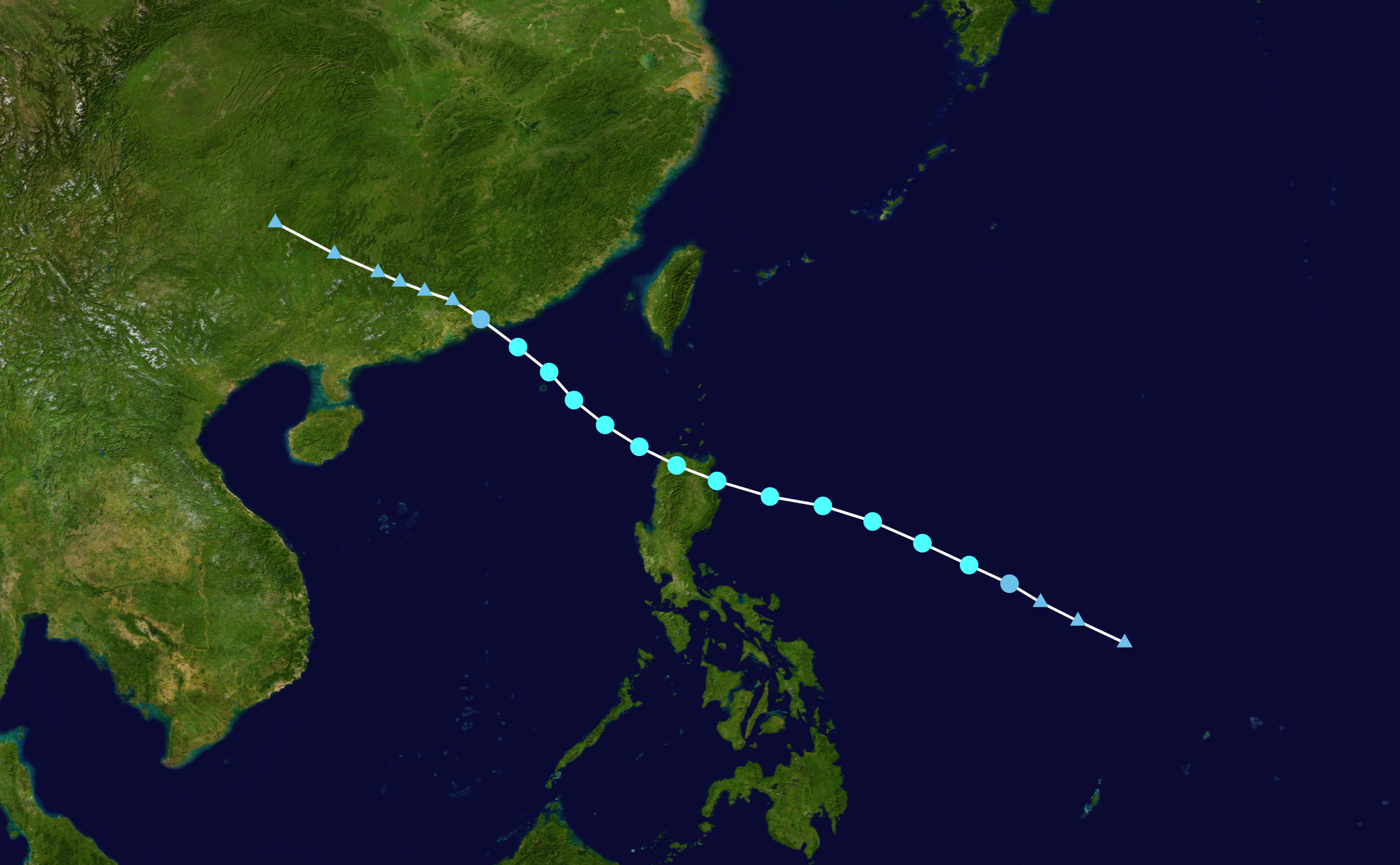
- Duration: August 20 – August 25
- Peak intensity: 85 km/h (50 mph) (1-min); 992 hPa (mbar)

Tropical Storm Ellen struck Hong Kong killing 27 people and left 3 missing. Eighteen people were killed in one landslip in Sau Mau Ping, Hong Kong.

=== Typhoon Fran (Reming) ===
- Typhoon (JMA)
- Category 4-equivalent typhoon (SSHWS)
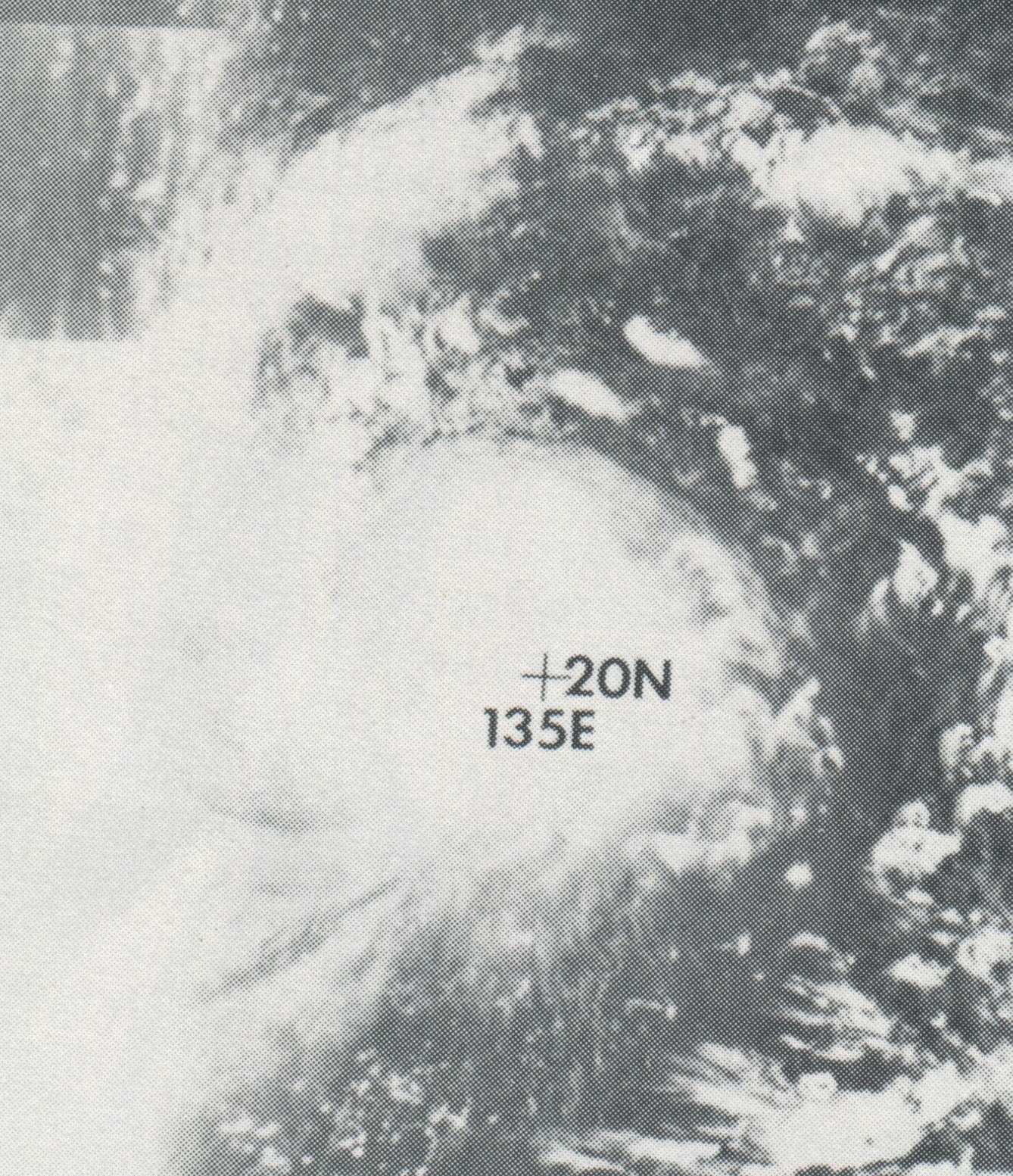
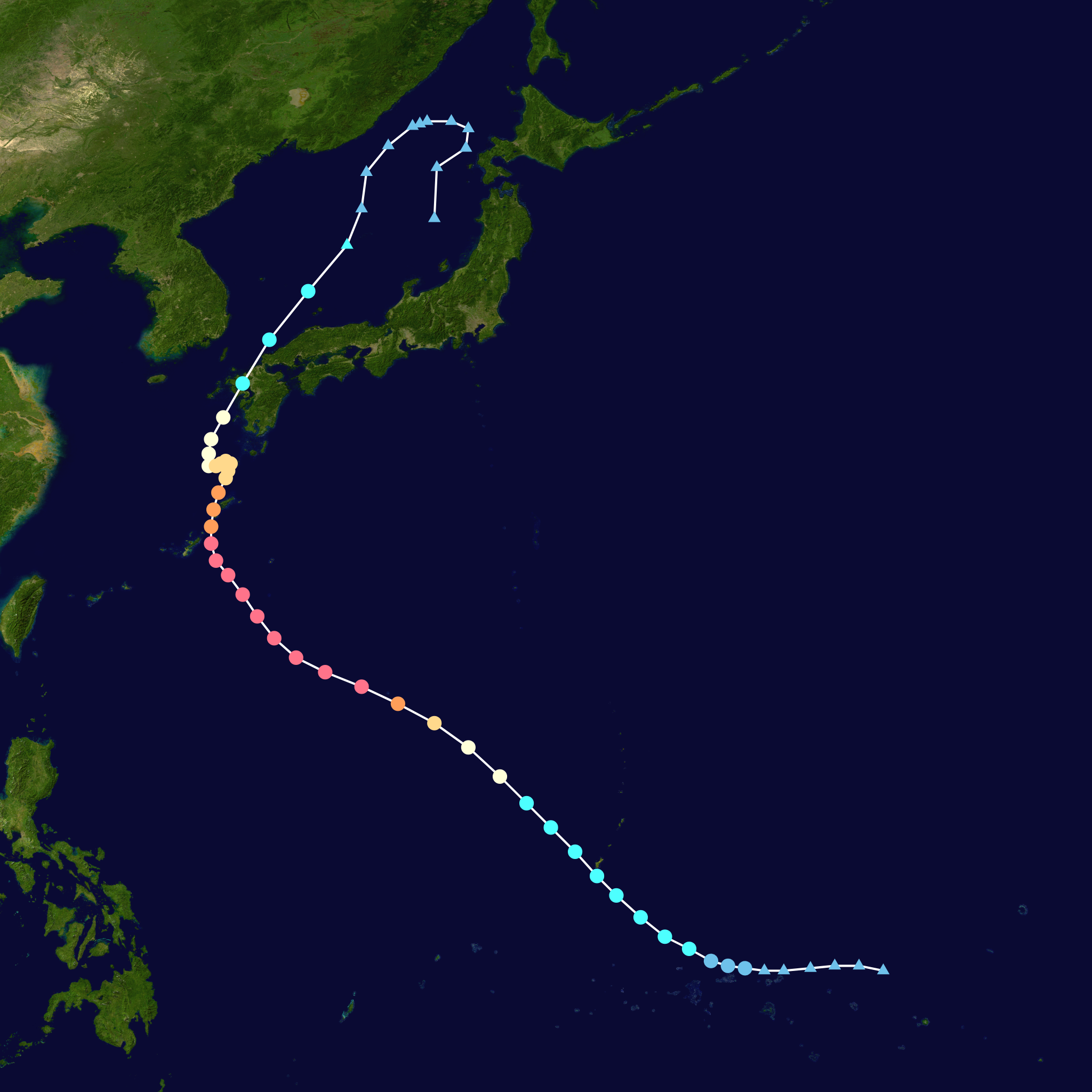
- Duration: September 2 – September 15
- Peak intensity: 240 km/h (150 mph) (1-min); 910 hPa (mbar)

An area of disturbed weather organized into Tropical Depression 17W on September 2. It tracked northwestward, becoming a tropical storm on the 4th and a typhoon on the 6th. Fran rapidly intensified to a 150 mph (240 km/h) super typhoon on the 7th, and weakened as it turned northward. After stalling and drifting to the west, Fran continued its northward movement, hit southwestern Japan on the 12th, and became extratropical in the Sea of Japan on the 13th. The storm caused heavy flooding and wind damage, causing 133 fatalities (with 32 missing) and $572 million in damage (1976 USD, $1.9 billion in 2005 USD), the worst Japanese typhoon in over 10 years.

=== Tropical Storm Georgia ===
- Tropical storm (JMA)
- Tropical storm (SSHWS)
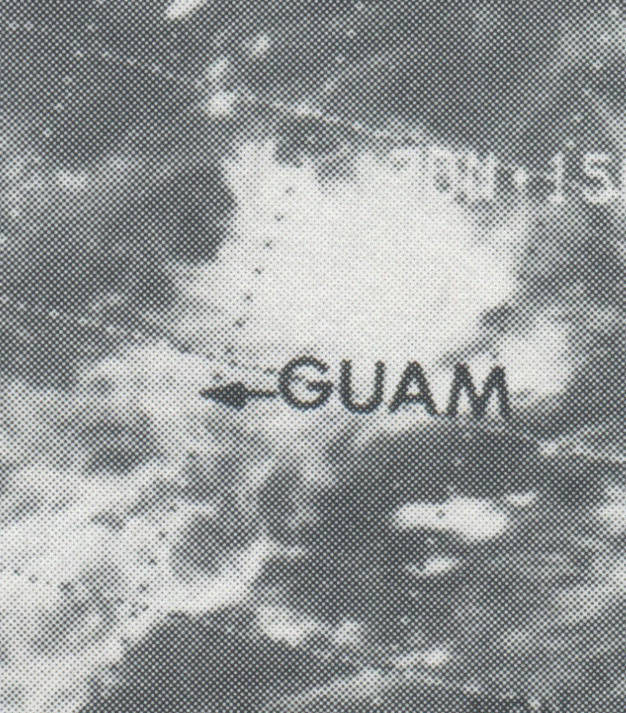
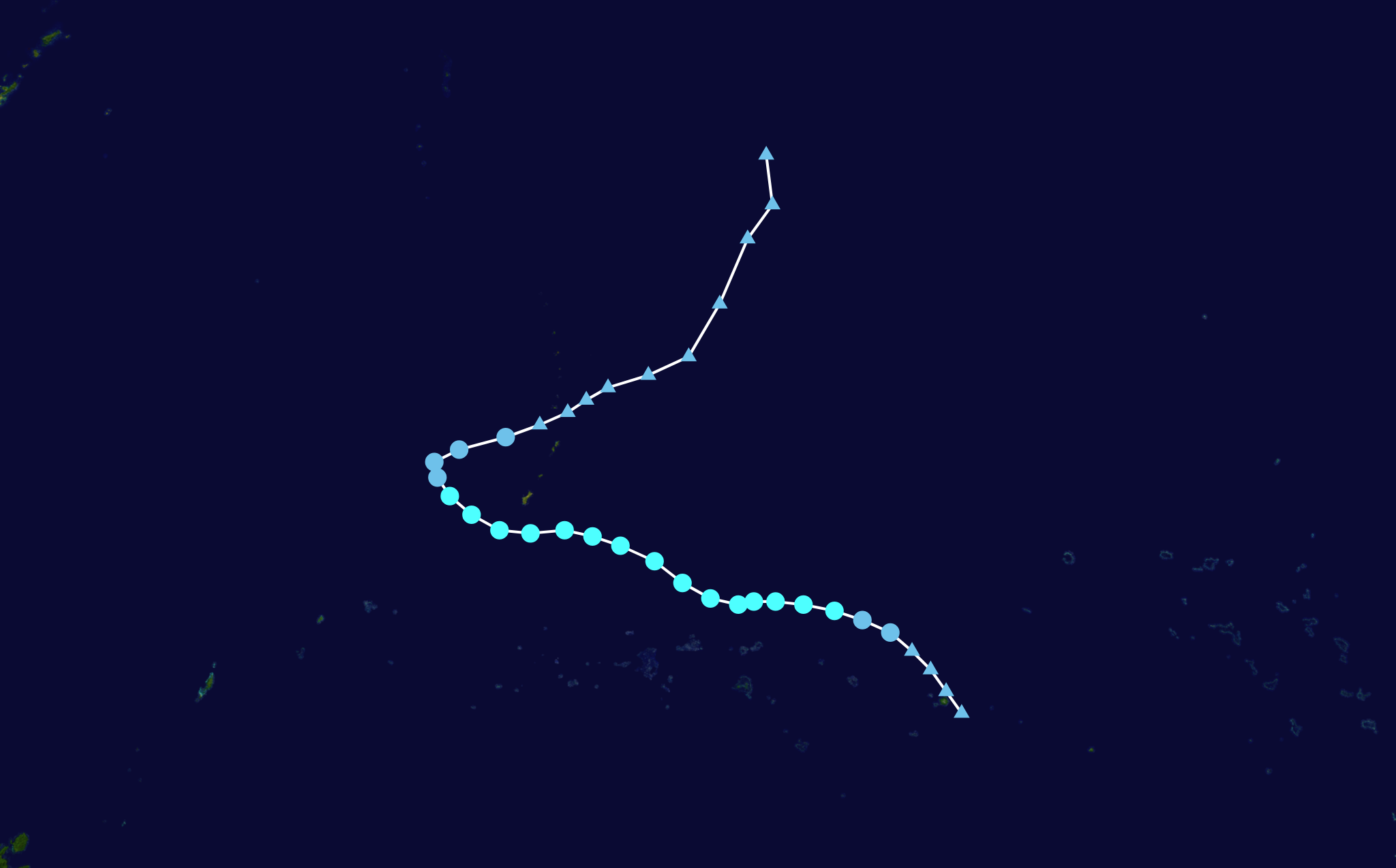
- Duration: September 8 – September 16
- Peak intensity: 75 km/h (45 mph) (1-min); 990 hPa (mbar)

Georgia moved north away from land.

=== Typhoon Hope ===
- Typhoon (JMA)
- Category 1-equivalent typhoon (SSHWS)
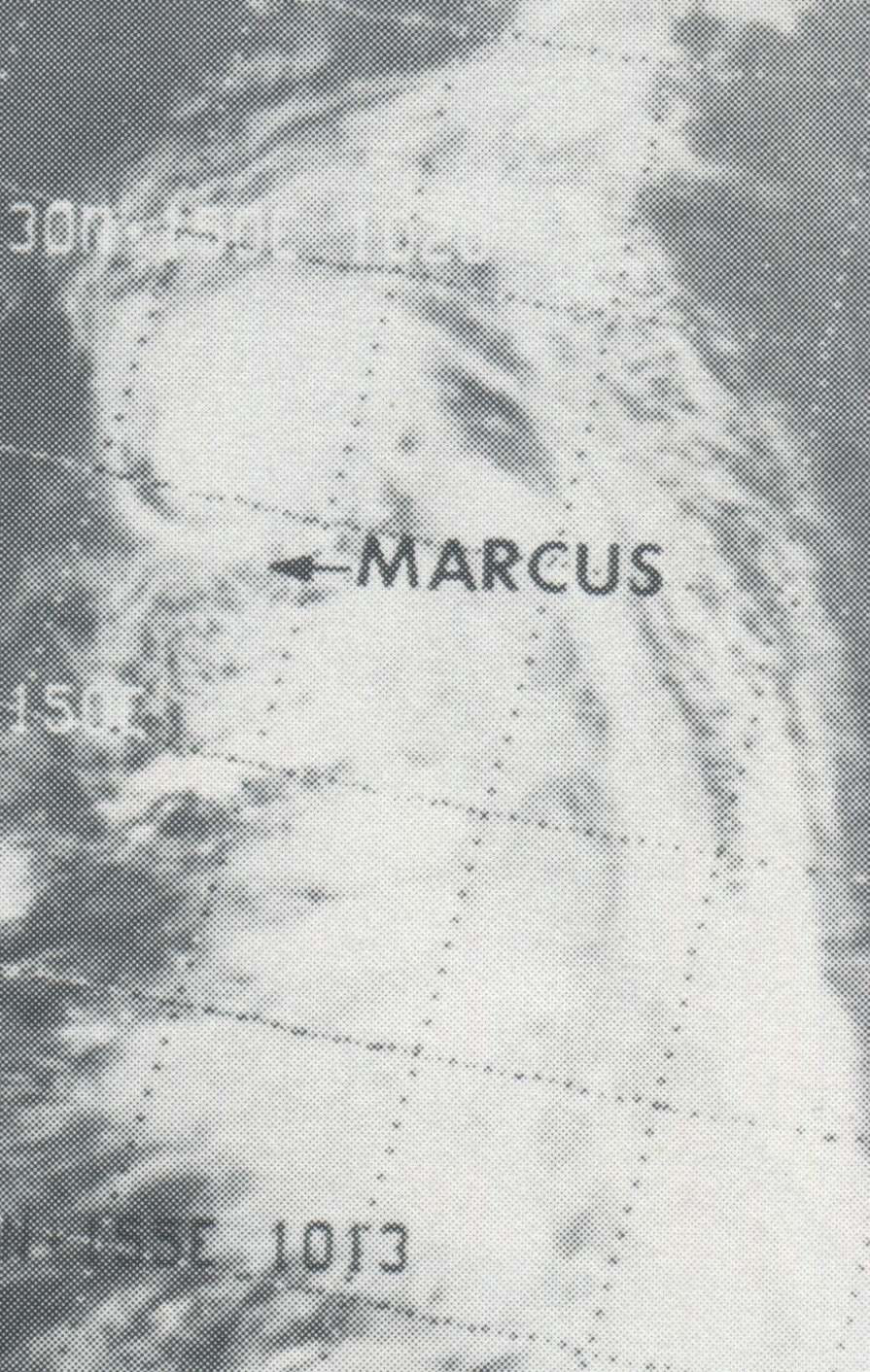
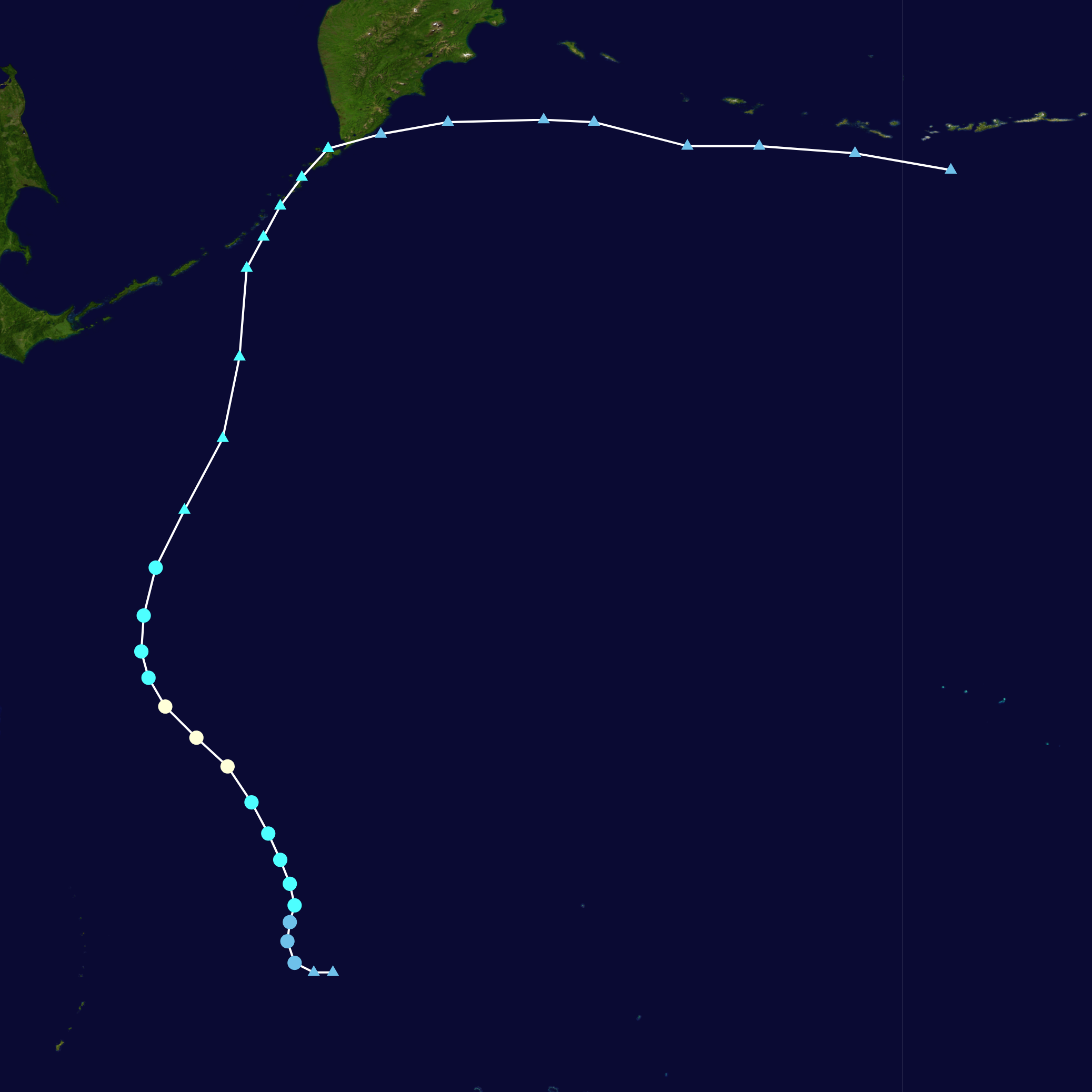
- Duration: September 13 – September 19
- Peak intensity: 130 km/h (80 mph) (1-min); 965 hPa (mbar)

Hope did not come near land.

=== Typhoon Iris (Toyang) ===
- Typhoon (JMA)
- Category 1-equivalent typhoon (SSHWS)
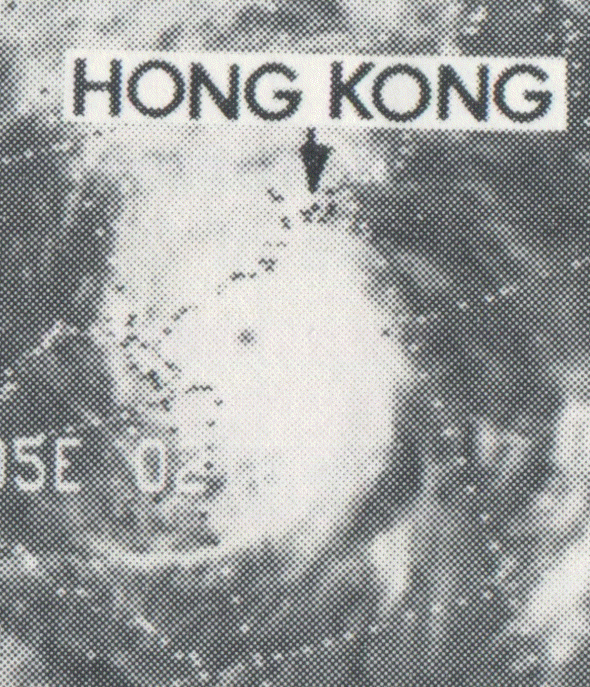
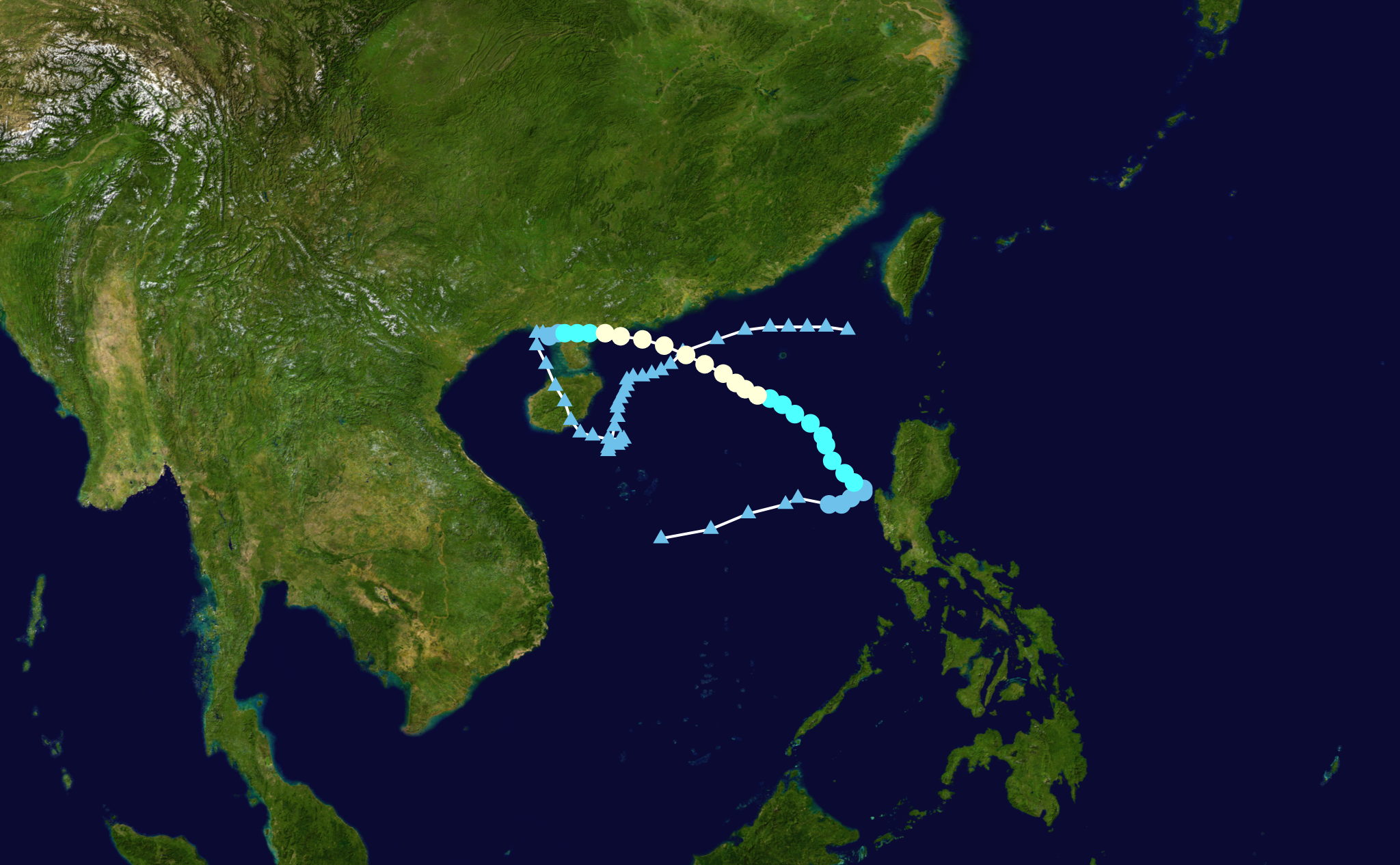
- Duration: September 14 – September 29
- Peak intensity: 140 km/h (85 mph) (1-min); 975 hPa (mbar)

Iris meandered over the South China Sea and struck South China.

=== Typhoon Joan ===
- Typhoon (JMA)
- Category 1-equivalent typhoon (SSHWS)
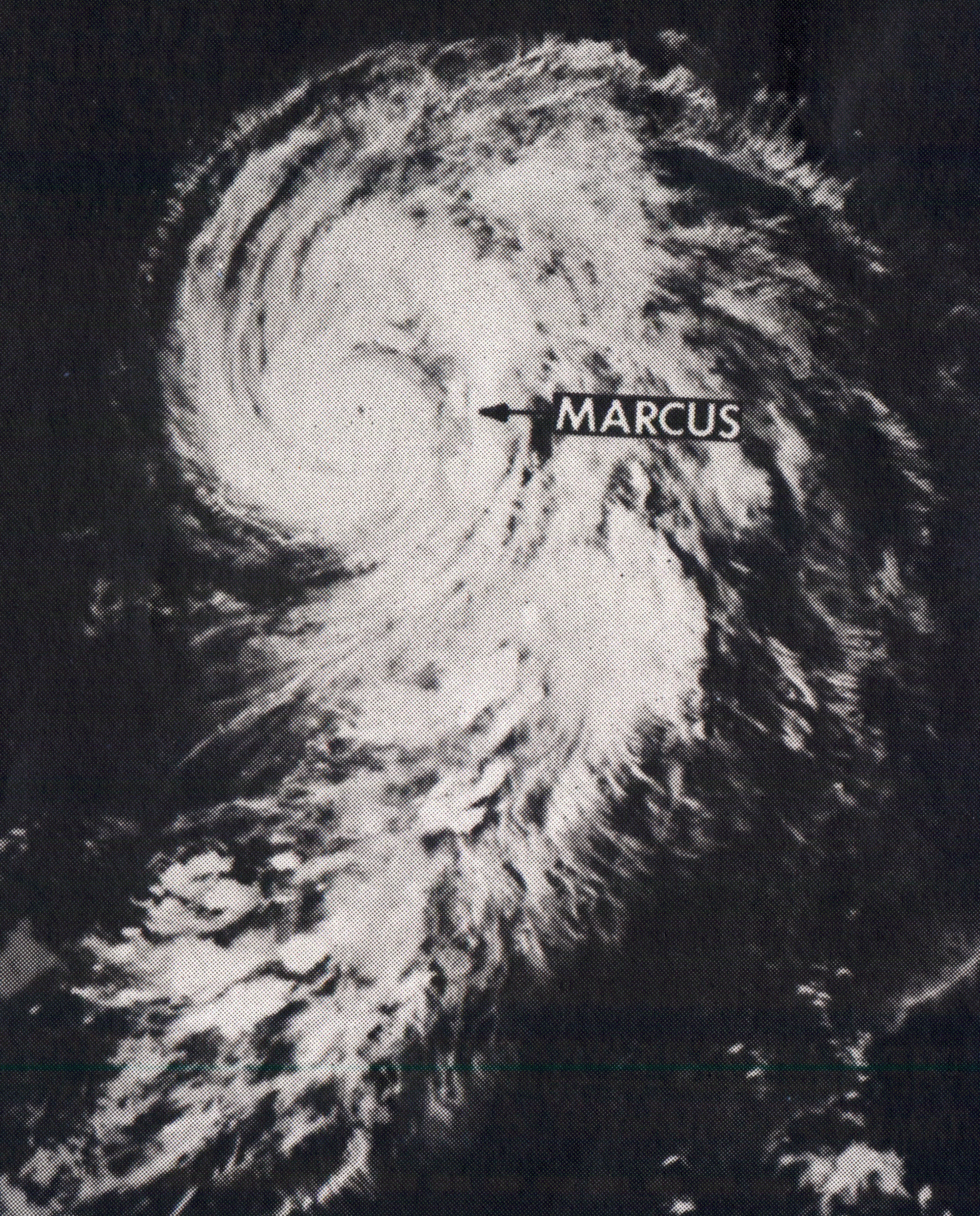
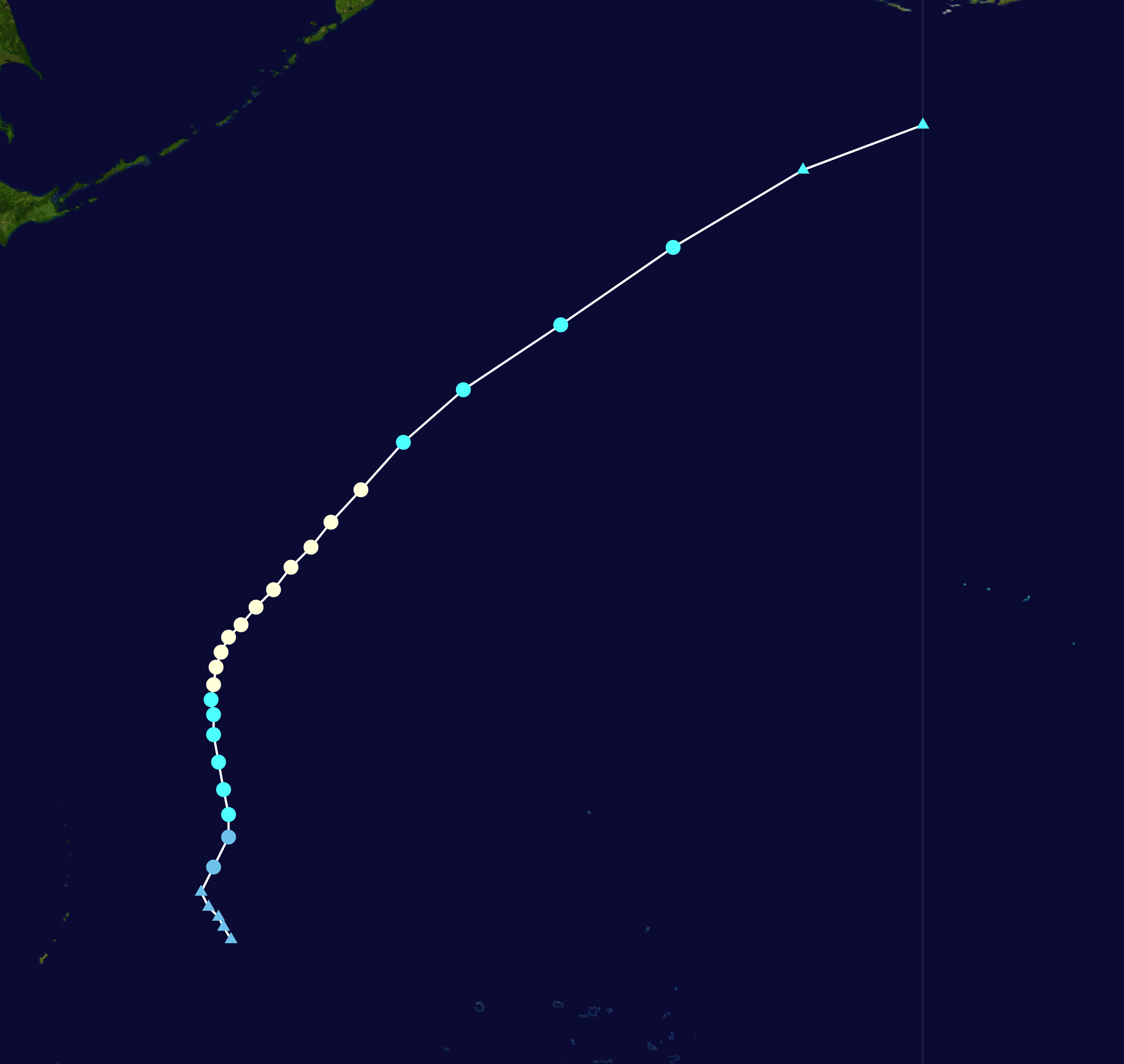
- Duration: September 18 – September 25
- Peak intensity: 130 km/h (80 mph) (1-min); 965 hPa (mbar)

Joan recurved east of Japan.

=== Typhoon Louise (Welpring) ===
- Typhoon (JMA)
- Category 5-equivalent super typhoon (SSHWS)
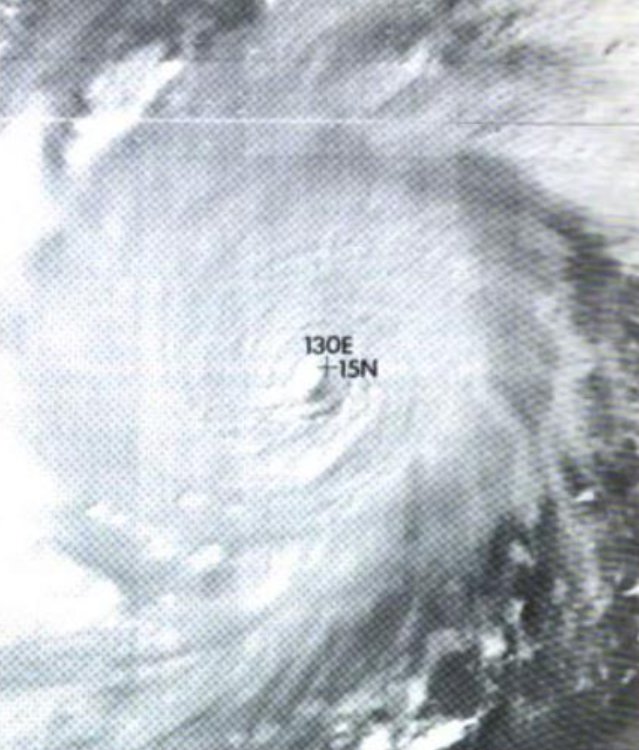
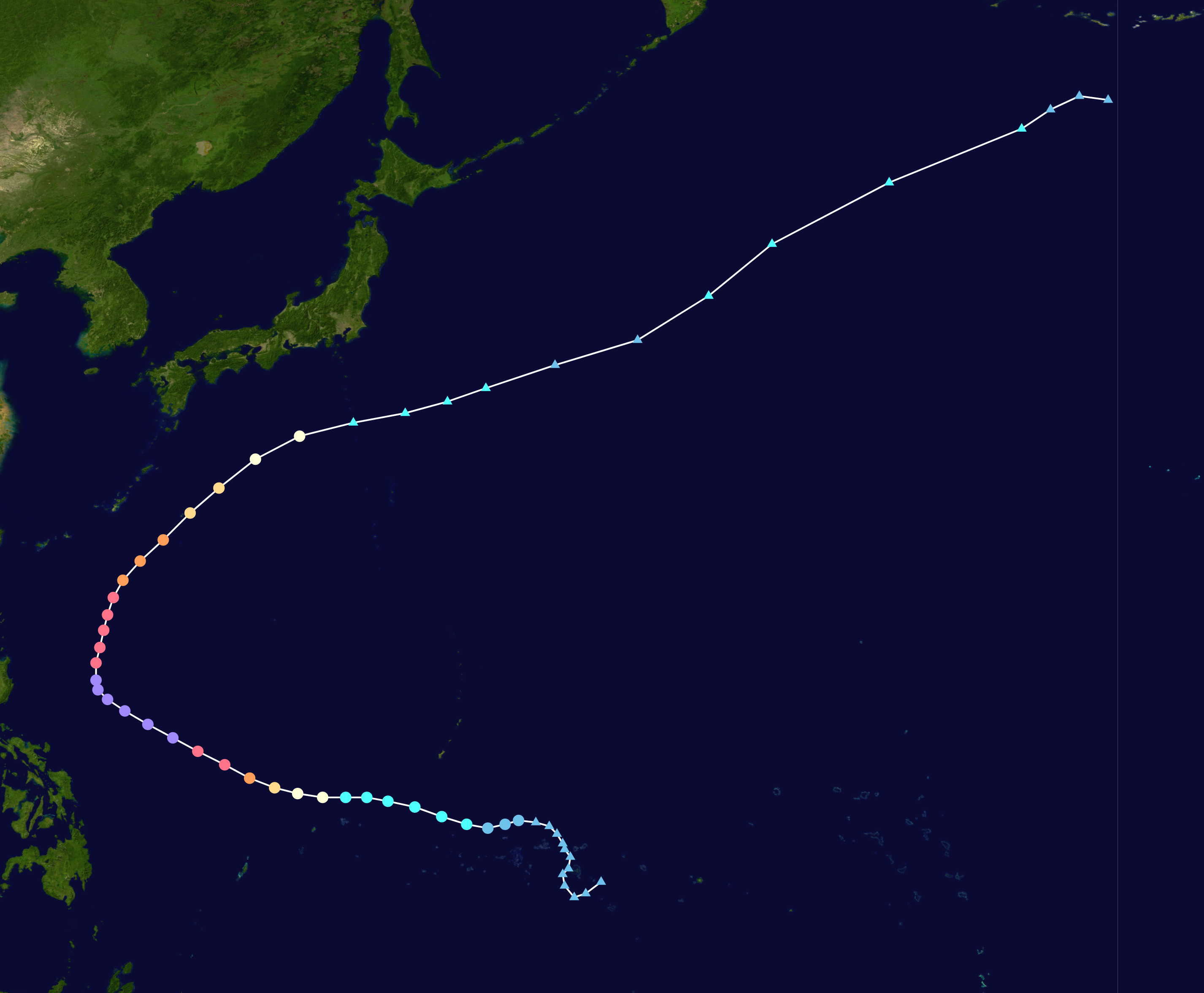
- Duration: October 27 – November 9
- Peak intensity: 260 km/h (160 mph) (1-min); 895 hPa (mbar)

Louise was the strongest typhoon of the season, becoming a Super Typhoon, bringing minor impacts to the Philippines and Japan.

=== Typhoon Marge (Yoning) ===
- Typhoon (JMA)
- Tropical storm (SSHWS)
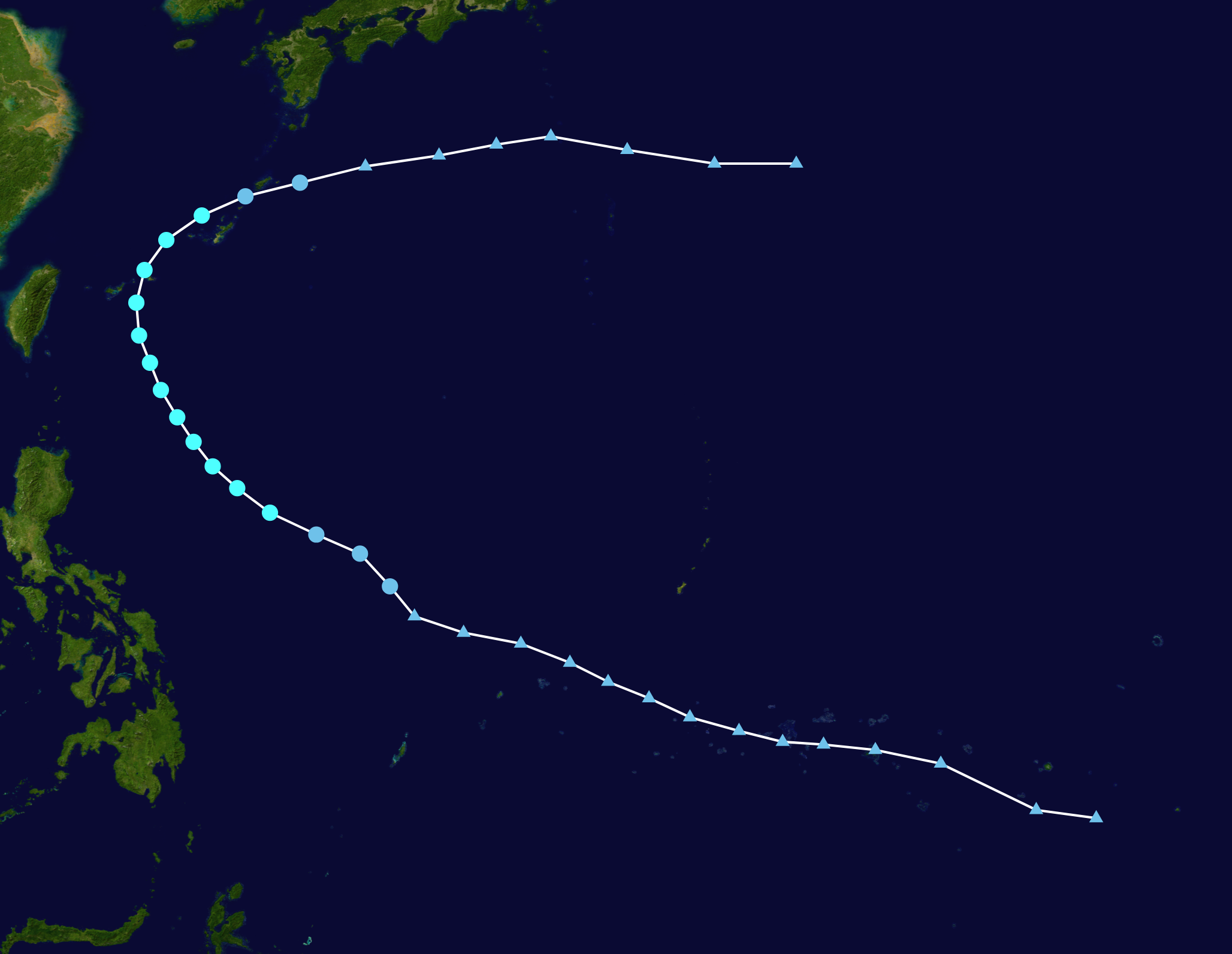
- Duration: November 4 – November 12
- Peak intensity: 110 km/h (70 mph) (1-min); 975 hPa (mbar)

Marge was a strong tropical storm.

=== Severe Tropical Storm Nora (Aring) ===
- Severe tropical storm (JMA)
- Tropical storm (SSHWS)
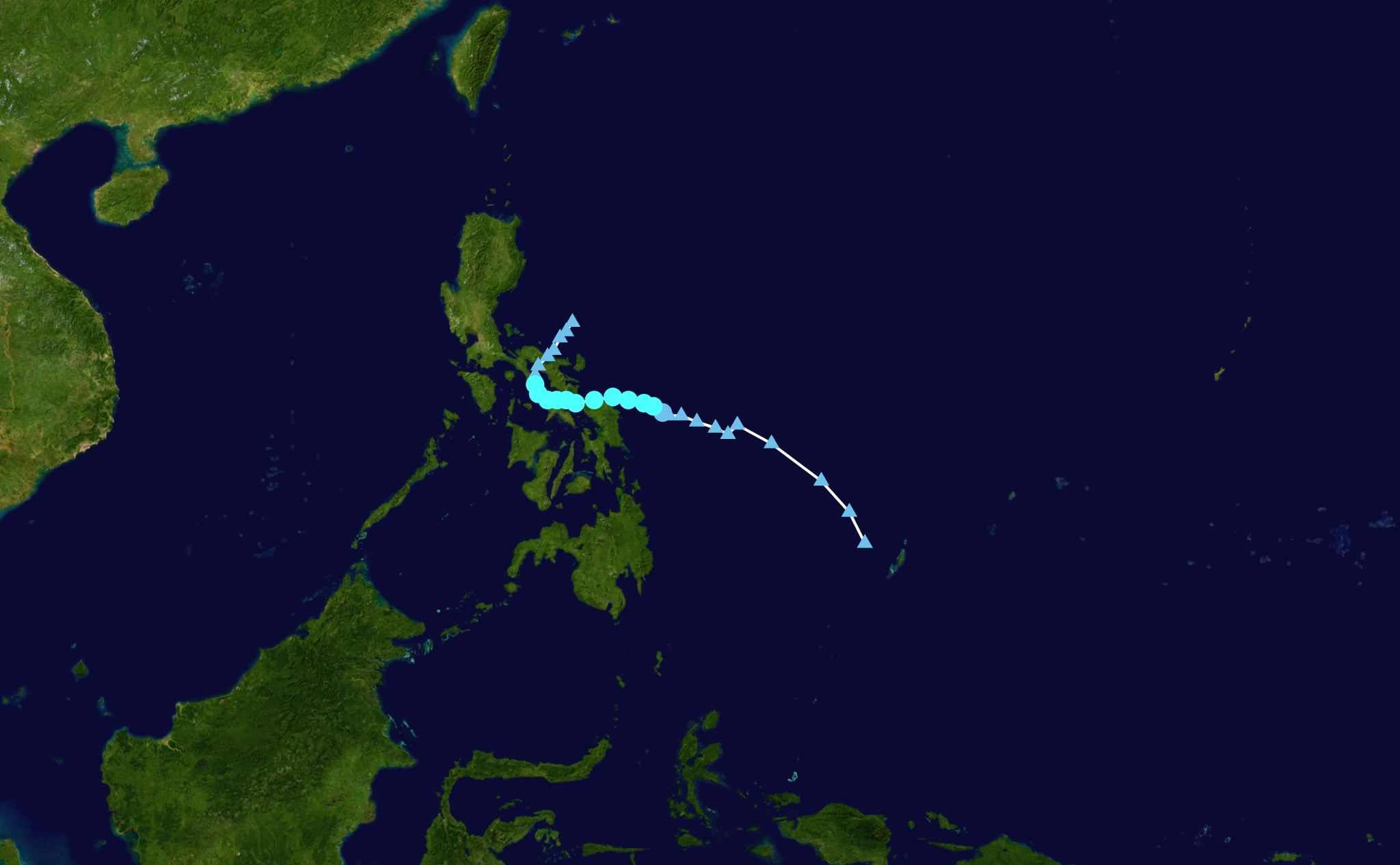
- Duration: December 1 – December 8
- Peak intensity: 85 km/h (50 mph) (1-min); 990 hPa (mbar)

Nora brushed the Philippines.

=== Tropical Storm Opal (Basiang) ===
- Tropical storm (JMA)
- Tropical storm (SSHWS)
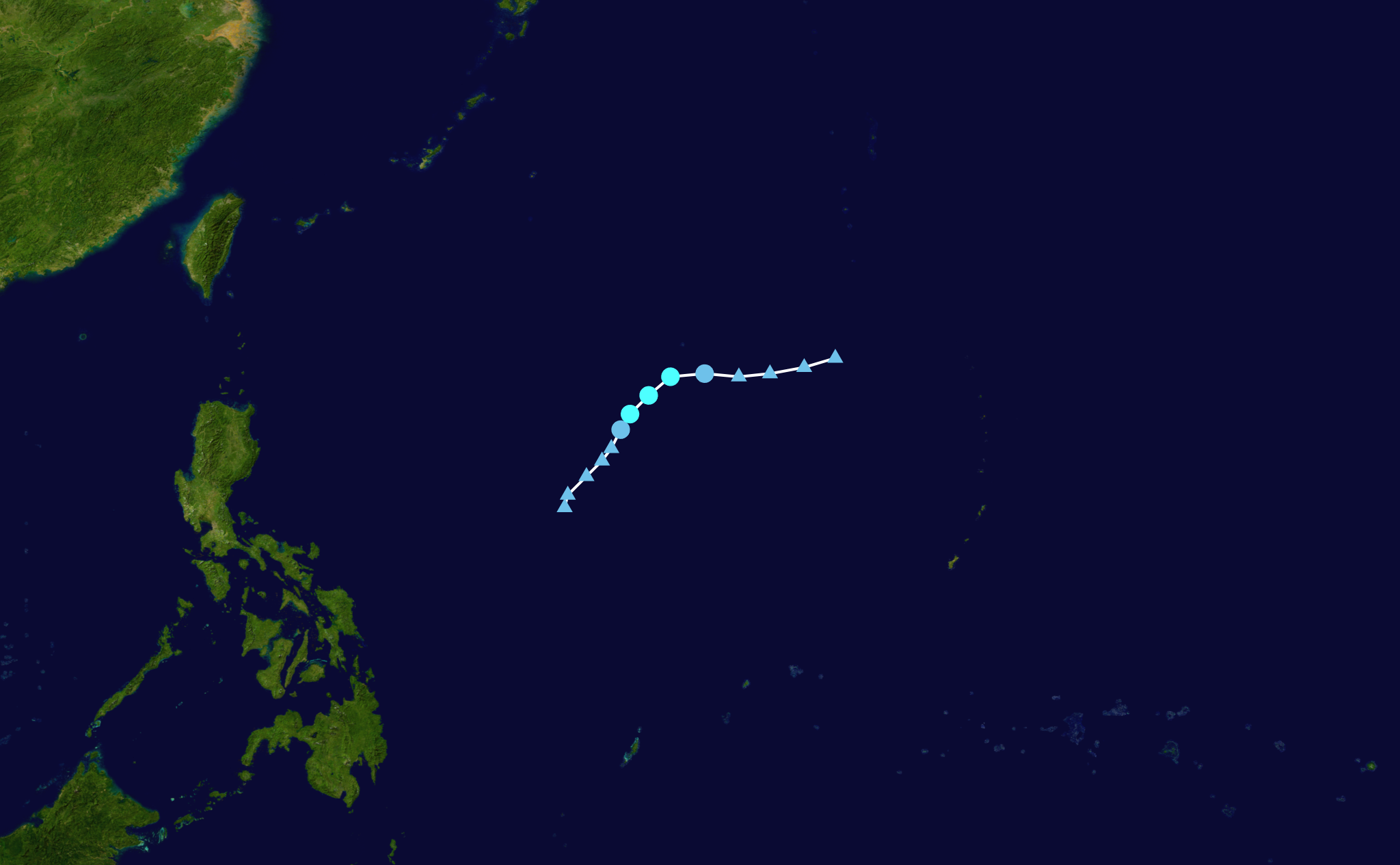
- Duration: December 8 – December 10
- Peak intensity: 65 km/h (40 mph) (1-min); 995 hPa (mbar)

Opal was a minimal tropical storm.

=== Other systems ===
- Tropical Depression Seniang formed on September 13, and was rather short-lived.
- A tropical depression formed within the Philippine Area of Responsibility on December 29, named Kayang by PAGASA. It dissipated the next day.

== Storm names ==
Western North Pacific tropical cyclones were named by the Joint Typhoon Warning Center. The first storm of 1976 was named Kathy and the final one was named Opal.

- Agnes
- Bonnie
- Carmen
- Della
- Elaine
- Faye
- Gloria
- Hester
- Irma
- Judy
- Kit
- Lola
- Mamie
- Nina
- Ora
- Phyllis
- Rita
- Susan
- Tess
- Viola
- Winnie
- Alice
- Betty
- Cora
- Doris
- Elsie
- Flossie
- Grace
- Helen
- Ida
- June
- Kathy 1W
- Lorna 2W
- Marie 3W
- Nancy 4W
- Olga 5W
- Pamela 6W
- Ruby 7W
- Sally 8W
- Therese 9W
- Violet 10W
- Wilda 11W
- Anita 12W
- Billie 13W
- Clara 14W
- Dot 15W
- Ellen 16W
- Fran 17W
- Georgia 18W
- Hope 19W
- Iris 20W
- Joan 21W
- Kate 22C
- Louise 23W
- Marge 24W
- Nora 25W
- Opal 26W
- Patsy
- Ruth
- Sarah
- Thelma
- Vera
- Wanda
- Amy
- Babe
- Carla
- Dinah
- Emma
- Freda
- Gilda
- Harriet
- Ivy
- Jean
- Kim
- Lucy
- Mary
- Nadine
- Olive
- Polly
- Rose
- Shirley
- Trix
- Virginia
- Wendy

One Central Pacific system developed, Hurricane Kate. The policy at the time was to use Western Pacific names the Central Pacific.

=== Philippines ===
Asiang	Biring	Konsing	Didang	Edeng
Gloring	Huaning	Isang	Lusing	Maring
Nitang	Osang	Paring	Reming	Seniang
Toyang	Unsang	Welpring	Yoning	
Auxiliary list
				Aring
Basiang	Kayang	Dorang (unused)	Enang (unused)	Grasing (unused)

The Philippine Atmospheric, Geophysical and Astronomical Services Administration uses its own naming scheme for tropical cyclones in their area of responsibility. PAGASA assigns names to tropical depressions that form within their area of responsibility and any tropical cyclone that might move into their area of responsibility. Should the list of names for a given year prove to be insufficient, names are taken from an auxiliary list, the first 6 of which are published each year before the season starts. Names not retired from this list will be used again in the 1980 season. This is the same list used for the 1972 season. PAGASA uses its own naming scheme that starts in the Filipino alphabet, with names of Filipino female names ending with "ng" (A, B, K, D, etc.). Names that were not assigned/going to use are marked in gray.

== Season effects ==
This table will list all the storms that developed in the northwestern Pacific Ocean west of the International Date Line and north of the equator during 1976. It will include their intensity, duration, name, areas affected, deaths, missing people (in parentheses), and damage totals. Classification and intensity values will be based on estimations conducted by the JMA, however due to lack of information around this time sustained winds were recorded by the JTWC. All damage figures will be in 1976 USD. Damages and deaths from a storm will include when the storm was a precursor wave or an extratropical low.

Name	Dates	Peak intensity			Areas affected	Damage (USD)	Deaths	Ref(s).
Name	Dates	Category	Wind speed	Pressure	Areas affected	Damage (USD)	Deaths	Ref(s).
Kathy	January 27 – February 2	Typhoon	155 km/h (95 mph)	965 hPa (28.50 inHg)	Caroline Islands	None	None	
Asiang	January 28 – February 1	Tropical depression	55 km/h (35 mph)	1006 hPa (29.71 inHg)	Philippines	None	None	
TD	February 1 – 5	Tropical depression	Not specified	1000 hPa (29.53 inHg)	Mariana Islands	None	None	
Biring	February 8 – 11	Tropical depression	55 km/h (35 mph)	1010 hPa (29.83 inHg)	Philippines	None	None	
Lorna	February 27 – March 1	Tropical storm	65 km/h (40 mph)	998 hPa (28.47 inHg)	Caroline Islands	None	None	
Marie (Konsing)	April 2 – 14	Typhoon	215 km/h (135 mph)	930 hPa (27.46 inHg)	Palau	None	None	
Nancy	April 25 – May 2	Severe tropical storm	100 km/h (60 mph)	985 hPa (29.09 inHg)	None	None	None	
Olga (Didang)	May 11 – 27	Typhoon	185 km/h (115 mph)	940 hPa (27.76 inHg)	Philippines, Ryukyu Islands	Unknown	374	
Pamela	May 14 – 27	Typhoon	240 km/h (150 mph)	920 hPa (27.17 inHg)	Caroline Islands, Mariana Islands	$500 million	11	
TD	May 14 – 15	Tropical depression	Not specified	1002 hPa (29.59 inHg)	Palau	None	None	
Gloring	June 14 – 21	Tropical depression	55 km/h (35 mph)	1002 hPa (29.59 inHg)	Philippines, Ryukyu Islands	None	None	
TD	June 16	Tropical depression	Not specified	1006 hPa (29.71 inHg)	None	None	None	
Ruby (Huaning)	June 21 – July 4	Typhoon	220 km/h (135 mph)	935 hPa (27.61 inHg)	Philippines, Taiwan, Ryukyu Islands	Unknown	16	
TD	June 21 – 22	Tropical depression	Not specified	1000 hPa (29.53 inHg)	South China	None	None	
Sally	June 23 – July 3	Typhoon	215 km/h (135 mph)	925 hPa (27.32 inHg)	Caroline Islands	None	None	
Therese	July 9 – 21	Typhoon	250 km/h (155 mph)	905 hPa (26.72 inHg)	Mariana Islands, Japan	Unknown	3	
TD	July 17 – 18	Tropical depression	Not specified	1004 hPa (29.65 inHg)	Caroline Islands	None	None	
TD	July 18 – 21	Tropical depression	Not specified	1004 hPa (29.65 inHg)	None	None	None	
Violet (Lusing)	July 19 – 27	Severe tropical storm	100 km/h (60 mph)	985 hPa (29.09 inHg)	South China	None	0 2	
Wilda	July 21 – 24	Severe tropical storm	85 km/h (55 mph)	985 hPa (29.09 inHg)	Japan	None	None	
Anita (Maring)	July 21 – 27	Typhoon	120 km/h (75 mph)	980 hPa (28.94 inHg)	Japan	Unknown	None	
TD	July 24	Tropical depression	Not specified	1004 hPa (29.65 inHg)	None	None	None	
TD	July 26 – 27	Tropical depression	Not specified	1002 hPa (29.59 inHg)	None	None	None	
TD	July 30 – August 2	Tropical depression	Not specified	1002 hPa (29.59 inHg)	Ryukyu Islands	None	None	
TD	July 30 – August 1	Tropical depression	Not specified	1002 hPa (29.59 inHg)	Ryukyu Islands, Taiwan	None	None	
Billie (Nitang)	August 1 – 12	Typhoon	120 km/h (75 mph)	980 hPa (28.94 inHg)	Taiwan, Ryukyu Islands, East China	$2.6 million	48	
TD	August 1 – 2	Tropical depression	Not specified	1006 hPa (29.71 inHg)	None	None	None	
Clara	August 2 – 7	Severe tropical storm	75 km/h (45 mph)	985 hPa (29.09 inHg)	South China	Unknown	Unknown	
TD	August 2 – 3	Tropical depression	Not specified	1002 hPa (29.59 inHg)	South China	None	None	
Dot (Oyang)	August 17 – 23	Tropical storm	95 km/h (60 mph)	990 hPa (29.23 inHg)	Japan, East China, South Korea	None	None	
Ellen (Paring)	August 20 – 25	Tropical storm	85 km/h (55 mph)	992 hPa (28.29 inHg)	Philippines, South China	Unknown	27	
TD	August 31 – September 2	Tropical depression	Not specified	1012 hPa (29.89 inHg)	None	None	None	
Fran	September 3 – 14	Typhoon	240 km/h (150 mph)	910 hPa (26.87 inHg)	Mariana Islands, Japan	$660 million	169	
Georgia	September 8 – 16	Tropical storm	75 km/h (45 mph)	990 hPa (29.23 inHg)	Caroline Islands	None	None	
TD	September 9	Tropical depression	Not specified	1006 hPa (29.71 inHg)	None	None	None	
Iris (Toyang)	September 13 – October 1	Typhoon	140 km/h (85 mph)	975 hPa (28.79 inHg)	Philippines, South China	Unknown	Unknown	
Hope	September 13 – 18	Typhoon	130 km/h (80 mph)	965 hPa (28.50 inHg)	None	None	None	
Seniang	September 13 – 14	Tropical depression	45 km/h (30 mph)	1004 hPa (29.65 inHg)	None	None	None	
TD	September 17 – 18	Tropical depression	Not specified	1004 hPa (29.65 inHg)	Mariana Islands	None	None	
Joan	September 18 – 24	Typhoon	130 km/h (80 mph)	965 hPa (28.50 inHg)	None	None	None	
TD	September 19	Tropical depression	Not specified	1006 hPa (29.71 inHg)	None	None	None	
TD	September 26	Tropical depression	Not specified	1008 hPa (29.77 inHg)	Ryukyu Islands	None	None	
TD	September 29 – October 1	Tropical depression	Not specified	1000 hPa (29.53 inHg)	None	None	None	
Undang	September 29 – October 2	Tropical depression	45 km/h (30 mph)	1002 hPa (29.53 inHg)	Ryukyu Islands	None	None	
Louise (Welpring)	October 28 – November 8	Typhoon	260 km/h (160 mph)	895 hPa (26.43 inHg)	Caroline Islands, Philippines	None	None	
Marge (Yoning)	November 4 – 11	Typhoon	110 km/h (70 mph)	975 hPa (28.79 inHg)	Caroline Islands, Ryukyu Islands	None	None	
TD	November 21	Tropical depression	Not specified	1006 hPa (29.71 inHg)	Caroline Islands	None	None	
TD	November 28 − 30	Tropical depression	Not specified	1006 hPa (29.71 inHg)	Philippines	None	None	
Nora (Aring)	December 2 – 7	Severe tropical storm	85 km/h (55 mph)	990 hPa (29.23 inHg)	Philippines	Unknown	Unknown	
Opal (Barang)	December 7 – 10	Tropical storm	65 km/h (40 mph)	996 hPa (29.41 inHg)	Caroline Islands	None	None	
Kayang	December 28 – 30	Tropical depression	45 km/h (30 mph)	1004 hPa (29.65 inHg)	Philippines	Unknown	Unknown	
Season aggregates
51 systems	January 27 – December 30, 1976		260 km/h (160 mph)	895 hPa (26.43 inHg)		>$1.16 billion	>650	

== See also ==
- Pacific typhoon season
- 1976 Pacific hurricane season
- 1976 Atlantic hurricane season
- 1976 North Indian Ocean cyclone season
- Australian region cyclone seasons: 1975–76 1976–77
- South Pacific cyclone seasons: 1975–76 1976–77
- South-West Indian Ocean cyclone seasons: 1975–76 1976–77
