= Anett =

- Gender: Female

Anett is a feminine given name. People bearing the name include:

- Anett Györe (born 1981), Hungarian water polo player
- Anett Kisfaludy (born 1990), Hungarian handball player
- Anett Kontaveit (born 1995), Estonian tennis player
- Anett Pötzsch (born 1960), German figure skater
- Anett Schuck (born 1970), German sprint canoer
- Anett Sopronyi (born 1986), Hungarian handball player
- Anett Vilipuu (born 1996), Estonian footballer
- Hege Anett Pettersson (born 1973), Norwegian handball player
- Marie-Anett Mey (born 1971), French musician

== See also ==
- Anet (disambiguation)
- Aneta (given name)
- Anete
- Annett (disambiguation)
- Annette (disambiguation)
- Storm Anett, Europe, September 2024
