= Anete =

Anete is a feminine given name, a variant spelling of Annette and may refer to:

- Añete (born 1985), Spanish footballer
- Anete Brice (born 1991), Latvian cross country skier
- Anete Jēkabsone-Žogota (born 1983), Latvian basketball player
- Anete Kociņa (born 1995), Latvian javelin thrower
- Anete Lāce (born 2003), Latvian figure skater
- Anete Muižniece-Brice (born 1962), Latvian basketball player
- Anete Paulus (born 1991), Estonian footballer
- Anete Salinieka (born 1990), Latvian make-up artist
- Anete Šteinberga (born 1990), Latvian basketball player

== See also ==
- Anett
- Annette
