= Muižnieks =

Origin
- Origin: Latvian
- Meaning: "landlord"

Muižnieks (Old orthography: Muischneek; feminine: Muižniece) is a Latvian language occupational surname. Individuals with the surname include:

- Valdis Muižnieks (1935–2013), Latvian basketball player
- Nils Muižnieks (1964), Latvian-American human rights activist and political scientist
- Kārlis Muižnieks (1964), former basketball player
- Vineta Muižniece (1956), Latvian jurist and politician
- Anete Muižniece-Brice (1962), Latvian former basketball player
