= Aneta =

Aneta may refer to:

- Aneta (given name)
- Aneta, North Dakota, US
- Aneta (album), by Irini Merkouri
- Aneta (news agency), the first news agency operating in the Dutch East Indies
- Persbiro Indonesia Aneta, successor to the Aneta news agency
