= Anet (disambiguation) =

Anet is a commune in France.

Anet, or ANET, may also refer to:

- A-Net, an audio network technology by Aviom
- Canadian-born singer/songwriter Annette Ducharme
- Game developer ArenaNet (commonly shortened to ANet)
- Airliners.net, aviation website and discussion forum
- Air Nippon Network (commonly shortened to A-net)
- Ancient Near Eastern Texts Relating to the Old Testament (ANET)
- The Ancient Near East Today, online publication of the American Society of Overseas Research (ASOR)
- Arista Networks on the New York Stock Exchange (ticker symbol ANET)

== People with the surname ==
- Bobby Anet, American basketball player
- Jean-Baptiste Anet (1676–1755), French violinist

== See also ==
- Ant (name)
- Anett, a feminine given name
- Annette (disambiguation)
