= List of storms named Annette =

The name Annette has been used for four tropical cyclones in the Eastern Pacific Ocean, and one in the Southwest Pacific.

Eastern Pacific Ocean:

- Tropical Storm Annette (1960), paralleled close to the Mexican coastline, but did not strike land
- Tropical Storm Annette (1968), struck Mexico
- Hurricane Annette (1972), Category 1 hurricane that struck Mexico as a tropical depression
- Hurricane Annette (1976), powerful Category 4 hurricane that paralleled the Mexican coast

Southwest Pacific Ocean:

- Tropical Cyclone Annette (1994), landfall at Mandora Station; considerable damage to homes and crops and about 1,000 cattle were lost in the storm
