= 1975–76 South Pacific cyclone season =

Tropical cyclone season

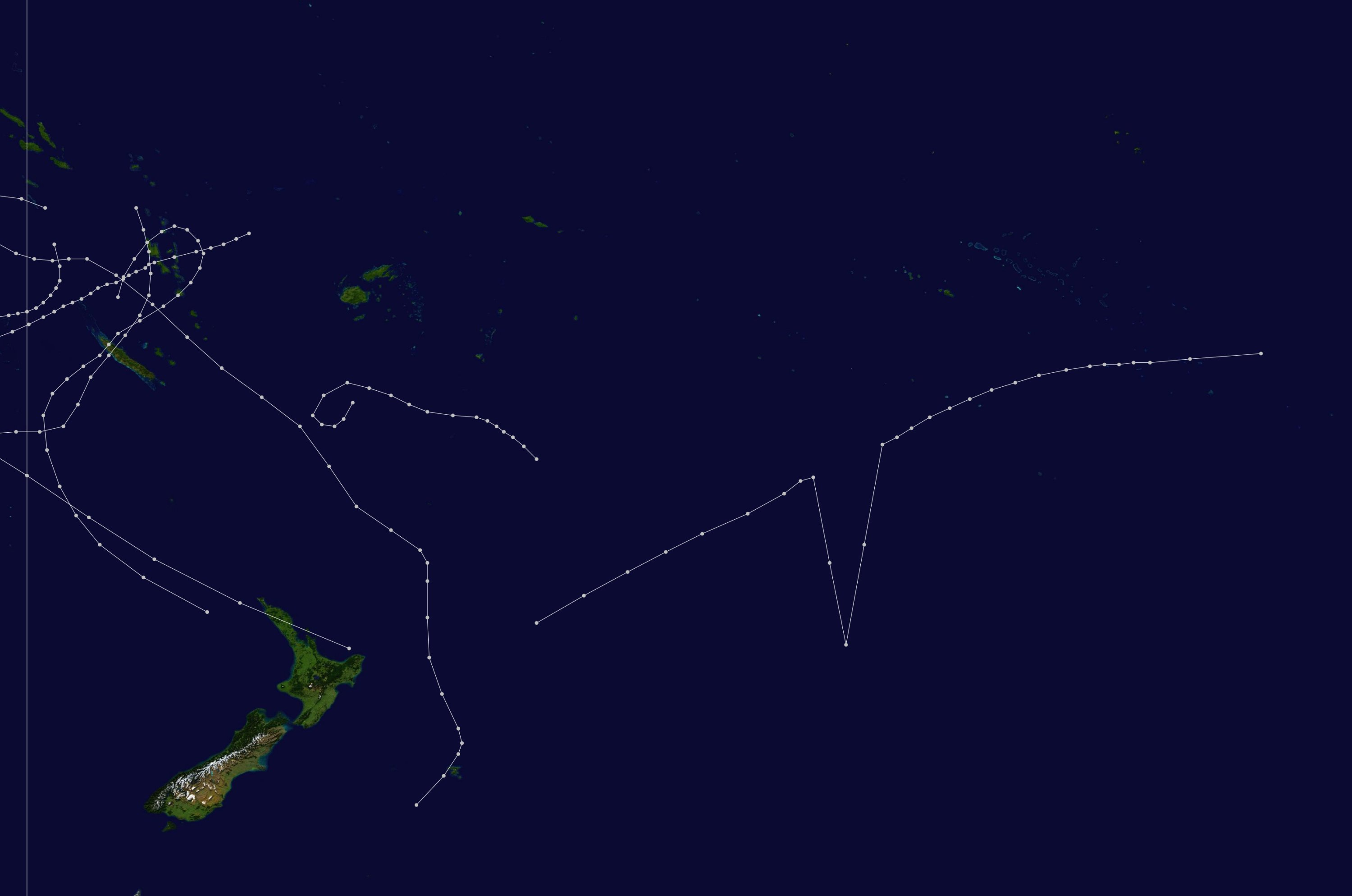
- Season summary map

Seasonal boundaries
- First system formed: July 31, 1975
- Last system dissipated: April 30, 1976

Strongest storm
- Name: David
  - Maximum winds: 155 km/h (100 mph) (11-minute sustained)
  - Lowest pressure: 945 hPa (mbar)

Seasonal statistics
- Total disturbances: 6
- Tropical cyclones: 6
- Severe tropical cyclones: 3
- Total fatalities: Unknown
- Total damage: Unknown

Related articles
- 1975–76 South-West Indian Ocean cyclone season; 1975–76 Australian region cyclone season

The 1975–76 South Pacific cyclone season was the first South Pacific cyclone season to include male names.

== Systems ==
=== Tropical Storm 01P ===
- Tropical storm (SSHWS)
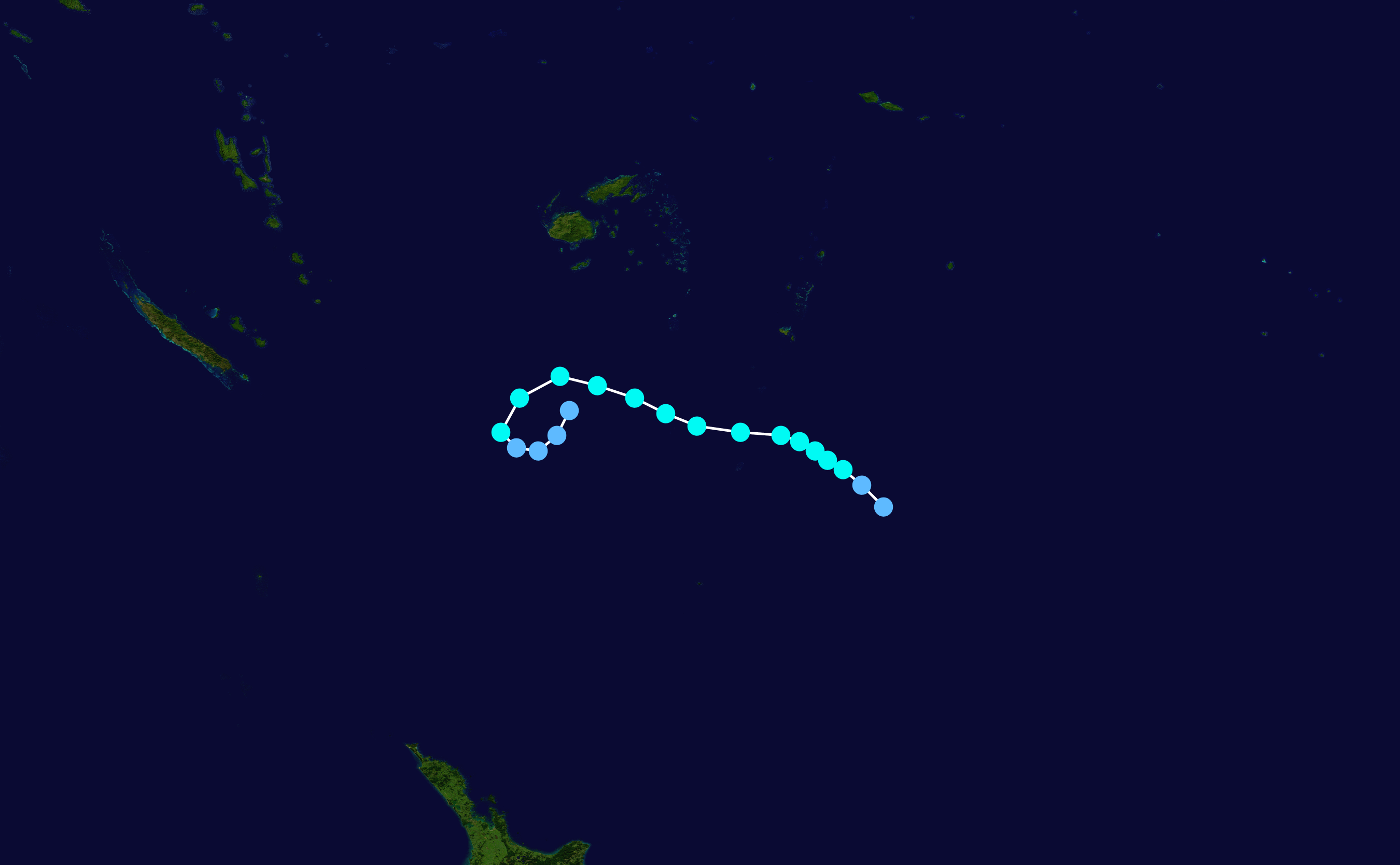
- Duration: July 31 – August 4
- Peak intensity: 85 km/h (50 mph) (1-min);

=== Tropical Depression Charlotte ===
- Tropical depression (SSHWS)
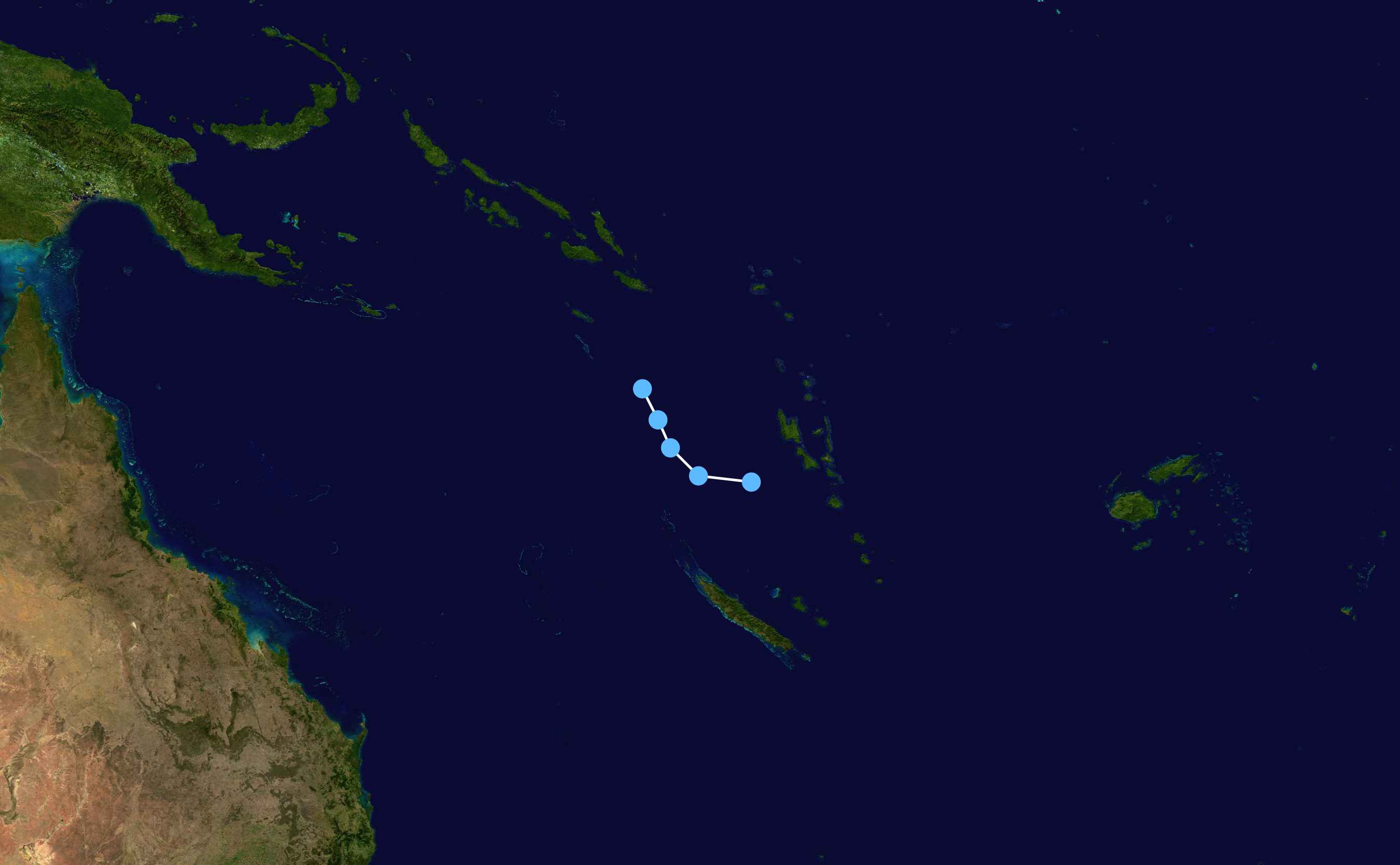
- Duration: November 18 – November 19
- Peak intensity: 30 km/h (15 mph) (1-min); 1007 hPa (mbar)

=== Severe Tropical Cyclone David ===
- Category 3 severe tropical cyclone (Australian scale)
- Category 3 tropical cyclone (SSHWS)
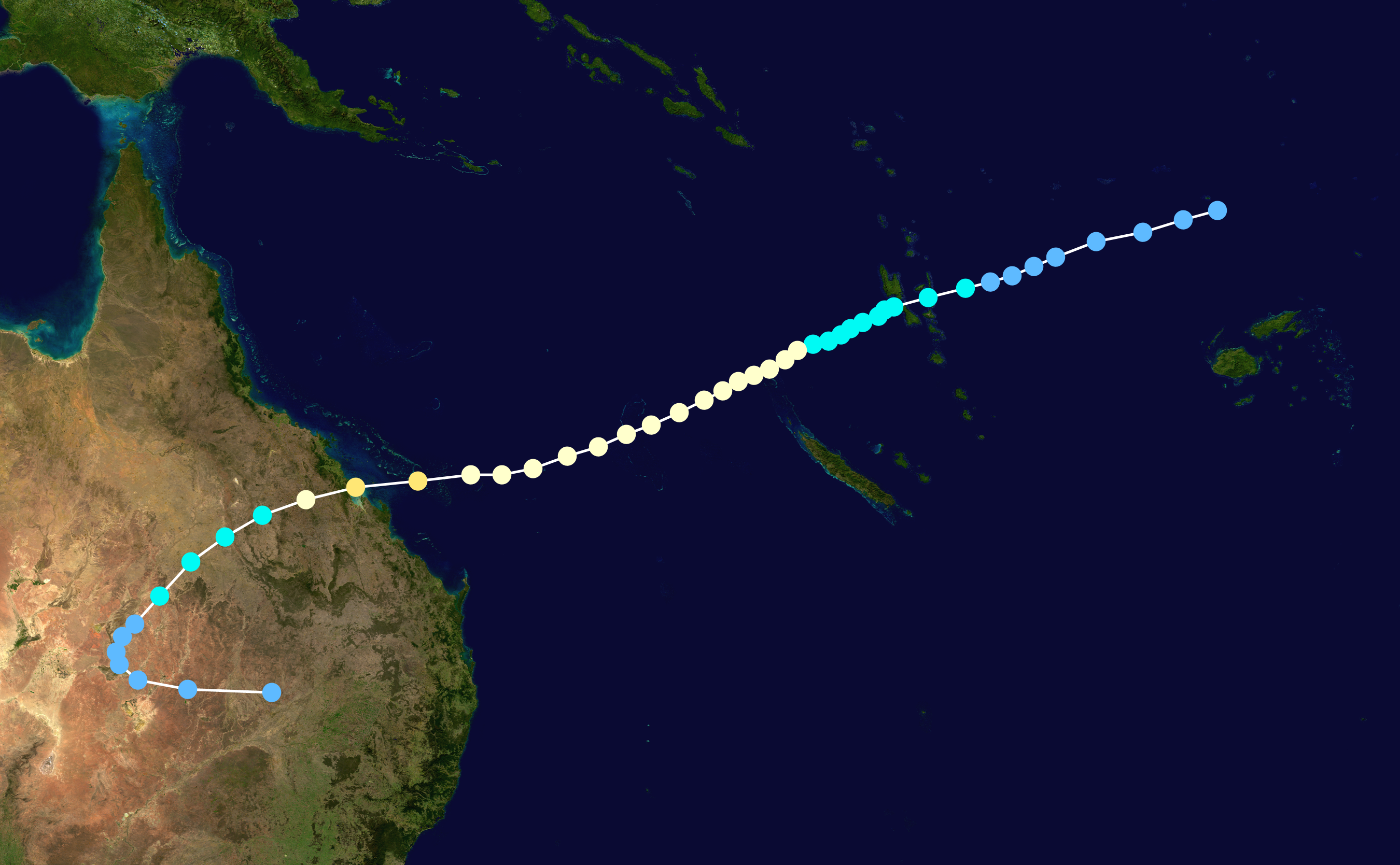
- Duration: January 11 - January 17 – February 4 - February 21
- Peak intensity: 155 km/h (100 mph) (10-min); 945 hPa (mbar)

=== Tropical Cyclone Elsa ===
- Category 2 tropical cyclone (Australian scale)
- Tropical storm (SSHWS)
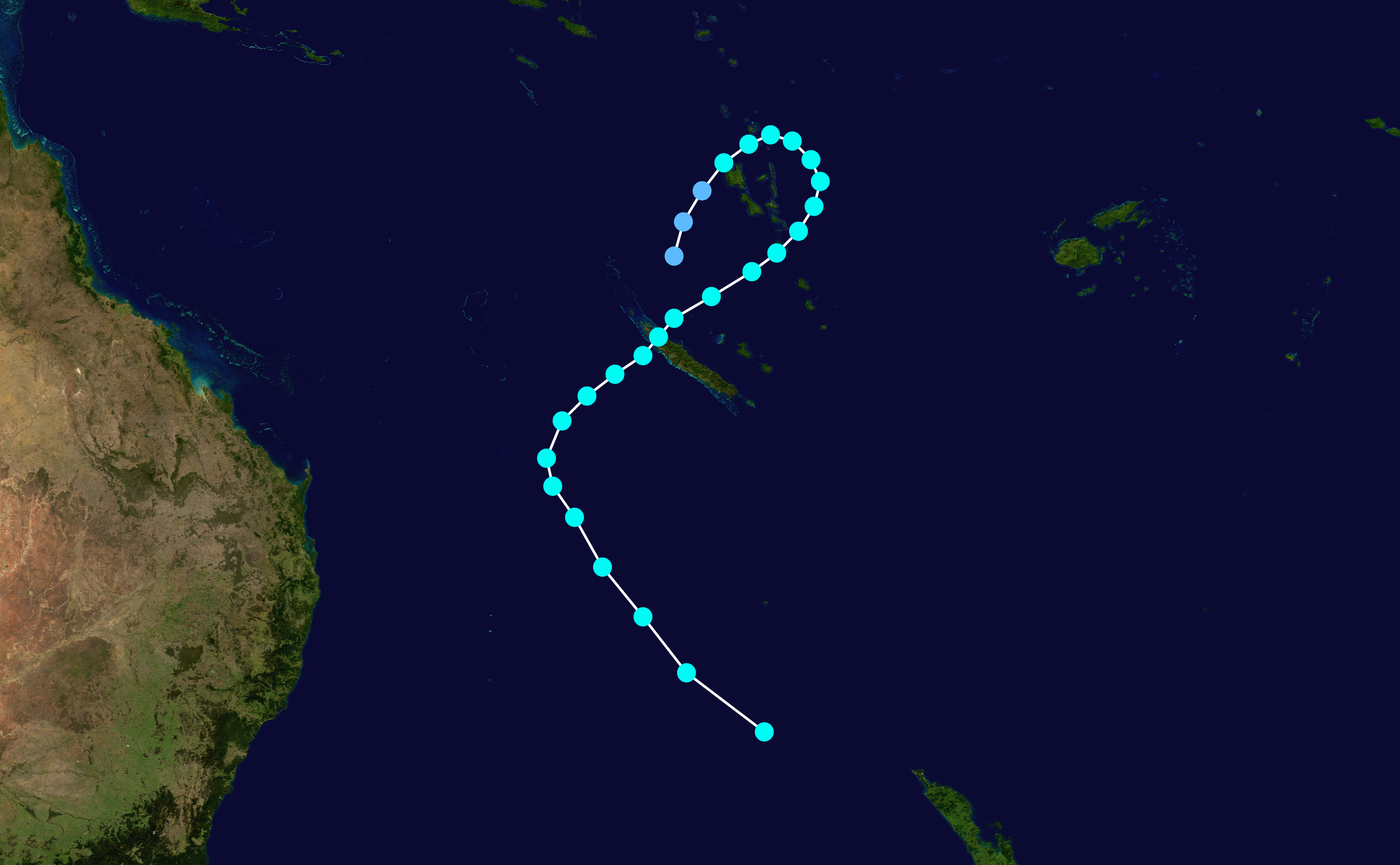
- Duration: January 20 – January 26
- Peak intensity: 95 km/h (60 mph) (10-min); 983 hPa (mbar)

=== Severe Tropical Cyclone Frances ===
- Category 3 severe tropical cyclone (Australian scale)
- Category 1 tropical cyclone (SSHWS)
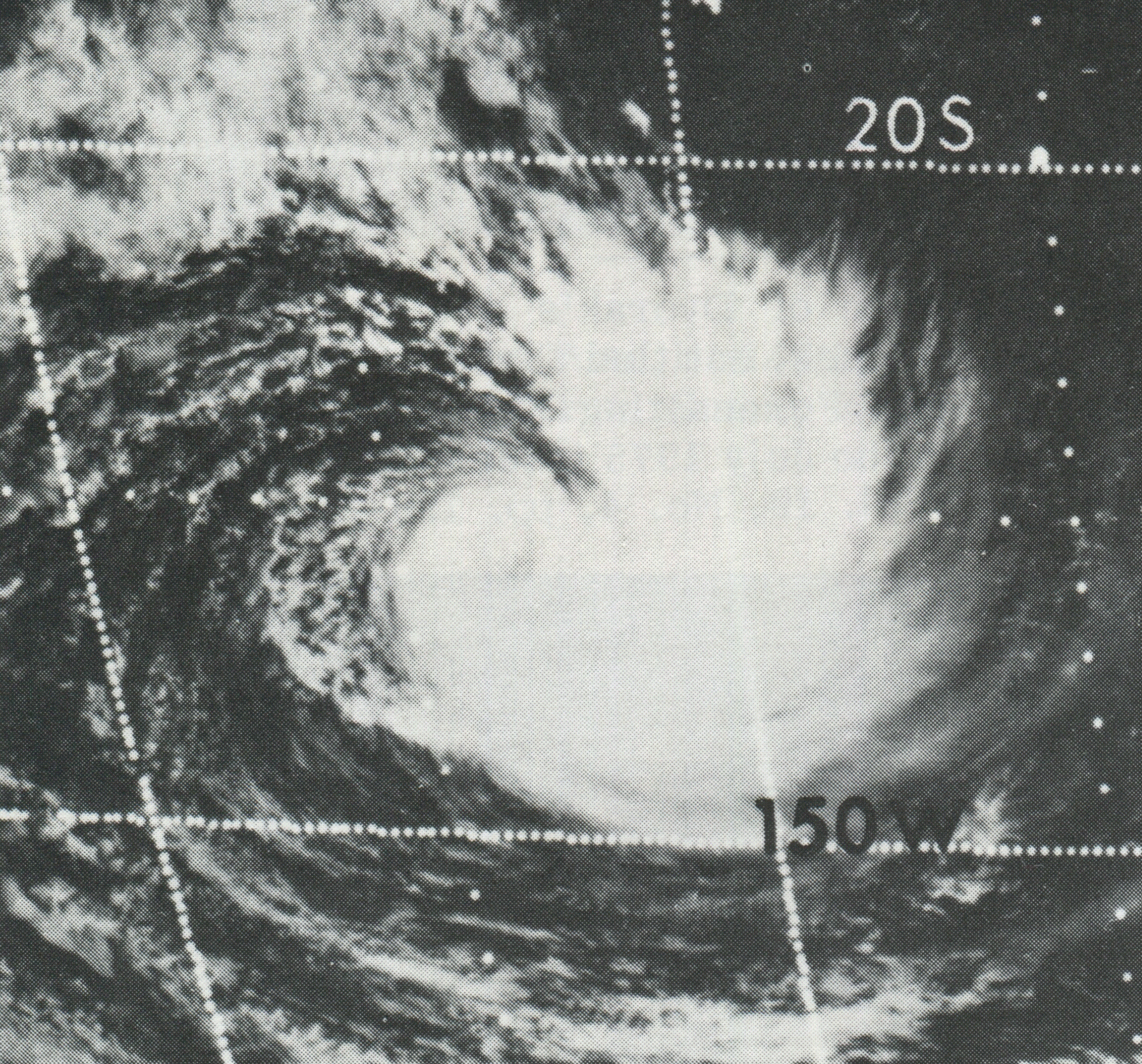
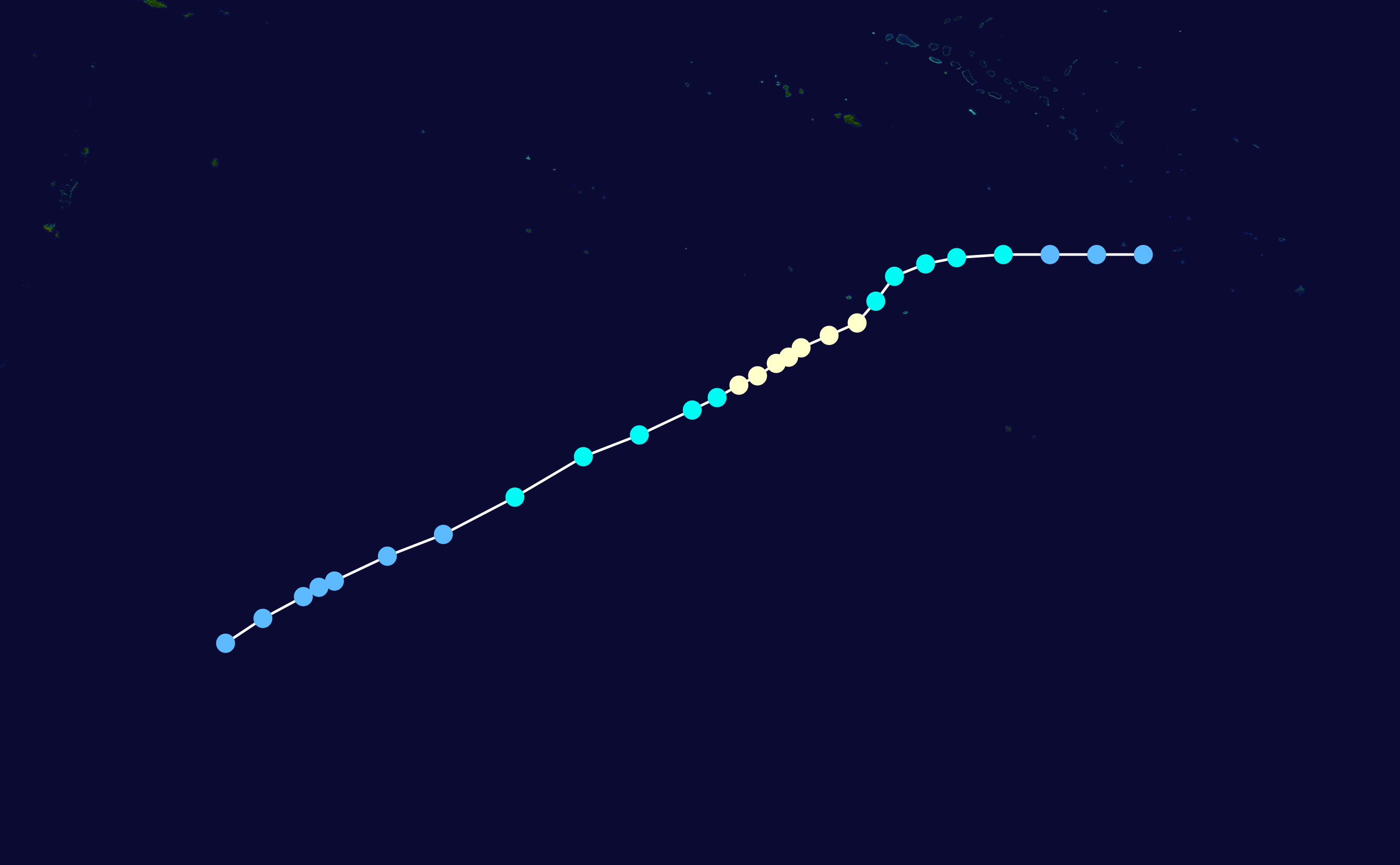
- Duration: February 2 – February 10
- Peak intensity: 130 km/h (80 mph) (10-min); 965 hPa (mbar)

=== Tropical Depression George ===
- Tropical depression (Australian scale)
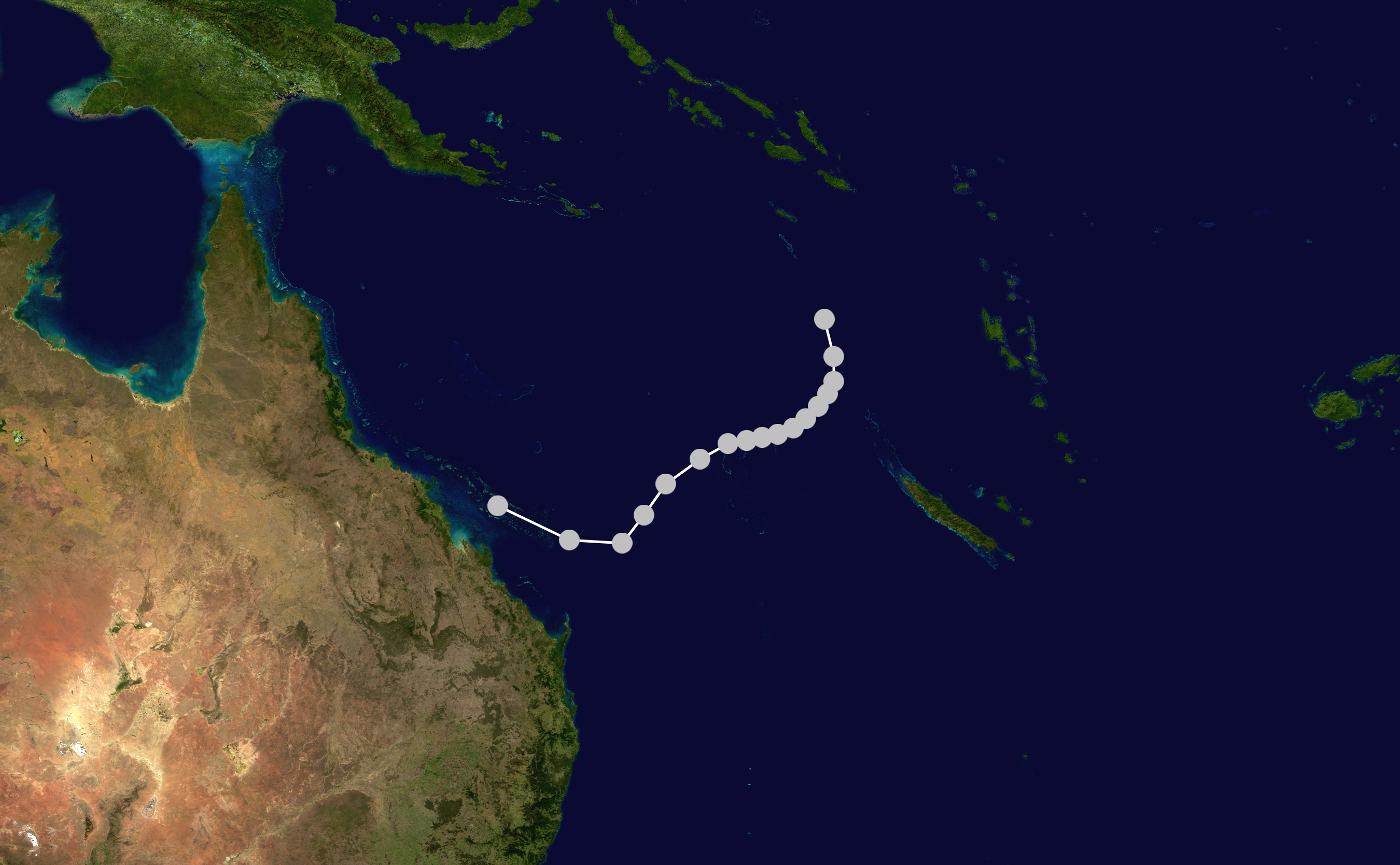
- Duration: March 9 – March 13
- Peak intensity: 30 km/h (15 mph) (10-min); 1006 hPa (mbar)

=== Tropical Cyclone Hope ===
- Category 1 tropical cyclone (Australian scale)
- Tropical storm (SSHWS)
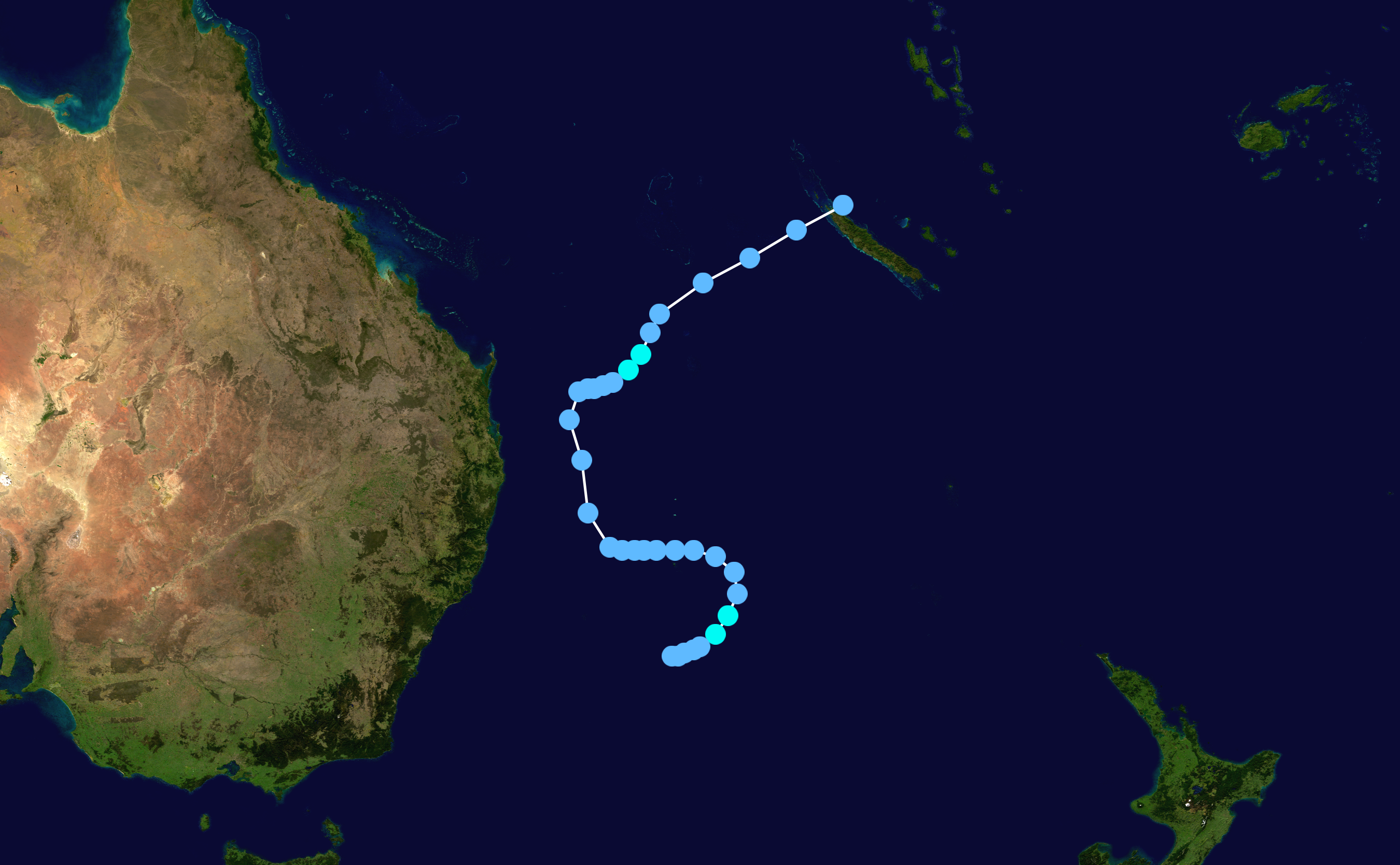
- Duration: March 17 – March 17
- Peak intensity: 65 km/h (40 mph) (10-min); 990 hPa (mbar)

=== Tropical Cyclone Jan ===
- Category 1 tropical cyclone (Australian scale)
- Tropical storm (SSHWS)
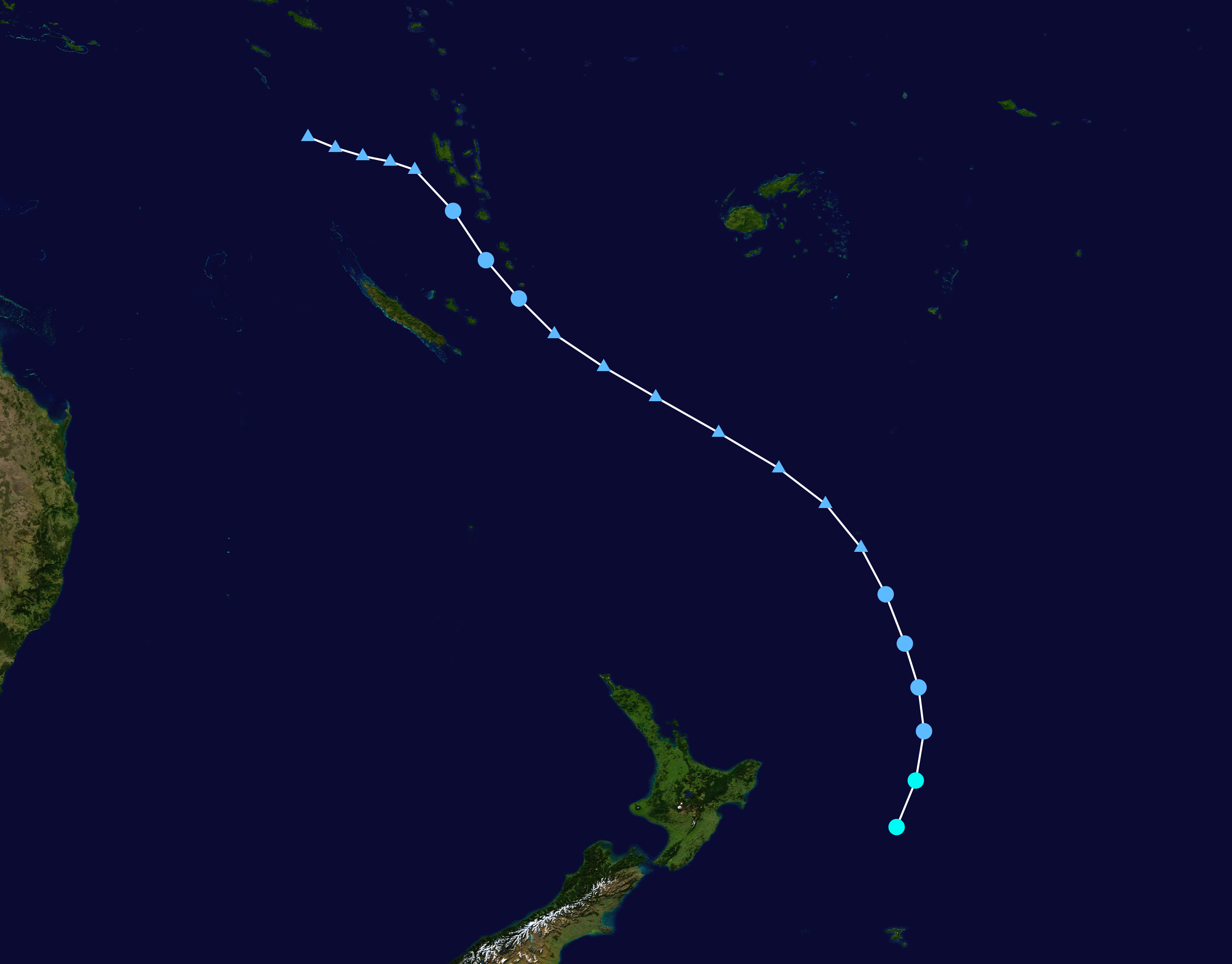
- Duration: April 16 – April 22
- Peak intensity: 85 km/h (50 mph) (10-min); 980 hPa (mbar)

=== Severe Tropical Cyclone Watorea ===
- Category 3 severe tropical cyclone (Australian scale)
- Category 1 tropical cyclone (SSHWS)
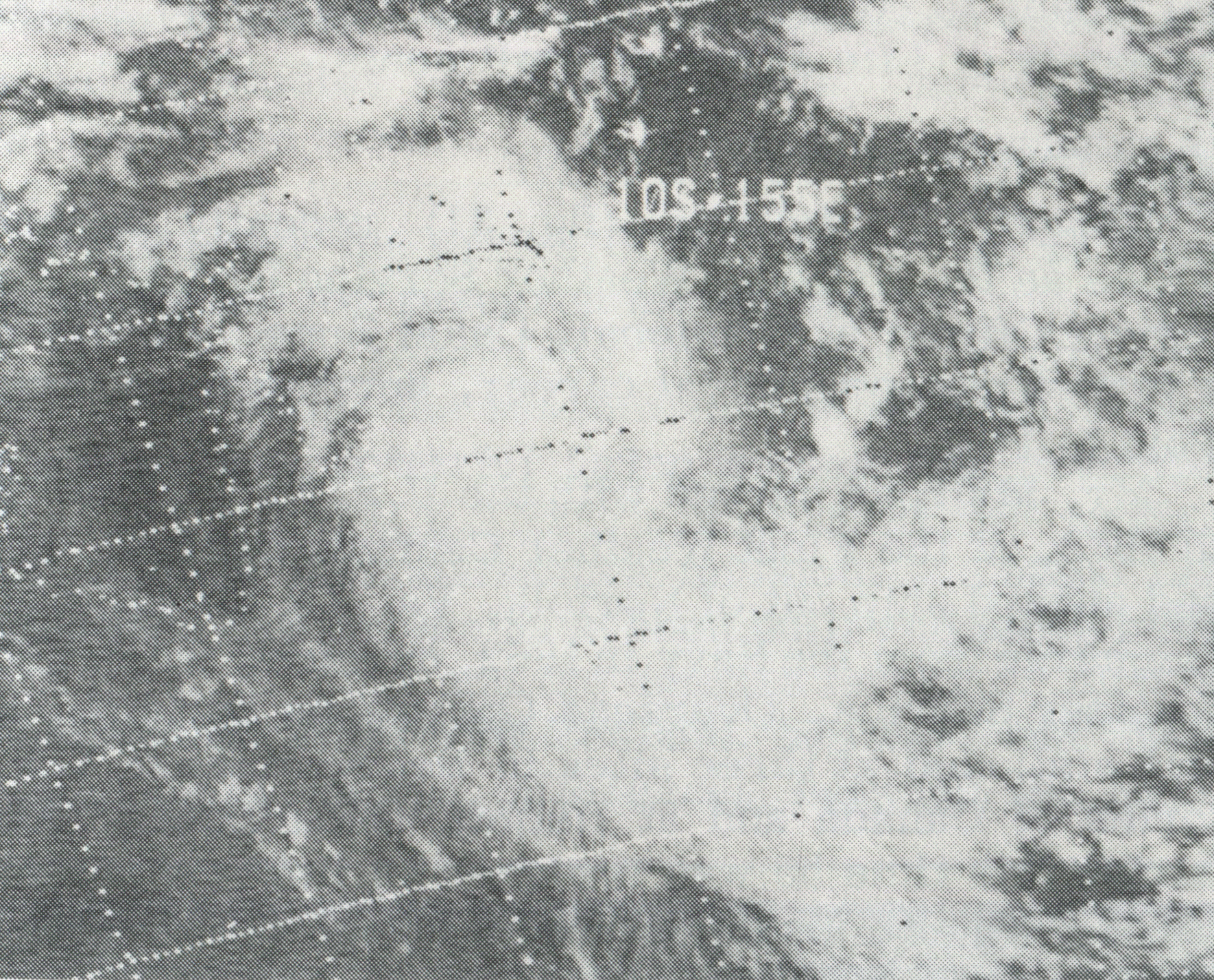
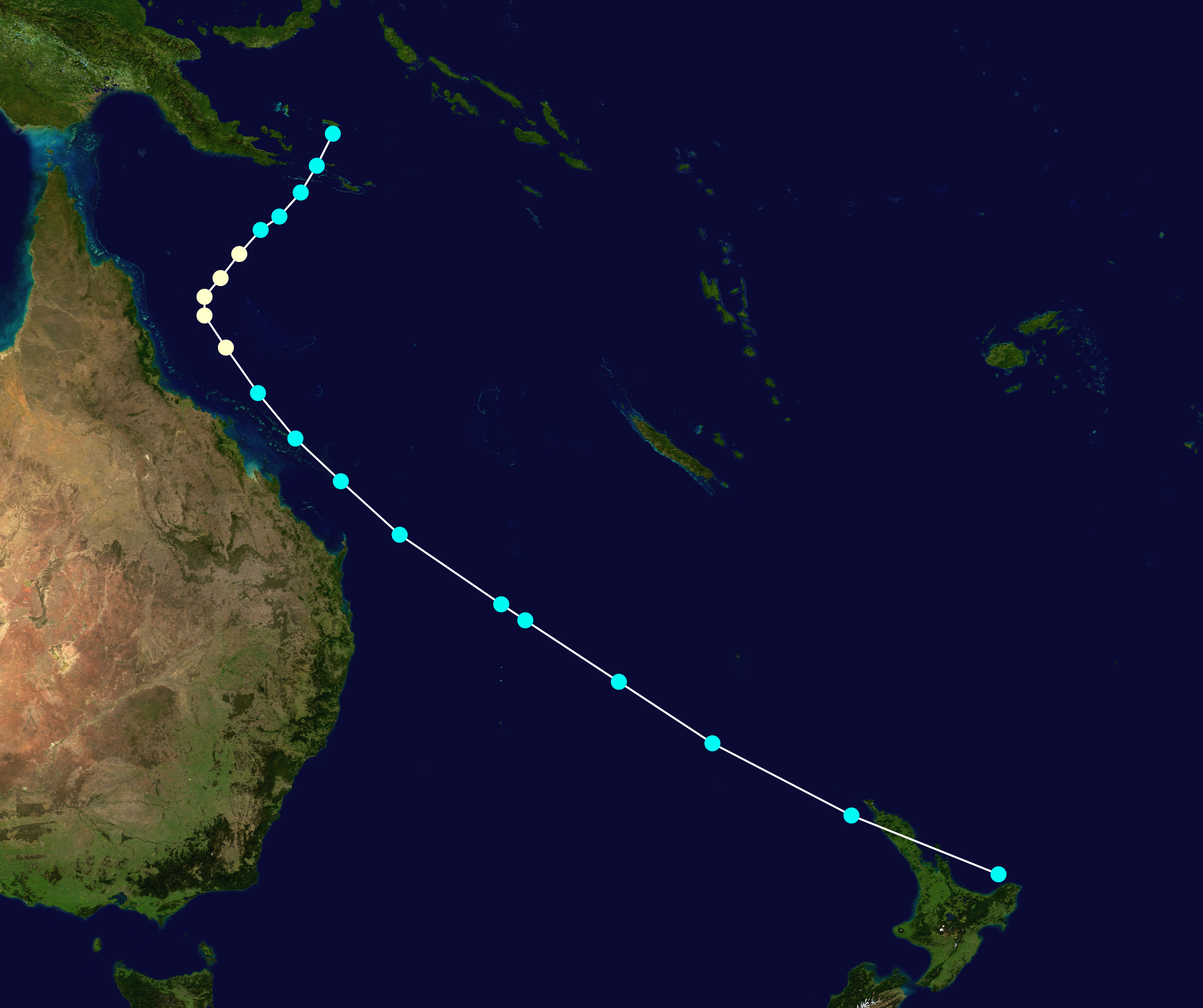
- Duration: April 27 – April 30
- Peak intensity: 130 km/h (80 mph) (10-min); 968 hPa (mbar)

== Season effects ==
1975–76 South Pacific cyclone season
Name	Dates active	Peak intensity			Areas affected	Damage (US$)	Deaths	Refs
Name	Dates active	Category	Wind speed	Pressure	Areas affected	Damage (US$)	Deaths	Refs
Unnamed	July 31 – August 4	Category 2 tropical cyclone	110 km/h (70 mph)	981 hPa (28.97 inHg)	New Caledonia	None	None	
Charlotte	January 12 – 22	Category 2 tropical cyclone	100 km/h (65 mph)	980 hPa (28.94 inHg)	None	None	None	
David	January 19 – 23	Category 3 severe tropical cyclone	155 km/h (100 mph)	945 hPa (27.91 inHg)	Vanuatu, New Caledonia, Queensland	None	None	
Elsa	January 24 – February 5	Category 3 severe tropical cyclone	155 km/h (100 mph)	965 hPa (28.50 inHg)		None	None	
Frances	March 4 – 13	Category 3 severe tropical cyclone	155 km/h (100 mph)	965 hPa (28.50 inHg)		None	None	
George	March 9 – 13	Category 3 severe tropical cyclone	155 km/h (100 mph)	965 hPa (28.50 inHg)		None	None	
Hope	March 17	Category 1 tropical cyclone	85 km/h (50 mph)	980 hPa (28.94 inHg)		None	None	
Jan	April 16 – 22	Category 1 tropical cyclone	85 km/h (50 mph)	980 hPa (28.94 inHg)		None	None	
Watorea	April 27 – 30	Category 3 severe tropical cyclone	130 km/h (80 mph)	968 hPa (28.59 inHg)		None	None	
Season aggregates
9 systems	July 31, 1975 – April 30, 1976		155 km/h (100 mph)	945 hPa (27.91 inHg)				

== See also ==
- Atlantic hurricane seasons: 1975, 1976
- Eastern Pacific hurricane seasons: 1975, 1976
- Western Pacific typhoon seasons: 1975, 1976
- North Indian Ocean cyclone seasons: 1975, 1976
