= Aneta (given name) =

Aneta is a feminine given name, a Slavic variant of Annette. Notable people with the name include:

- Aneta Avramova (born 1967), Bulgarian economist
- Aneta Corsaut (1933–1995), American actress
- Aneta Kręglicka (born 1965), Polish dancer, Miss World 1989
- Aneta Langerová (born 1986), Czech singer
- Aneta Lemiesz (born 1981), Polish runner
- Aneta Michałek (born 1991), Polish pair skater
- Aneta Pastuszka (born 1978), Polish canoer
- Aneta Soukup (born 1978), Canadian tennis player
- Aneta Spornic (born 1930), Romanian communist politician
- Aneta Tejralová (born 1996), Czech ice hockey player
- Aneta Zając (born 1982), Polish actress
