= Aneta Avramova =

Bulgarian economist

Aneta Avramova Анета Аврамова
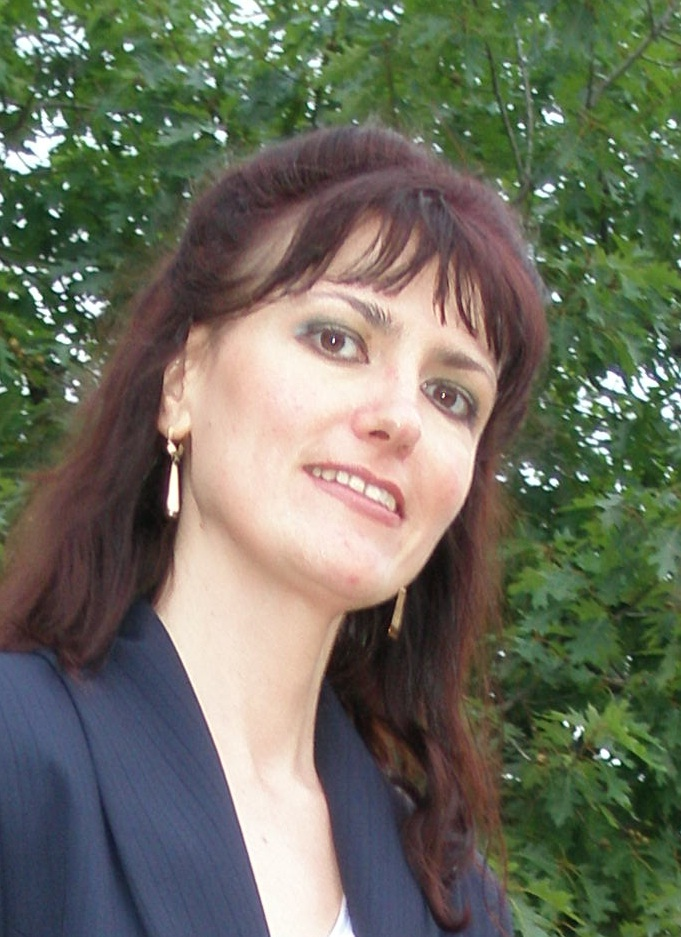

Personal details
- Born: 1967; Sofia, Bulgaria

Aneta Dimitrova Avramova (Bulgarian: Анета Димитрова Аврамова) (born 1967) is a Bulgarian economist and public relations specialist.

She graduated with honours from 7 High School in Sofia, in English.

In 1991 Avramova graduated with honours and a golden badge from the University of National and World Economy (UNWE), Sofia with a master's degree in trade (now called marketing). In 2005 she defended a thesis in integrated marketing communications named "Features in Advertising of Products Containing Objects of Intellectual Property" and has been awarded a doctor's degree. She has been giving lectures in public relations and advertising at the UNWE and NBU.

In 1995 Aneta Avramova founded the Centre for Marketing Management in Sofia - the first private education center in advertising, public relations and marketing. Besides consulting on marketing communications, the center also organised courses in advertising and public relations intended for journalists from the Bulgarian media. Leading academics from Bulgarian universities were invited as lecturers.

In her career as a public relations specialist Avramova has worked for industrial and commercial companies (Bulgartabac AD, Electricity Distribution-CEZ), for leading consulting agencies (KRES, O3PR, LWMS ), for information and specialized media (Sega daily newspaper, Meridian Match sport newspaper) and for different political organisations and NGOs. Avramova has specialized in France and Great Britain. In 1994-1995 she attended a diploma course "Communication within the Enterprise" with professional practice in Marseille at the Higher International School of Marketing and Management (MARCOM).

In 2000 she attended a diploma course "Integrated Approach to Public Relations" at London School of Public Relations (LSPR) in London. This Diploma in PR is approved by PRCA and National Union of Journalists in GB. Subsequently, she helped start an affiliate office of this school in Sofia.

She has presented reports on economic and media conferences and forums of various communication agencies. She is an author of numerous articles on issues of integrated marketing communications published in "Economy" Magazine, "Media World" Magazine, "Intellectual Property" Magazine, etc.
