= Annett =

Annett may refer to:

== Surname ==
- Annett (Hampshire cricketer), played first class cricket 1788–1792
- Chloë Annett (born 1971), English actress
- Max Annett (1931–2015), Australian rower
- Michael Annett (1986–2025), American motor racing driver
- Niall Annett (born 1991), Irish rugby player
- Paul Annett (1937–2017), English director

== Given name ==
- Annett Böhm (born 1980), German judoka
- Annett Davis (born 1973), American beach volleyball player
- Annett Fleischer (born 1979), German actress
- Annett Gamm (born 1977), German diver
- Annett Hesselbarth (born 1966), retired German sprinter
- Annett Horna (born 1987), German athlete
- Annett Louisan (born 1977), German singer
- Annett Neumann (born 1970), German cyclist
- Annett Renneberg (born 1978), German actress and singer
- Annett Rex (born 1969), German swimmer
- Annett Wagner-Michel (born 1955), German chess player
- Annett Wolf (1936–2025), Danish director

== Other uses ==
- Annett's key, a component of railway signalling
