= 1976 Pacific hurricane season =

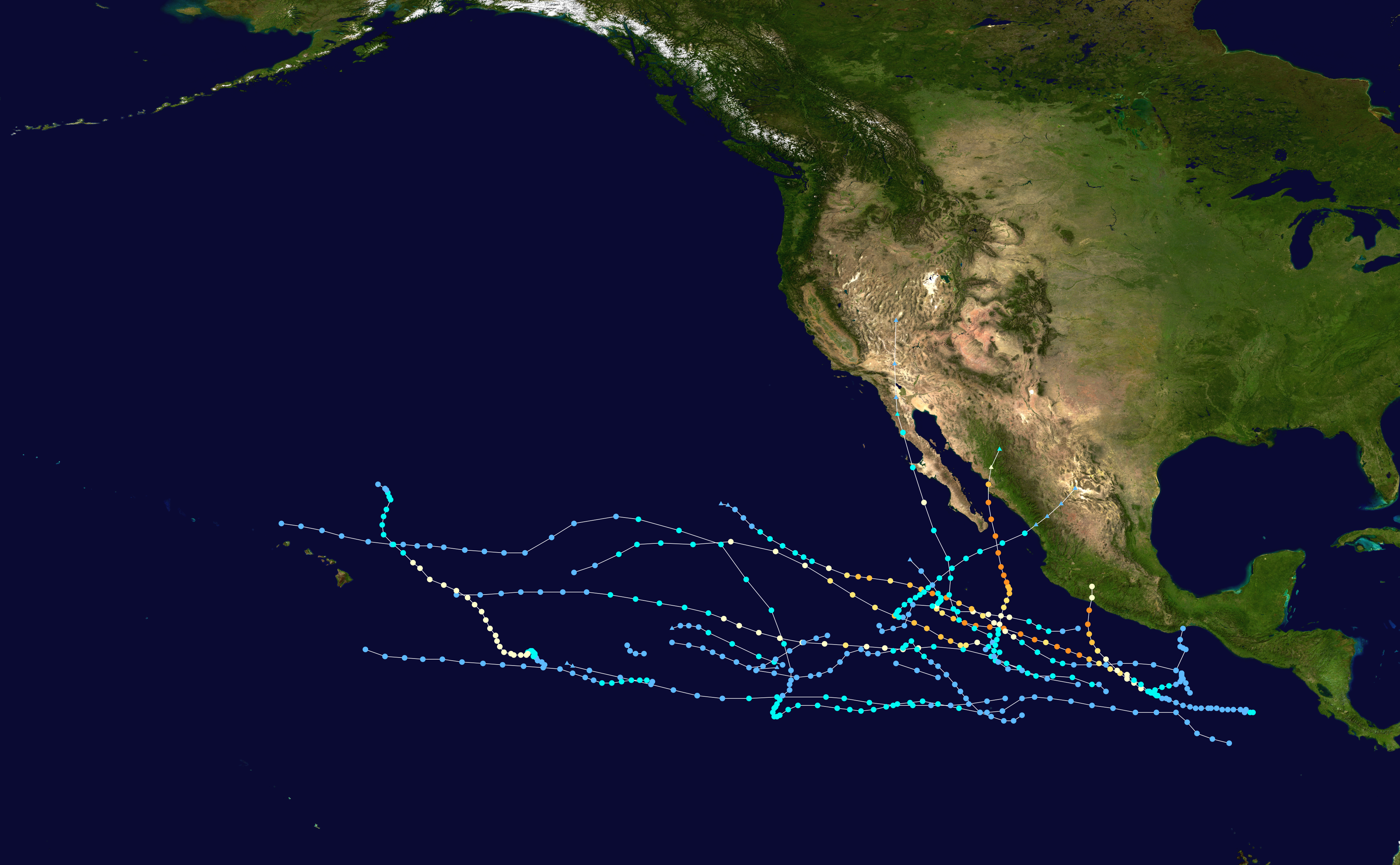
- Season summary map

Seasonal boundaries
- First system formed: June 2, 1976
- Last system dissipated: October 29, 1976

Strongest storm
- By maximum sustained winds: Madeline
  - Maximum winds: 145 mph (230 km/h) (1-minute sustained)
  - Lowest pressure: 940 mbar (hPa; 27.76 inHg)
- By central pressure: Annette
  - Maximum winds: 140 mph (220 km/h) (1-minute sustained)
  - Lowest pressure: 925 mbar (hPa; 27.32 inHg)

Seasonal statistics
- Total depressions: 19
- Total storms: 15
- Hurricanes: 9
- Major hurricanes (Cat. 3+): 5
- Total fatalities: 614-964 total
- Total damage: $360 million (1976 USD)

Related articles
- 1976 Atlantic hurricane season; 1976 Pacific typhoon season; 1976 North Indian Ocean cyclone season

The 1976 Pacific hurricane season was a very deadly and costly season. Hurricanes Kathleen, Liza, and Madeline were the most notable storms this year. Hurricane Kathleen caused death and destruction in California and Arizona due to flooding. Hurricane Liza was the deadliest storm of the season when it killed over 600 people in Mexico. Hurricane Madeline is notable for being one of the most intense Pacific hurricanes at landfall.

== Season summary ==
The season officially started May 15, 1976, in the eastern Pacific, and June 1, 1976, in the central Pacific, and lasted until November 30, 1976. These dates conventionally delimit the period of each year when most tropical cyclones form in the northeastern Pacific Ocean. In practice, the season lasted from the formation of the first storm on June 2 to the dissipation of the last on October 30.

This season had a slightly below average number of tropical storms, with fourteen. The number of hurricanes was average, with eight. The season had an above-average number of major hurricanes, with five reaching Category 3 or higher on the Saffir-Simpson Hurricane Scale. Four of tropical depressions dissipated before they could reach tropical storm strength. There were five landfalls, including three by consecutive storms. In the Central Pacific, one tropical cyclone, a hurricane formed. Two storms entered the region from the east. These totals are close to average.

== Systems ==
=== Hurricane Annette ===
- Category 4 hurricane (SSHWS)
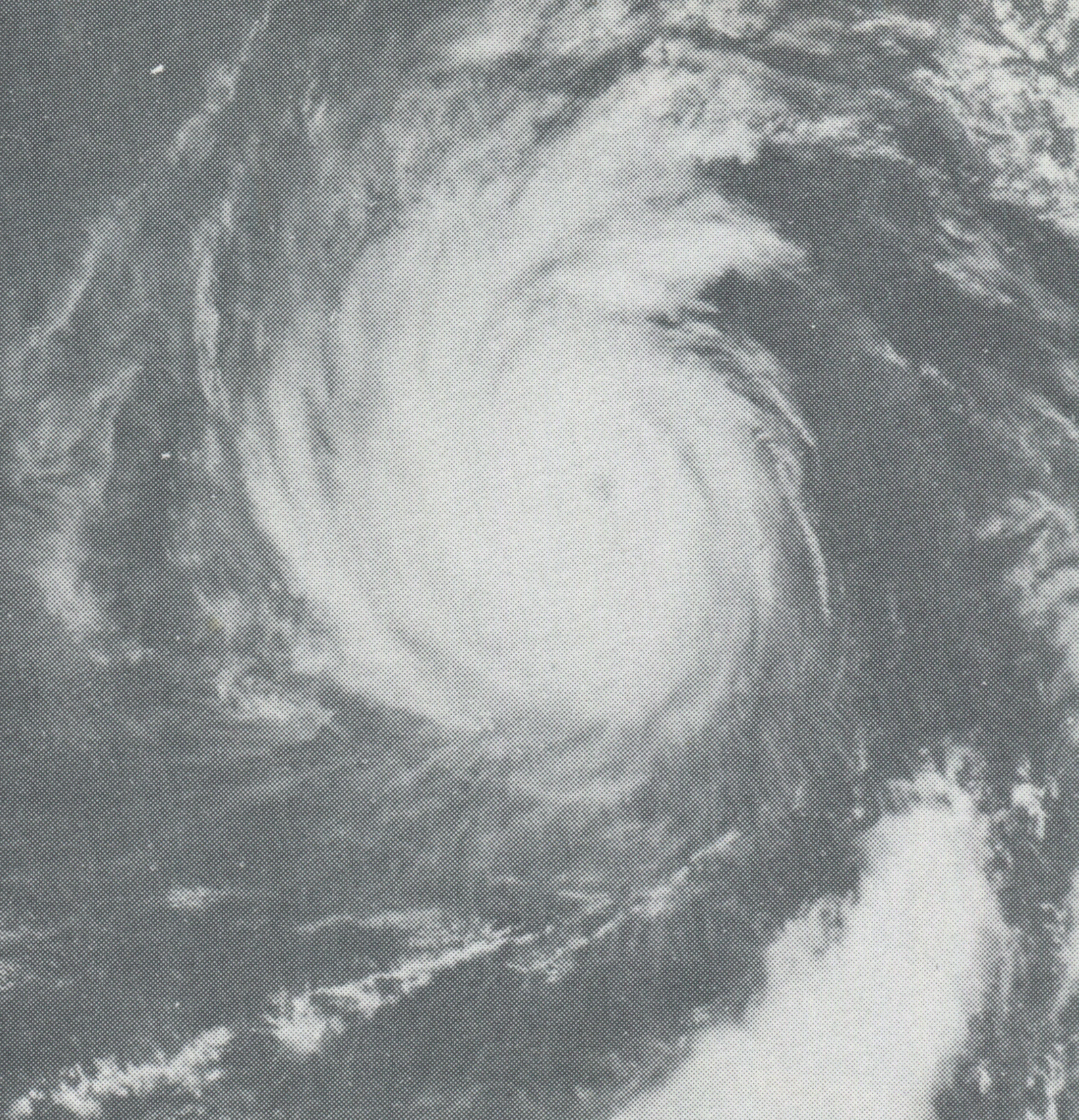
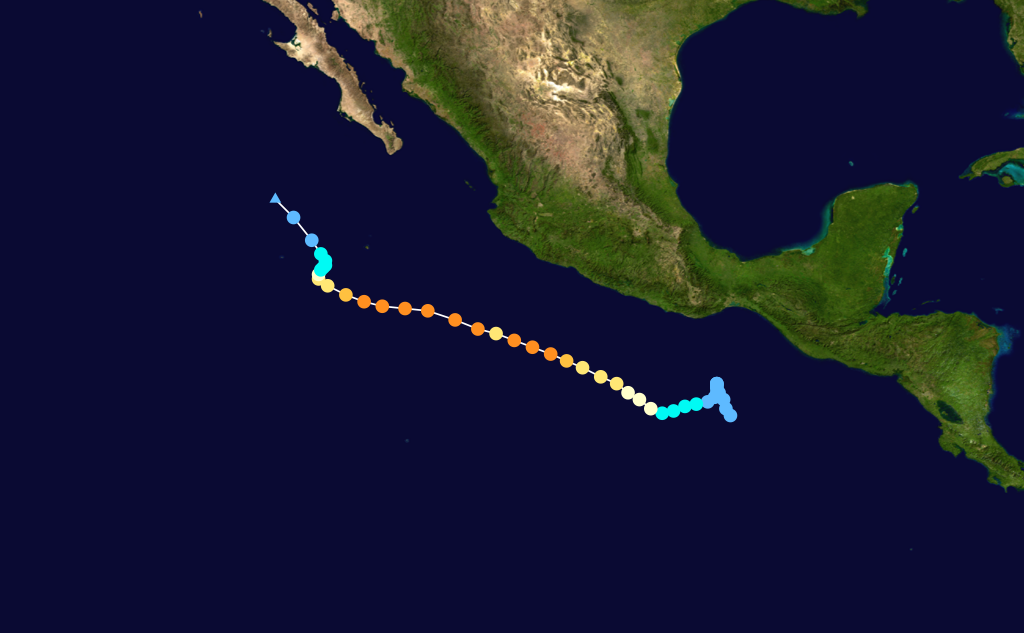
- Duration: June 3 – June 14
- Peak intensity: 140 mph (220 km/h) (1-min); 925 mbar (hPa)

A tropical disturbance formed well south of the Gulf of Tehuantepec on June 2. It organized into a tropical depression around 00:00 UTC on June 3 but initially failed to intensify further, due in part to its loosely defined circulation. Following a consolidation of its center, the cyclone finally strengthened into Tropical Storm Annette early on June 6 and entered a period of steady to rapid development. Annette became the season's first hurricane by 06:00 UTC on June 7, coincident with indications of an eye on satellite imagery. It became a major hurricane late on June 8 and reached Category 4 intensity with peak winds of 140 mph (230 km/h) the next day, when a reconnaissance aircraft measured a minimum atmospheric pressure of 925 mbar (hPa; 27.32 inHg). Annette slowed and curved north after its peak, bringing the cyclone over colder waters that prompted weakening. The hurricane was downgraded to a tropical storm early on June 12 and further to a tropical depression late the next day. Annette dissipated by 06:00 UTC on June 14.

=== Hurricane Bonny ===
- Category 1 hurricane (SSHWS)
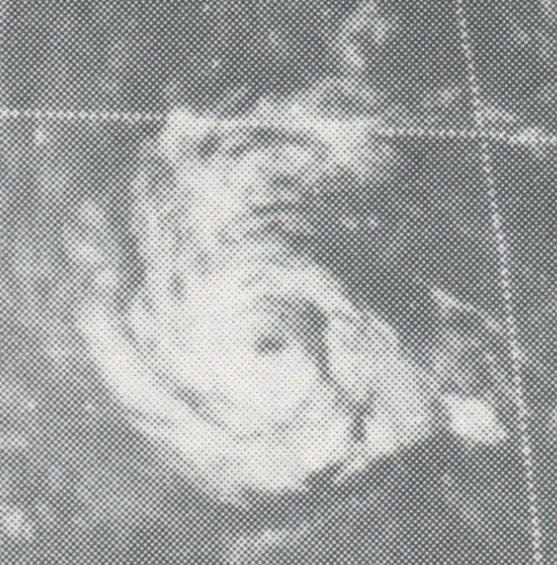
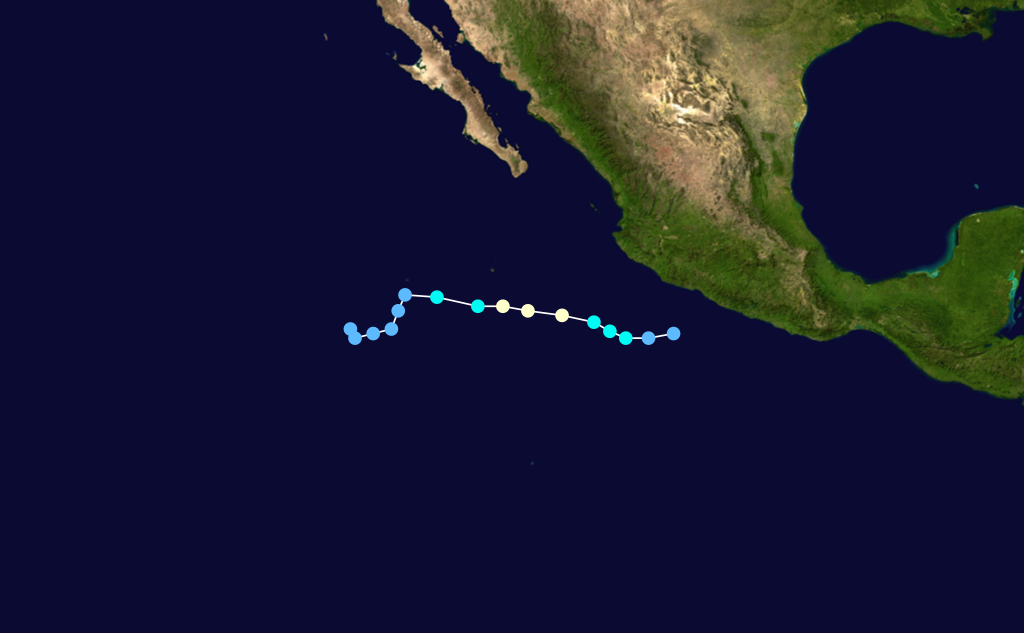
- Duration: June 26 – June 29
- Peak intensity: 75 mph (120 km/h) (1-min); 987 mbar (hPa)

A tropical disturbance formed about 335 miles (539 km) south of Acapulco, Guerrero, early on June 22, only slowly consolidating into a tropical depression by 00:00 UTC on June 26. On a westward track, it strengthened into Tropical Storm Bonny twelve hours after formation and further organized into a hurricane around 06:00 UTC on June 27, attaining peak winds of 75 mph (121 km/h). This forward trajectory brought the system over cooler waters, causing Bonny to weaken to rapidly weaken to a tropical depression by early on June 28. It moved erratically before dissipating around 18:00 UTC the next day.

=== Tropical Storm Celeste ===
- Tropical storm (SSHWS)
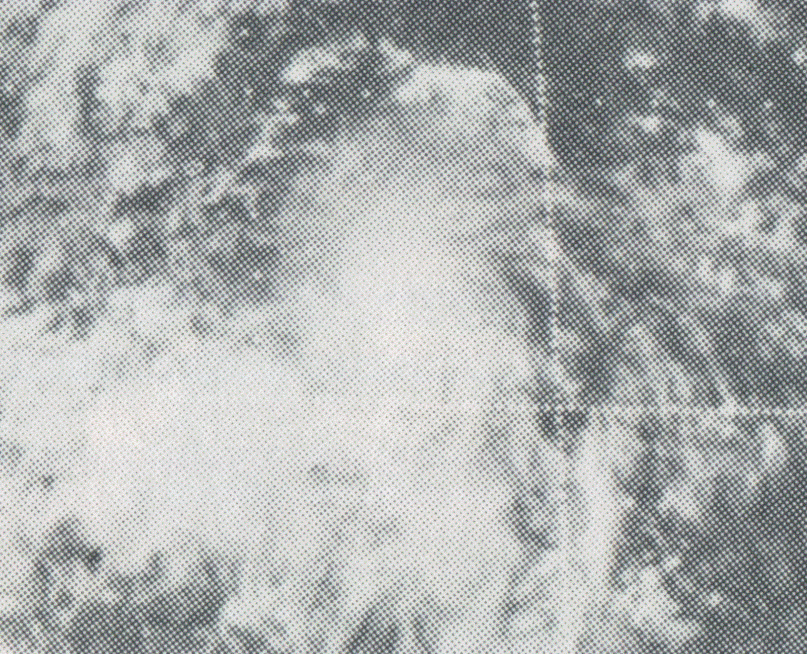
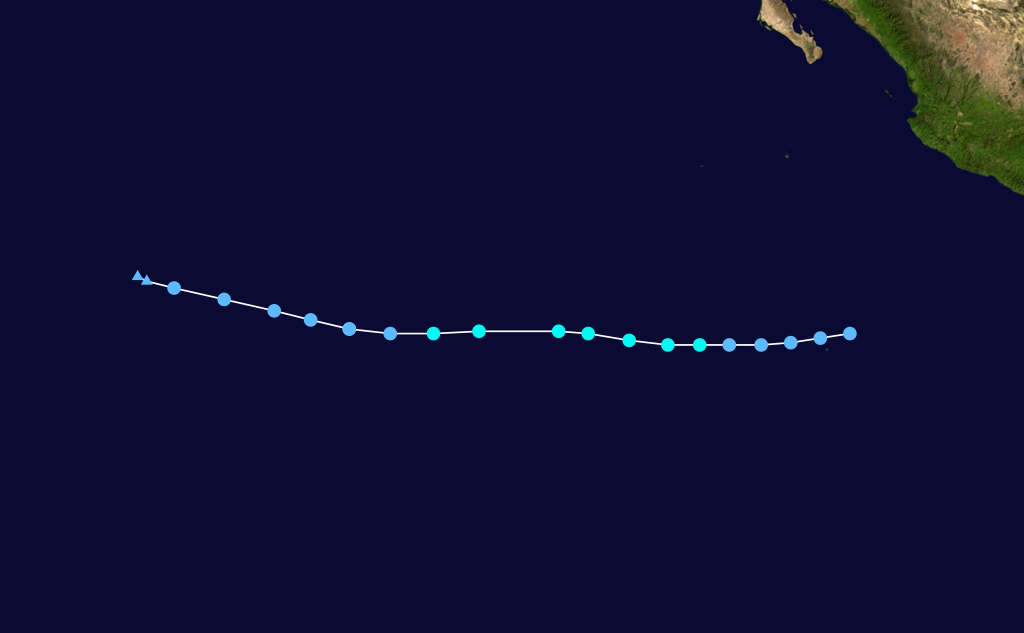
- Duration: July 14 – July 19
- Peak intensity: 50 mph (85 km/h) (1-min);

On July 14, a tropical disturbance formed about 655 miles (1,054 km) southwest of Acapulco, Guerrero; it rapidly developed into a tropical depression around 12:00 UTC that day. The depression intensified into Tropical Storm Celeste late on July 15, and it continued to gather strength as it moved west, reaching peak winds of 50 mph (80 km/h) on July 16 as a transient eye appeared on satellite imagery. The effects of cooler water impeded further development, and the storm rapidly weakened to a tropical depression early on July 17 before dissipating around 06:00 UTC on July 19.

=== Hurricane Diana ===
- Category 2 hurricane (SSHWS)
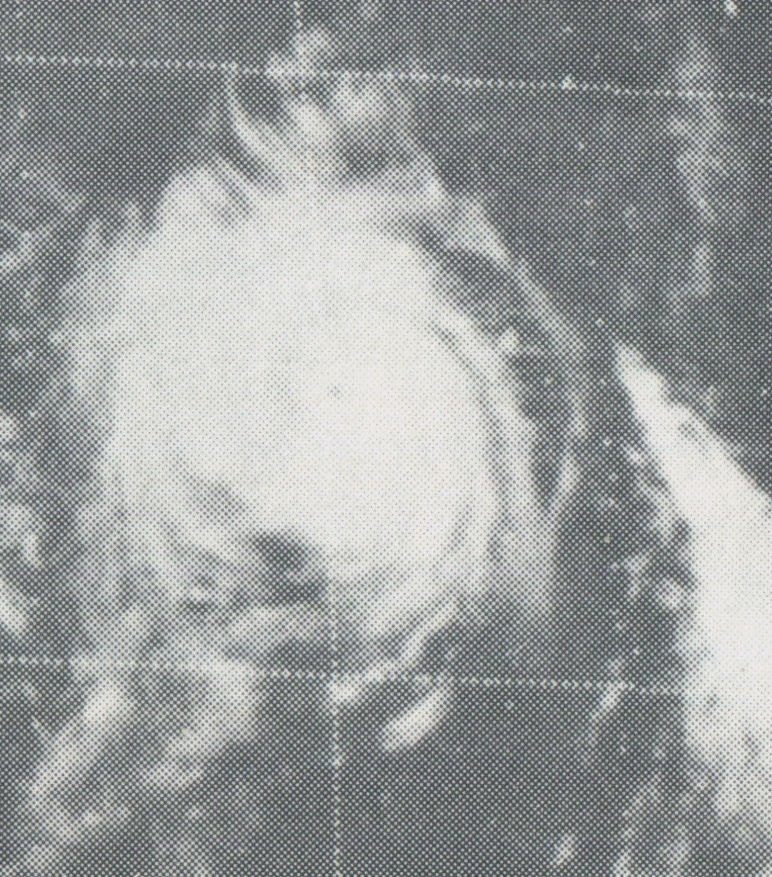
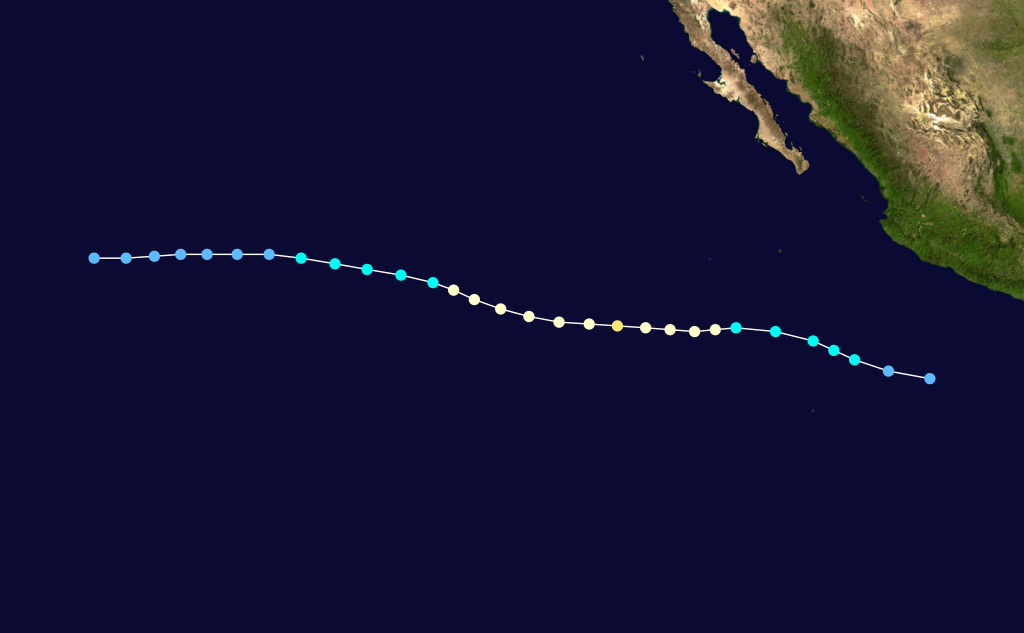
- Duration: July 16 – July 23
- Peak intensity: 100 mph (155 km/h) (1-min);

A day after the formation of Celeste, a new tropical disturbance formed roughly 460 miles (740 km) south of Acapulco, Guerrero, organizing into the season's sixth tropical depression around 00:00 UTC on July 16. A sprawling storm, the system strengthened into Tropical Storm Diana twelve hours later. It reached hurricane strength the next day and continued to intensify, peaking as a Category 2 hurricane with winds of 100 mph (160 km/h) around 18:00 UTC on July 18. A continual west-northwest track brought Diana over progressively cooler waters, causing it to weaken to a tropical storm again early on July 20. After further degrading to a tropical depression, the system crossed into the Central Pacific Hurricane Center's area of responsibility, where it maintained its status as a tropical cyclone until dissipating around 06:00 UTC on July 23.

=== Tropical Storm Estelle ===
- Tropical storm (SSHWS)
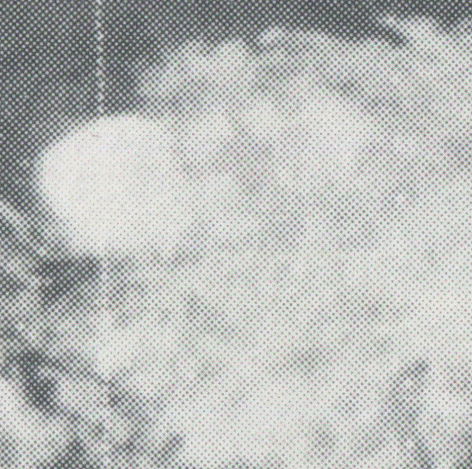
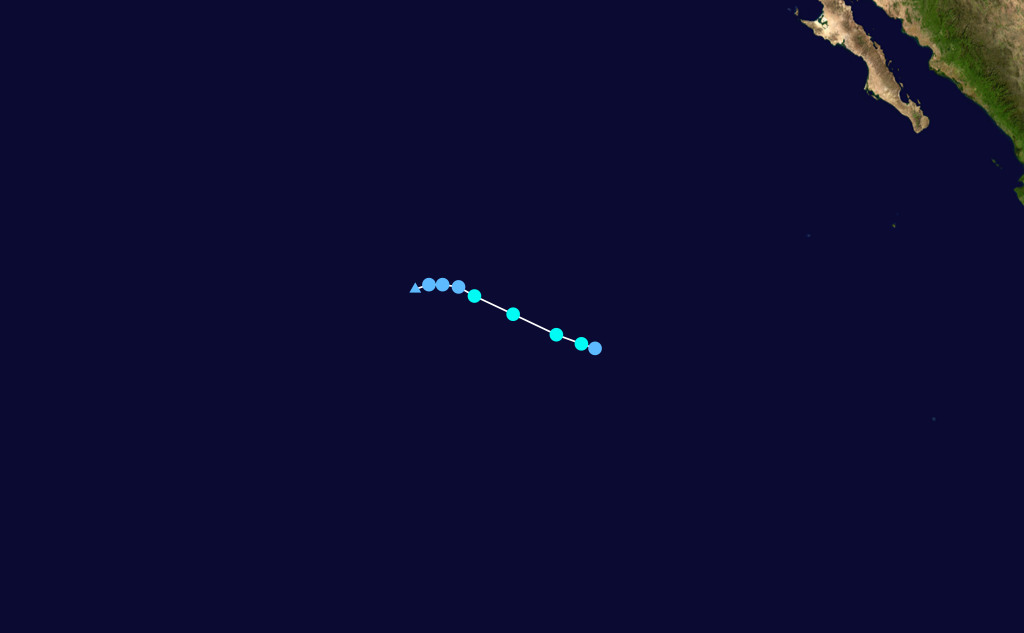
- Duration: July 27 – July 28
- Peak intensity: 40 mph (65 km/h) (1-min);

On July 24, a large area of disturbed weather developed about 1,035 miles (1,666 km) southwest of Acapulco, Guerrero. This complex became composed of two distinctly separate areas of low pressure late on July 26. The eastern circulation organized into a tropical depression around 00:00 UTC on July 27 and further strengthened into Tropical Storm Estelle six hours later. Moving swiftly toward the west, the system failed to intensify beyond minimal tropical storm intensity, instead weakening to a tropical depression again by 06:00 UTC on July 28 as it moved into cooler waters. After losing its convective structure, Estelle dissipated around 00:00 UTC on July 29.

=== Tropical Storm Fernanda ===
- Tropical storm (SSHWS)
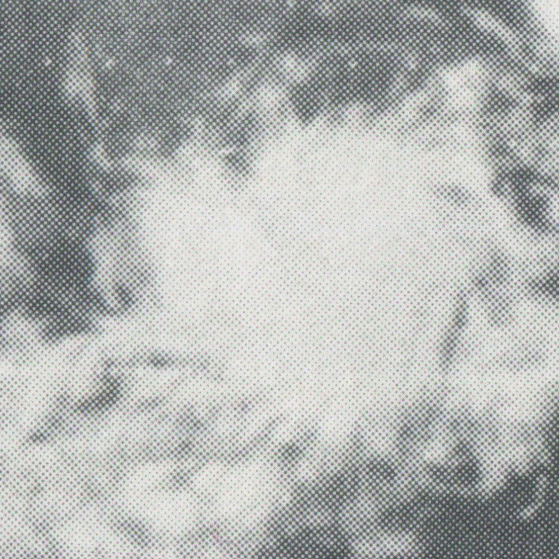
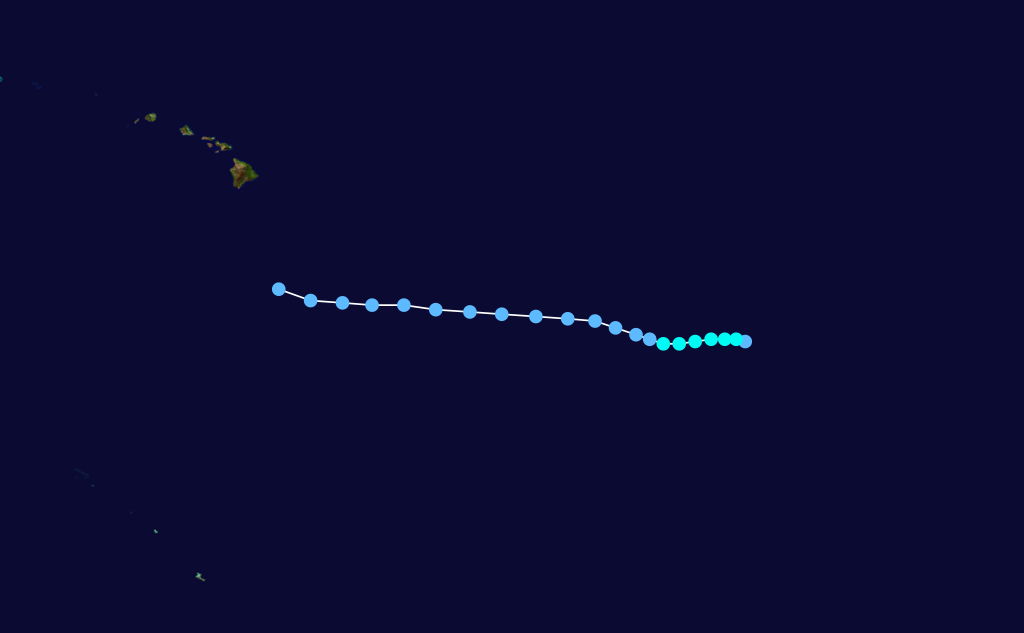
- Duration: July 28 – August 2
- Peak intensity: 40 mph (65 km/h) (1-min);

Fernanda developed out of the same area of disturbed weather that first formed on July 24 and split into two separate circulations two days later. While the easternmost low organized into Tropical Storm Estelle, the western circulation developed into a tropical depression by 00:00 UTC on July 28. It intensified into a tropical storm six hours later. Like Estelle, however, the cyclone failed to intensify beyond minimal tropical storm strength. The compact storm instead weakened to a tropical depression by 18:00 UTC on July 29, shortly before it entered the Central Pacific Hurricane Center's area of responsibility. It dissipated around 00:00 UTC on August 2.

=== Tropical Storm Gwen ===
- Tropical storm (SSHWS)
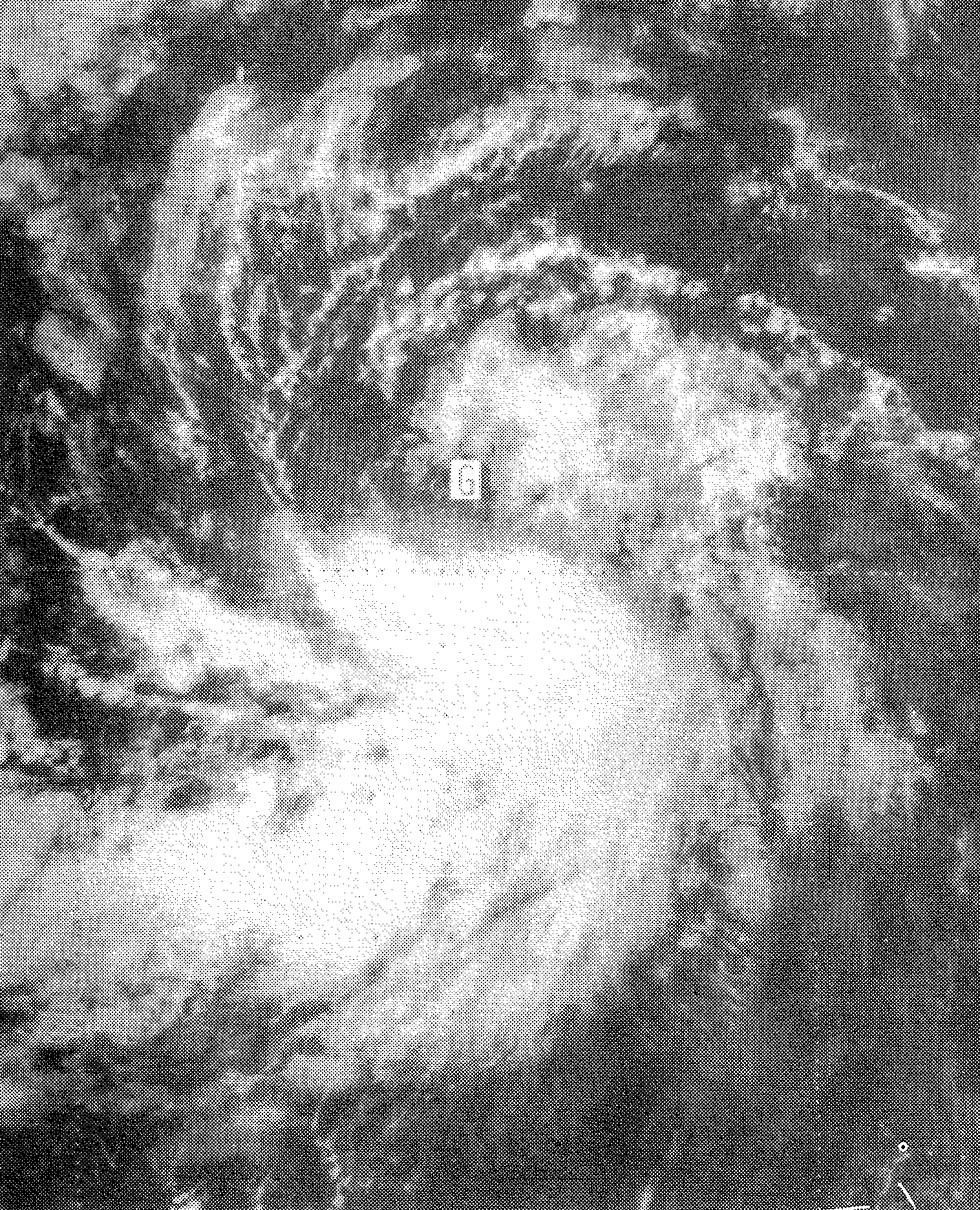
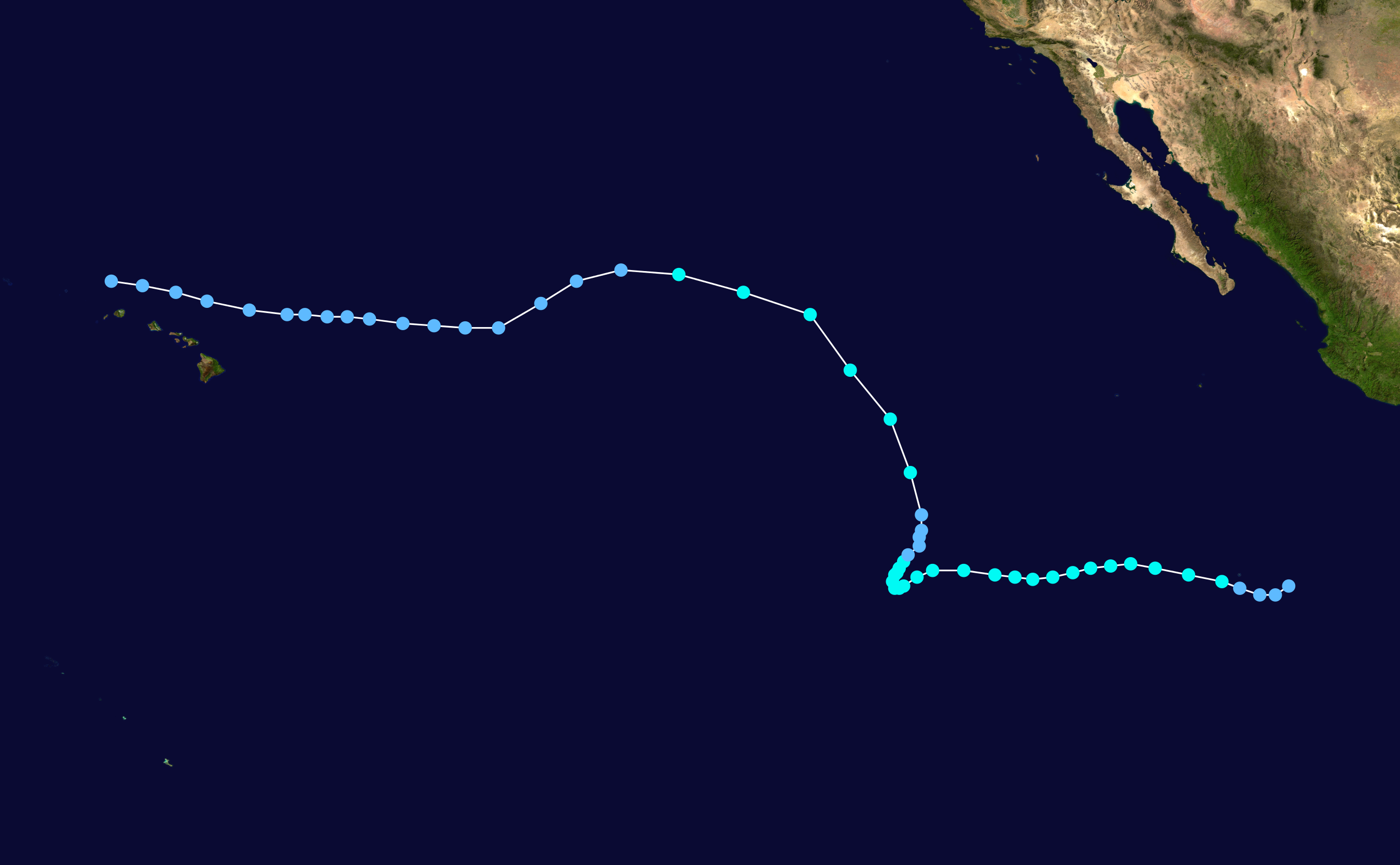
- Duration: August 5 – August 18
- Peak intensity: 65 mph (100 km/h) (1-min);

An area of disturbed weather formed roughly 435 miles (700 km) south of Acapulco, Guerrero, on August 3. The westward-moving disturbance organized into a tropical depression by 00:00 UTC on August 5 and further developed into Tropical Storm Gwen about 24 hours later. The newly named storm continued to intensify, reaching peak winds of 65 mph (105 km/h) on August 8. Thereafter, a deceleration of the storm's forward speed over a patch of colder waters prompted weakening, and Gwen fell to tropical depression strength early on August 11. Rapidly-developing Hurricane Hyacinth to its east forced the weak cyclone to move abruptly north, during which time Gwen regained its status as a tropical storm around 18:00 UTC on August 12. This redevelopment was short-lived, as Gwen weakened to a tropical depression yet again on August 14 as it absorbed the weakening Hyacinth and crossed into the Central Pacific Hurricane Center's area of responsibility. Gwen moved westward and passed north of the Hawaiian Islands before dissipating around 06:00 UTC on August 18.

=== Hurricane Hyacinth ===
- Category 3 hurricane (SSHWS)
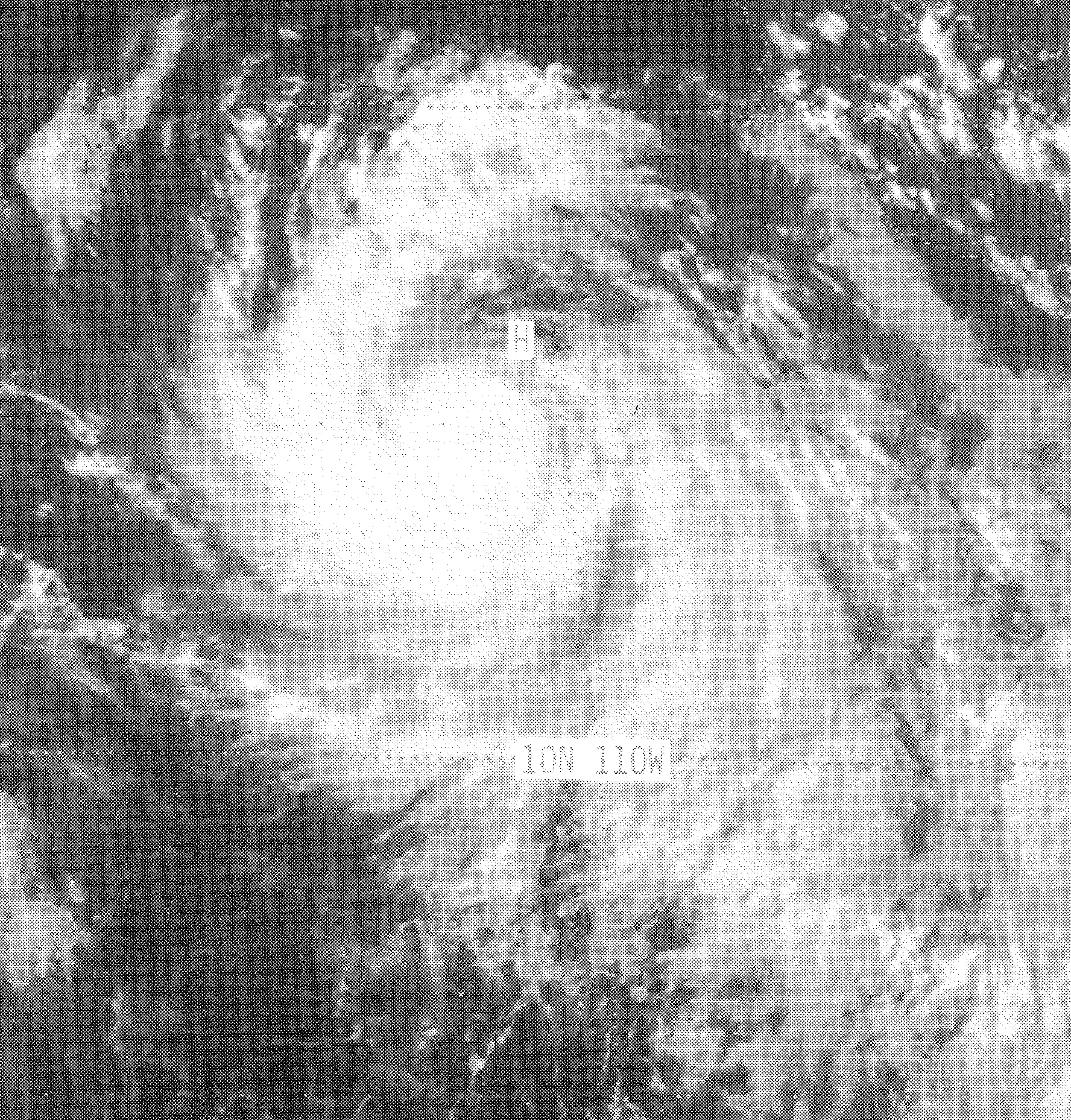
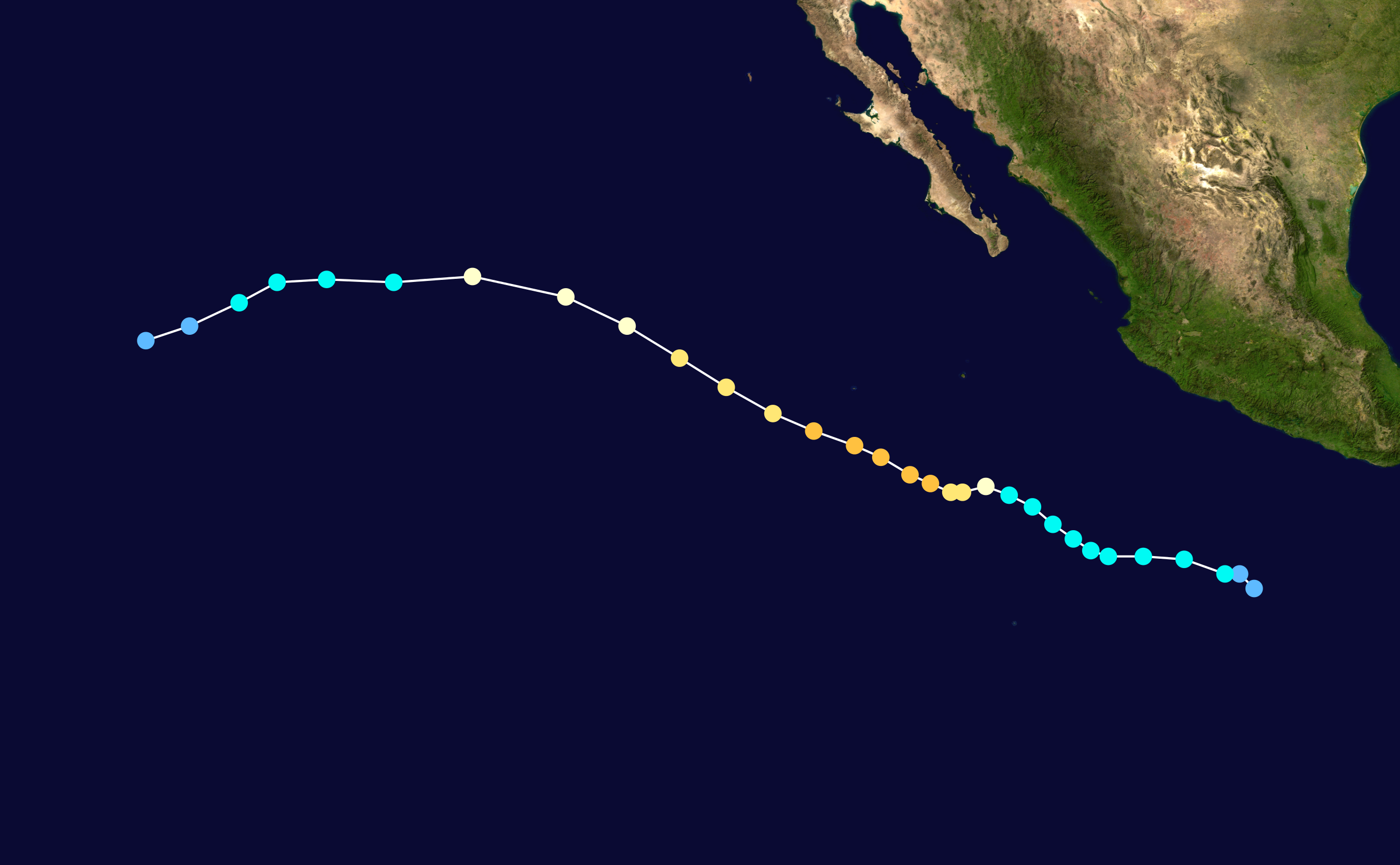
- Duration: August 6 – August 14
- Peak intensity: 115 mph (185 km/h) (1-min);

An area of disturbed weather formed well south of Mexico around 18:00 UTC on August 5. It intensified into a tropical depression 24 hours later and further organized into Tropical Storm Hyacinth by 06:00 UTC on August 7. On a west-northwest track, the storm continued to strengthen and became a hurricane around 12:00 UTC on August 9, after which time a small yet distinct eye became evident on satellite imagery. Hyacinth attained its peak as a Category 3 hurricane with winds of 115 mph (185 km/h) the next day, but soon began to weaken as it rapidly moved toward cooler waters. It weakened to a tropical storm early on August 13 and further degraded to a tropical depression on August 14 before being absorbed by nearby Tropical Storm Gwen around 06:00 UTC that day.

=== Hurricane Iva ===
- Category 4 hurricane (SSHWS)
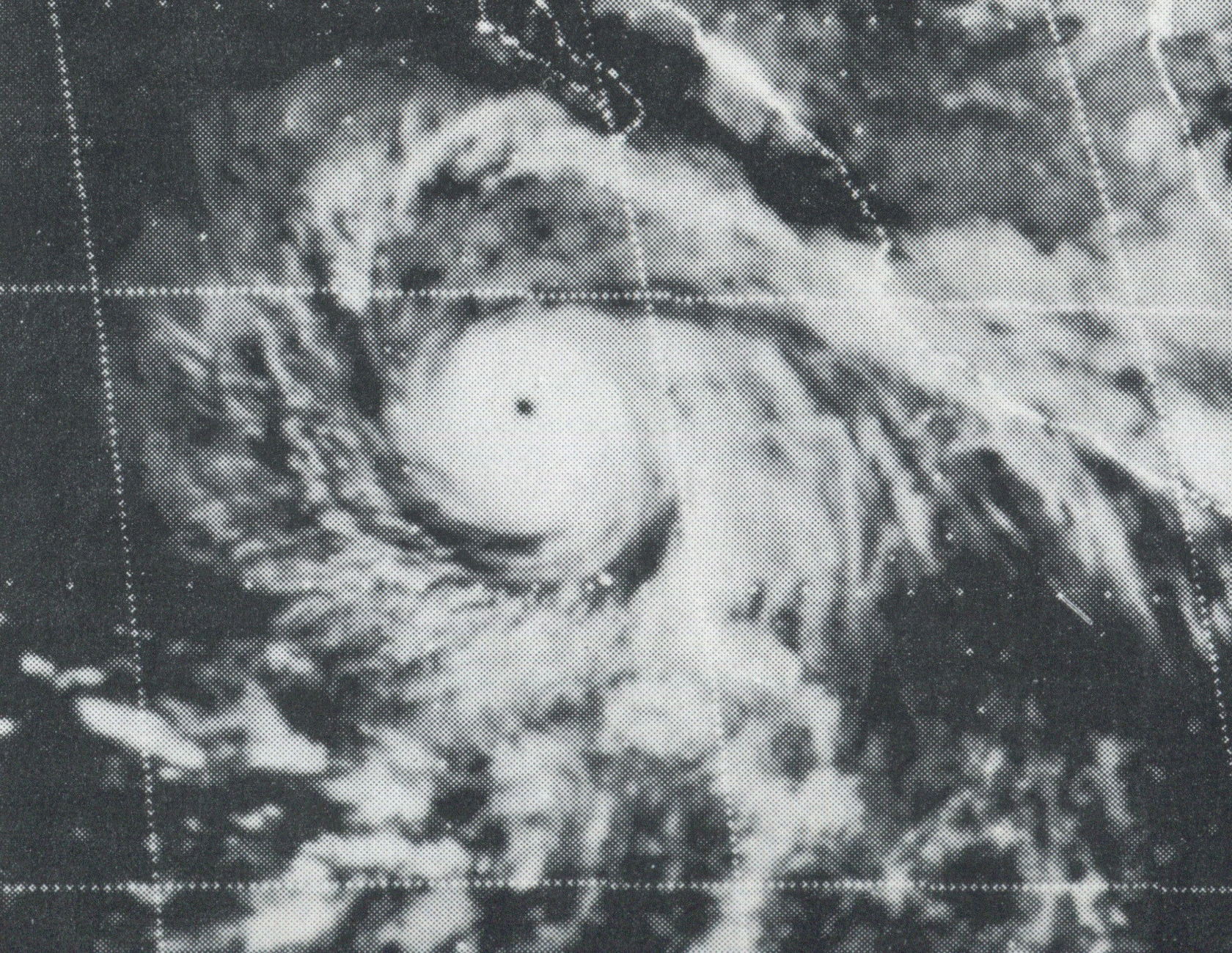
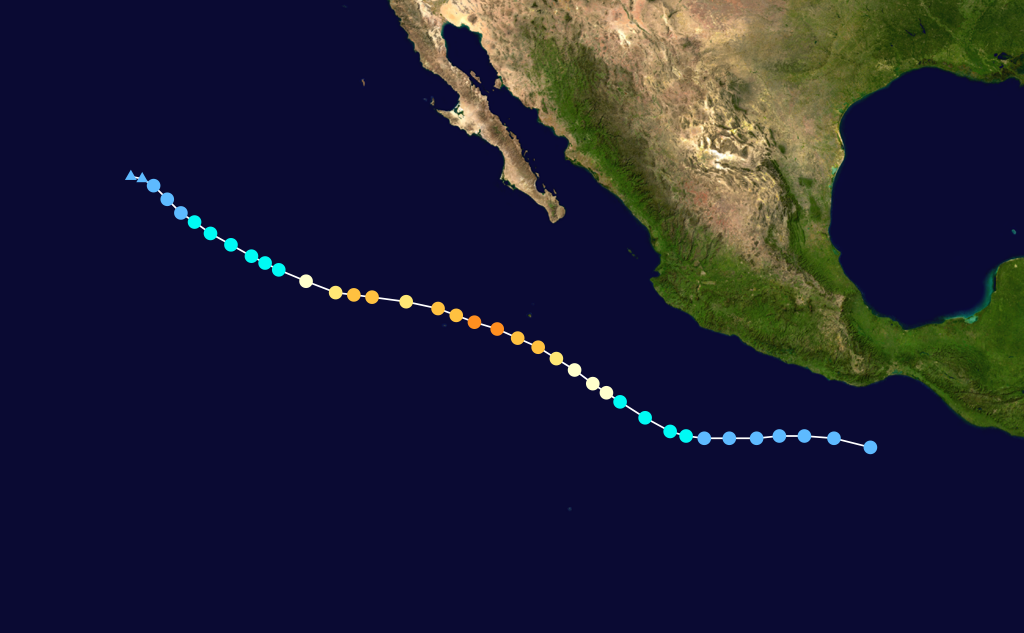
- Duration: August 24 – September 1
- Peak intensity: 130 mph (215 km/h) (1-min);

Late on August 23, an area of disturbed weather developed about 485 miles (781 km) south of Acapulco, Guerrero. It rapidly coalesced into a tropical depression around 00:00 UTC the next day, but only slowly strengthened into Tropical Storm Iva by 18:00 UTC on August 25. The system moved west and then west-northwest, further developing into a hurricane by 18:00 UTC on August 26 as a small eye became distinct. Iva attained major hurricane strength late on August 27, further intensifying to its peak as a Category 4 hurricane with winds of 130 mph (210 km/h) around 06:00 UTC the following morning. It oscillated in strength over the subsequent 24 hours, but ultimately began a steady weakening trend by August 30 while passing over marginal ocean temperatures. Iva fell to tropical storm strength early that day, weakened to a tropical depression early on September 1, and dissipated around 00:00 UTC on September 2.

=== Tropical Storm Joanne ===
- Tropical storm (SSHWS)
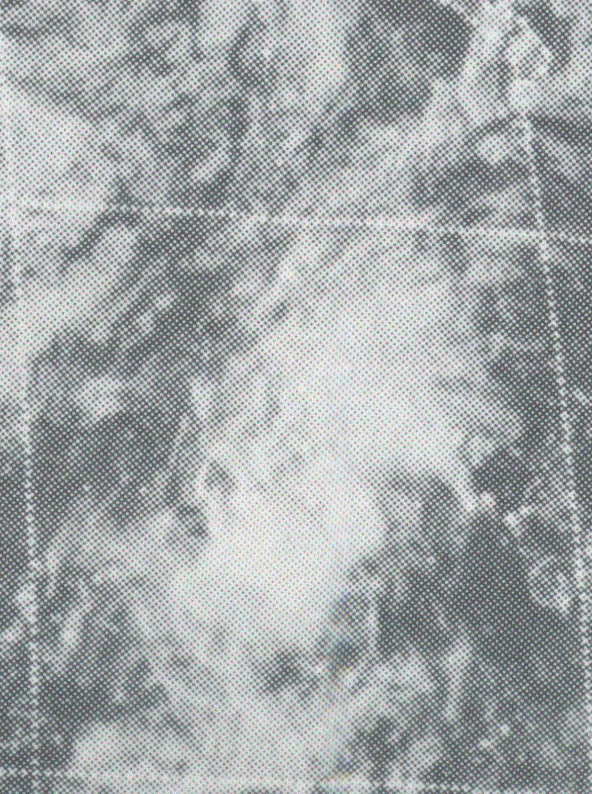
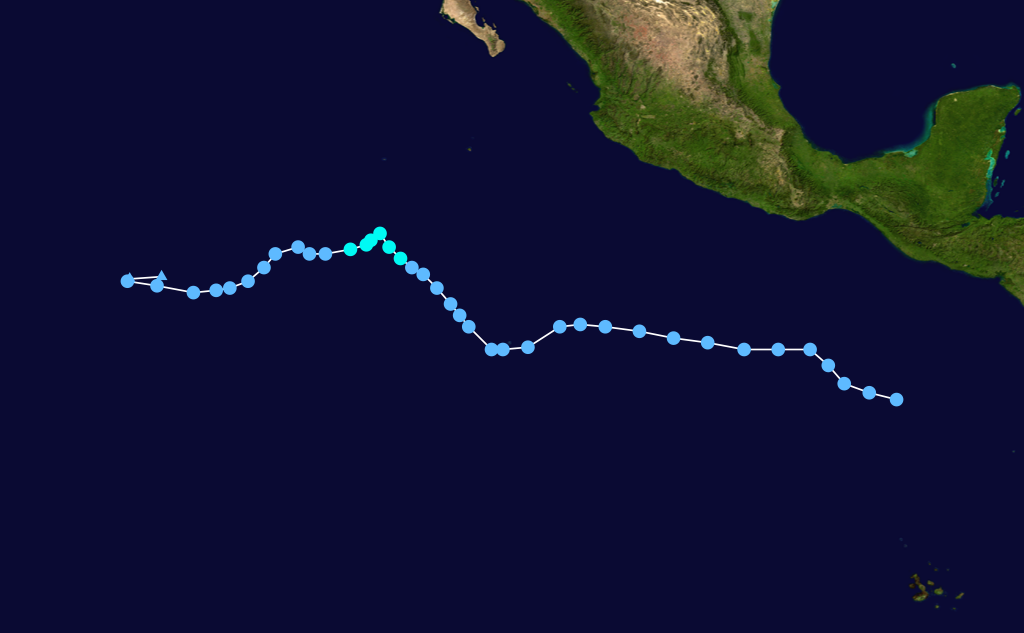
- Duration: August 29 – September 7
- Peak intensity: 50 mph (85 km/h) (1-min);

A tropical disturbance formed about 175 miles (282 km) west of the coastline of Colombia early on August 26. The large system moved steadily west, developing into a tropical depression by 00:00 UTC on August 29. Over the course of the next several days, the depression failed to intensify further as it moved erratically. Finally, by 12:00 UTC on September 3, the depression strengthened into Tropical Storm Joanne. After reaching peak winds of 50 mph (80 km/h), the storm moved generally west-southwest and weakened. It degraded to a tropical depression early on September 5 and maintained its status as a weak tropical cyclone until dissipating around 00:00 UTC on September 8.

=== Hurricane Kathleen ===
- Category 1 hurricane (SSHWS)
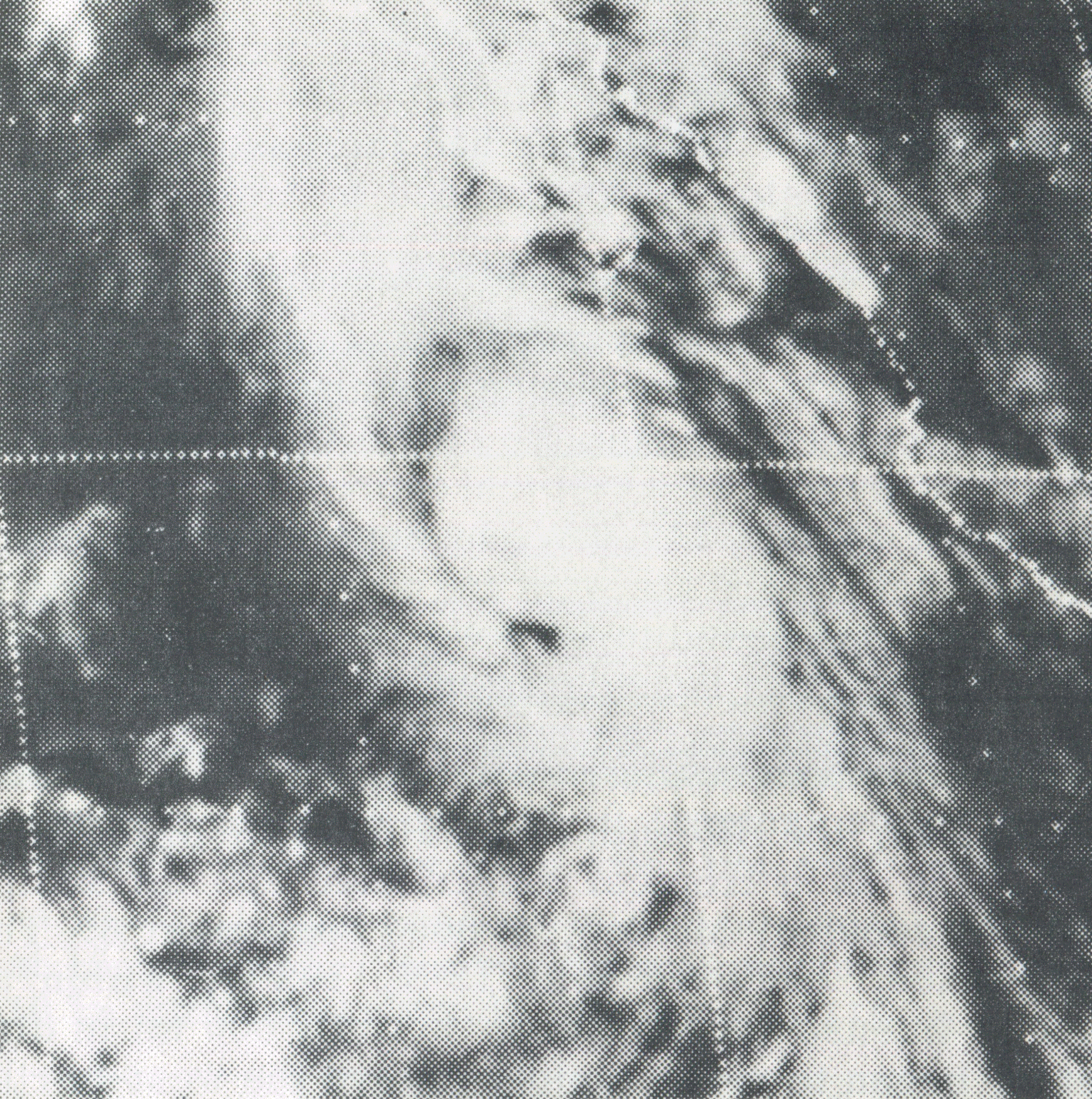
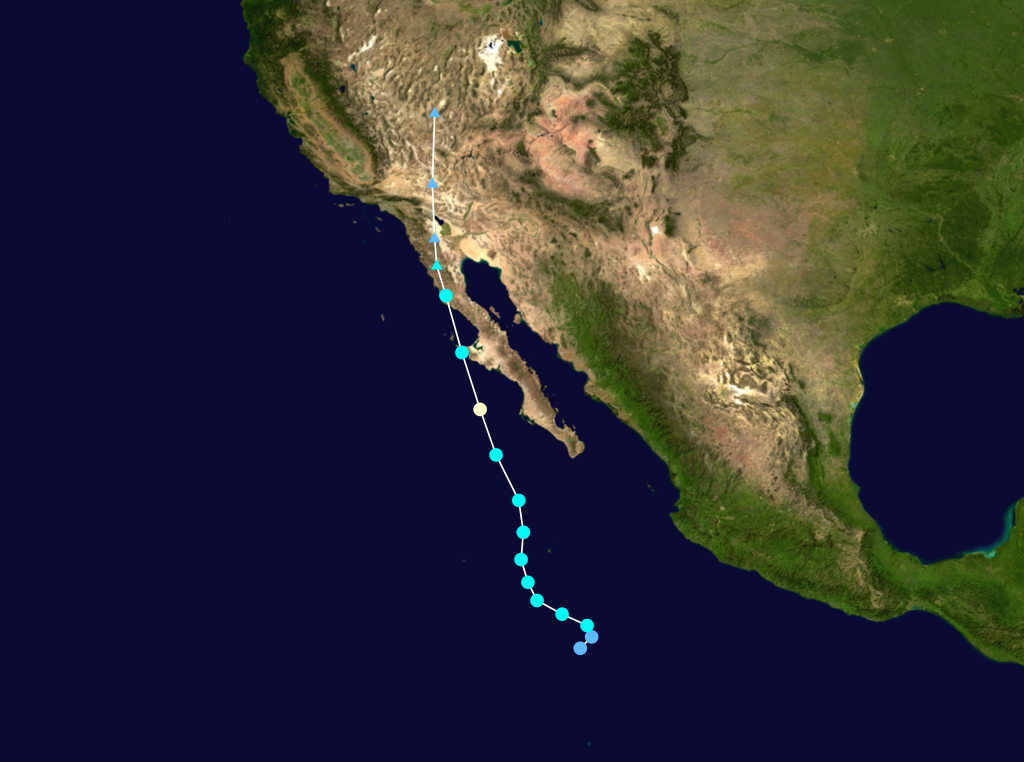
- Duration: September 7 – September 10
- Peak intensity: 80 mph (130 km/h) (1-min); 986 mbar (hPa)

Kathleen formed from an area of disturbed weather that was first identified roughly 345 miles (555 km) southwest of Acapulco, Guerrero, on September 6. The disturbance organized into a tropical depression around 12:00 UTC on September 7 and further intensified into Tropical Storm Kathleen twelve hours later as it began to move northwestward. Despite fluctuations in strength over the next day, Kathleen intensified into a Category 1 hurricane around 00:00 UTC on September 10, when a reconnaissance aircraft measured peak winds of 80 mph (130 km/h). An accelerating forward motion brought the cyclone over Point Eugenia as a moderate tropical storm early on September 10. It continued onshore about 160 miles (260 km) south of Ensenada, Baja California, ultimately losing its status as a tropical cyclone by 18:00 UTC. The remnants of the storm continued north across Arizona and Nevada on September 11.

=== Hurricane Kate ===
- Category 2 hurricane (SSHWS)
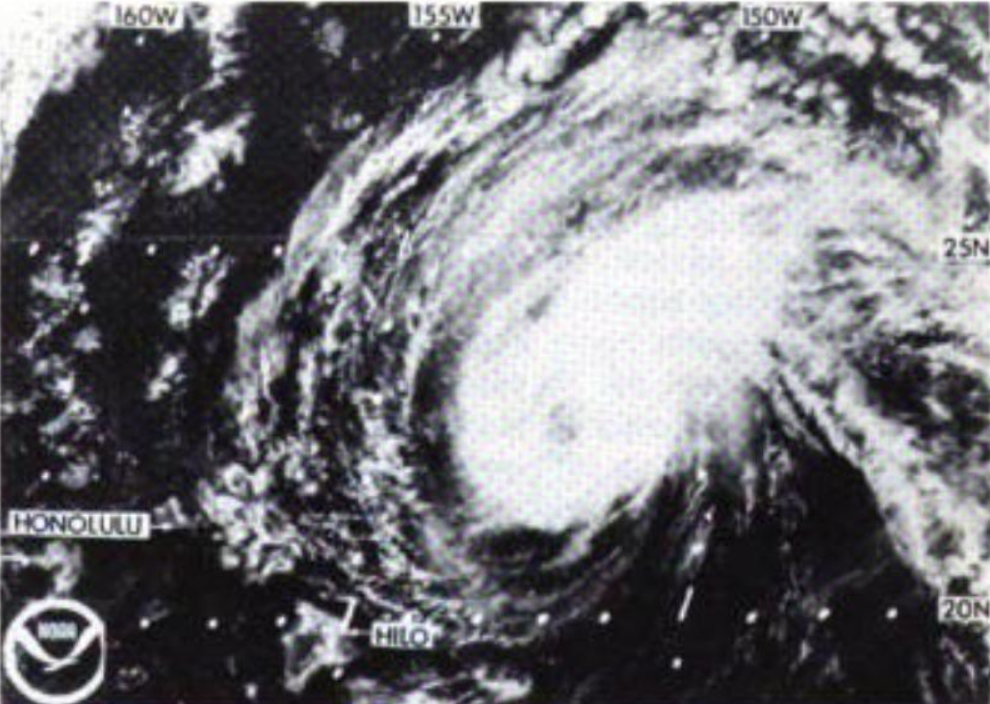
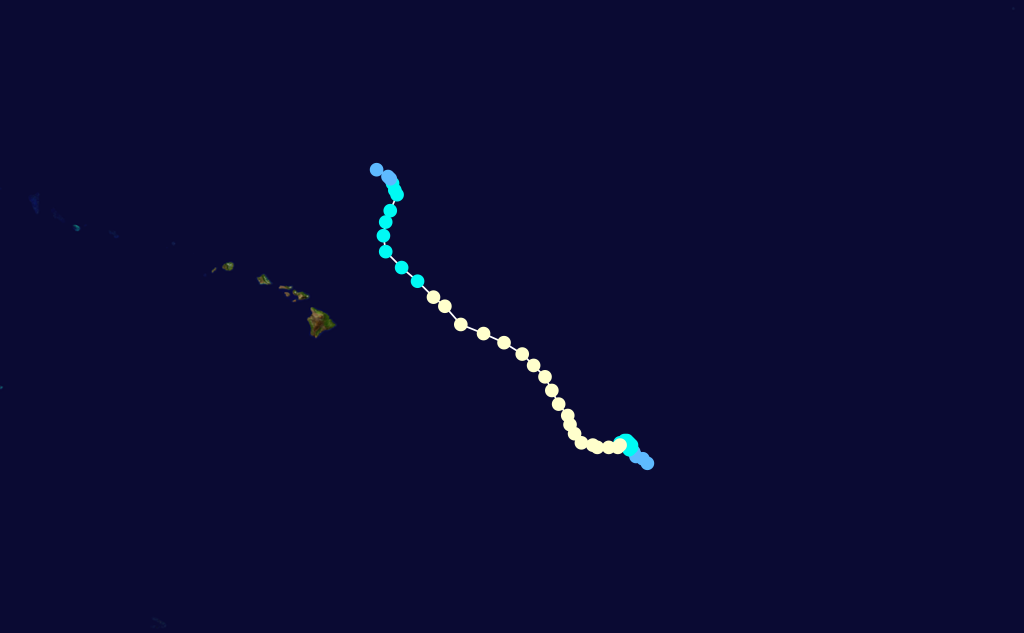
- Duration: September 21 – October 2
- Peak intensity: 100 mph (155 km/h) (1-min); 971 mbar (hPa)

The only hurricane to form in the central Pacific arose from a disturbance that drifted in from the east. Tropical Depression Twenty-two formed on September 22. The depression became Tropical Storm Kate the next day. Kate headed almost due northwest. Early on September 24, the storm became a hurricane. This prompted a hurricane watch being issued for the Big Island on September 28. The watch continued until Kate was downgraded to a storm on September 29. It passed 200 miles northwest of the island and was destroyed by wind shear on October 2.

There was only minor damage reported to the northern and eastern shores of Oahu, Maui, and Hawaii due to heavy surf. A ship called the Hawaiian Princess was caught by gales caused by Kate but escaped.

=== Hurricane Liza ===
- Category 4 hurricane (SSHWS)
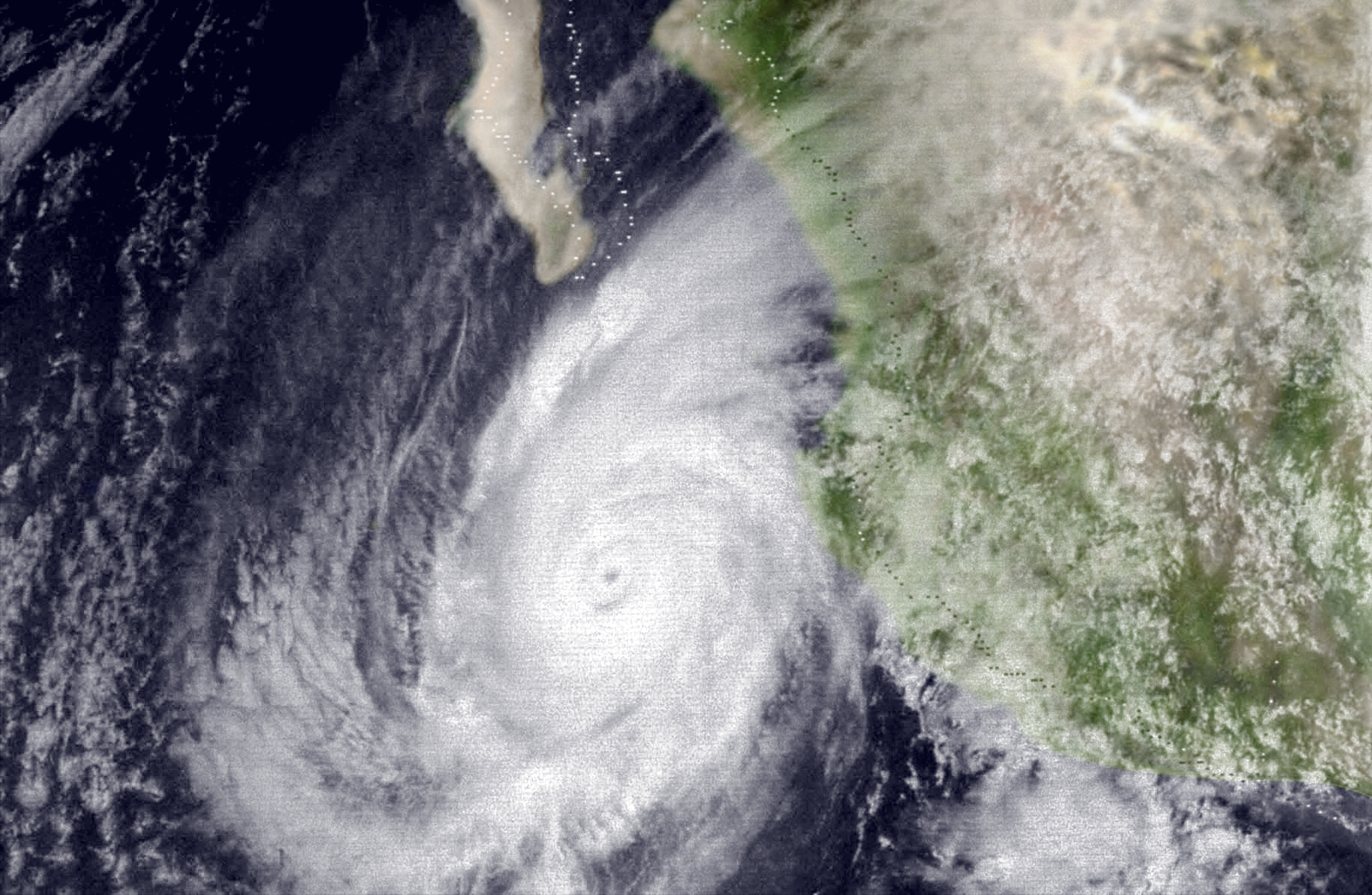
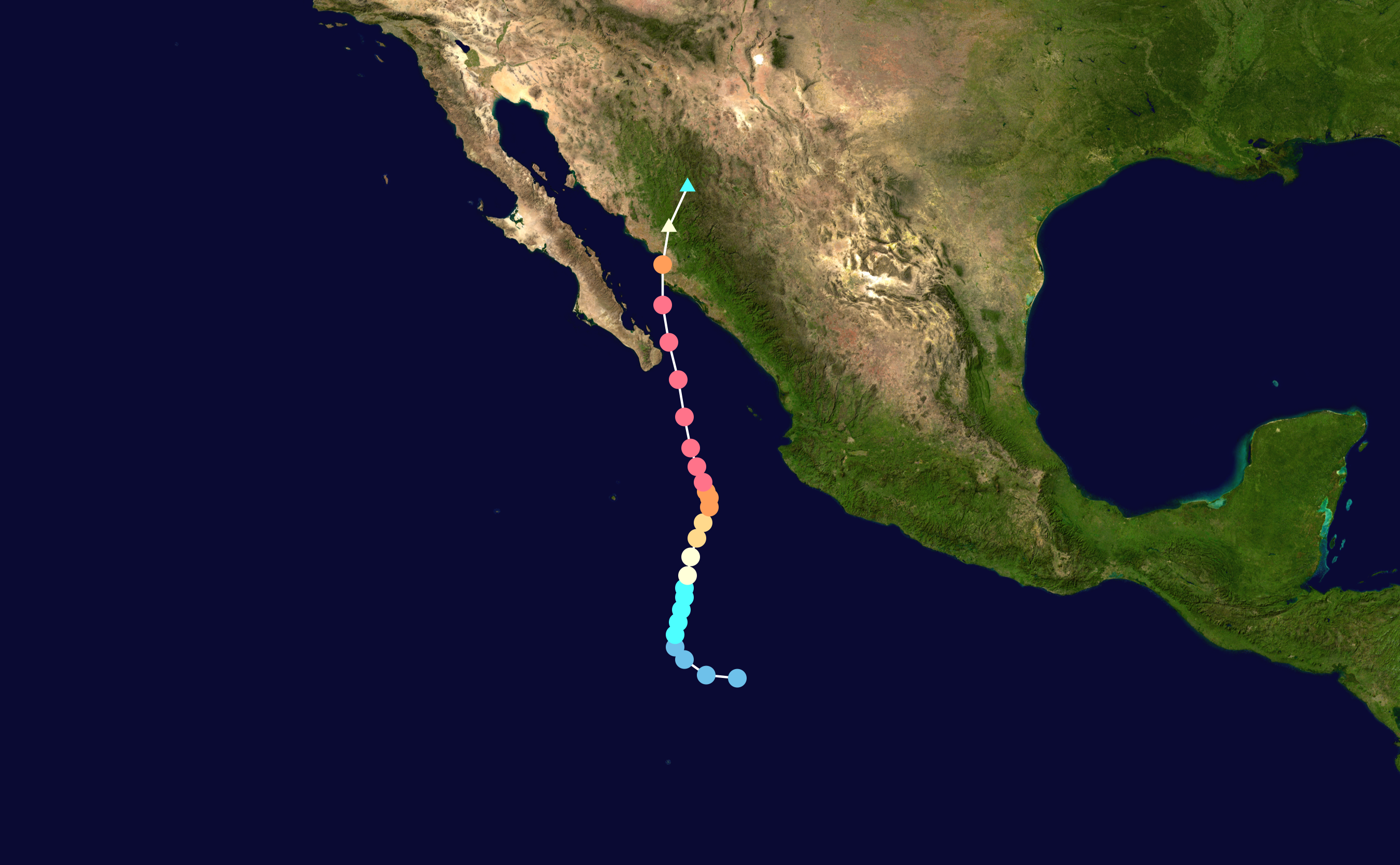
- Duration: September 25 – October 1
- Peak intensity: 140 mph (220 km/h) (1-min); 948 mbar (hPa)

The deadliest and most destructive hurricane of the 1976 season originated as a large tropical disturbance about 525 miles (845 km) southwest of Acapulco, Guerrero, on September 25. It developed into a tropical depression around 18:00 UTC that day and steadily strengthened into Tropical Storm Liza 24 hours later. The incipient cyclone turned toward the north while continuing over warm waters, and it attained hurricane strength by 00:00 UTC on September 28. Liza intensified into a major hurricane on September 29, and a reconnaissance aircraft measured peak winds of 140 mph (230 km/h) around 18:00 UTC, when the storm was in the midst of an eyewall replacement cycle. Liza maintained Category 4 intensity until early on October 1 when it moved ashore the coastline of Mexico north of Los Mochis, Sinaloa, as a slighter weaker Category 3 cyclone. Liza rapidly weakened over the mountainous terrain and was last tracked as a tropical cyclone at 12:00 UTC on October 1.

=== Hurricane Madeline ===
- Category 4 hurricane (SSHWS)
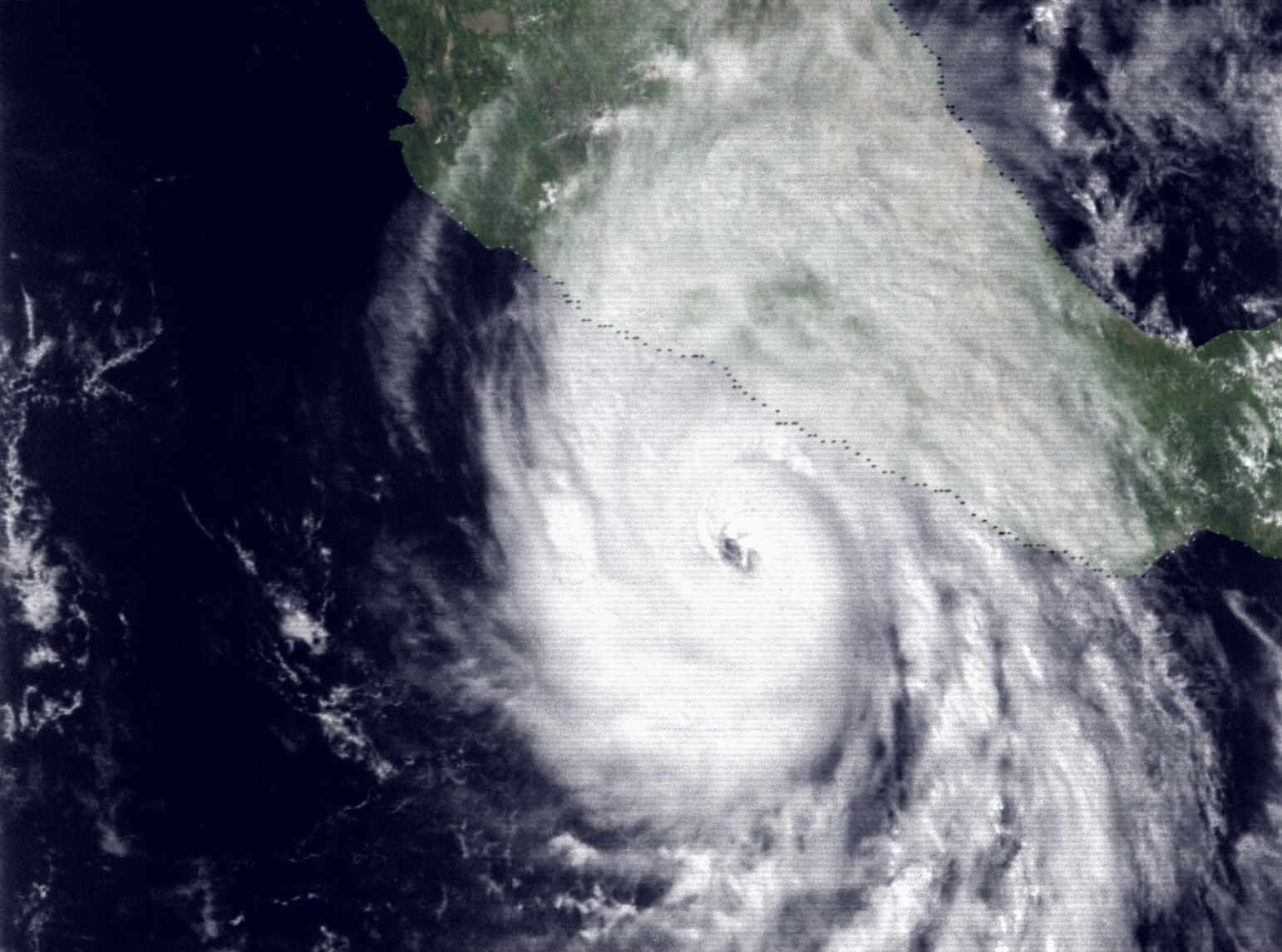
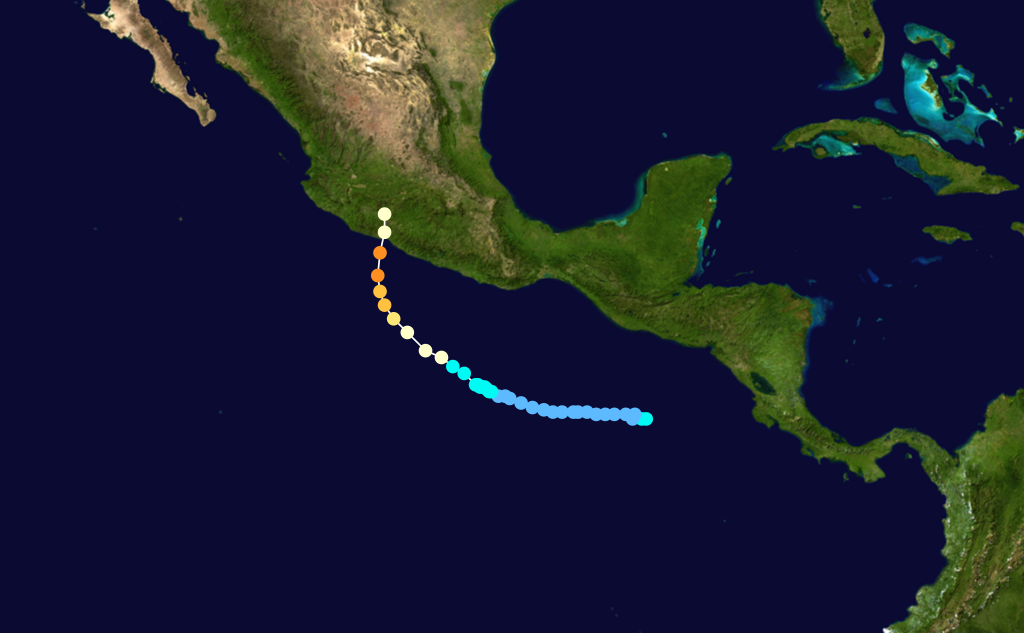
- Duration: September 29 – October 8
- Peak intensity: 145 mph (230 km/h) (1-min); 940 mbar (hPa)

A tropical disturbance was first noted about 345 miles (555 km) south of the Guatemalan coastline on September 27. It organized into Tropical Storm Madeline by 00:00 UTC on September 29 but failed to further develop, instead weakening to a tropical depression the next morning. By 00:00 UTC on October 4, Madeline re-intensified into a tropical storm, beginning a gradual curve toward the north as well. The system continued to strengthen and became a hurricane early on October 6; by 06:00 UTC on October 8, Madline peaked as a Category 4 hurricane with winds of 145 mph (233 km/h). It moved onshore the coastline of Mexico a few hours later, rapidly weakening and losing its status as a tropical cyclone after 18:00 UTC that day.

=== Tropical Storm Naomi ===
- Tropical storm (SSHWS)
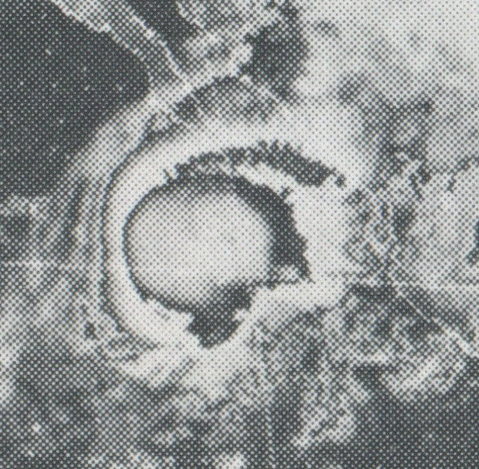
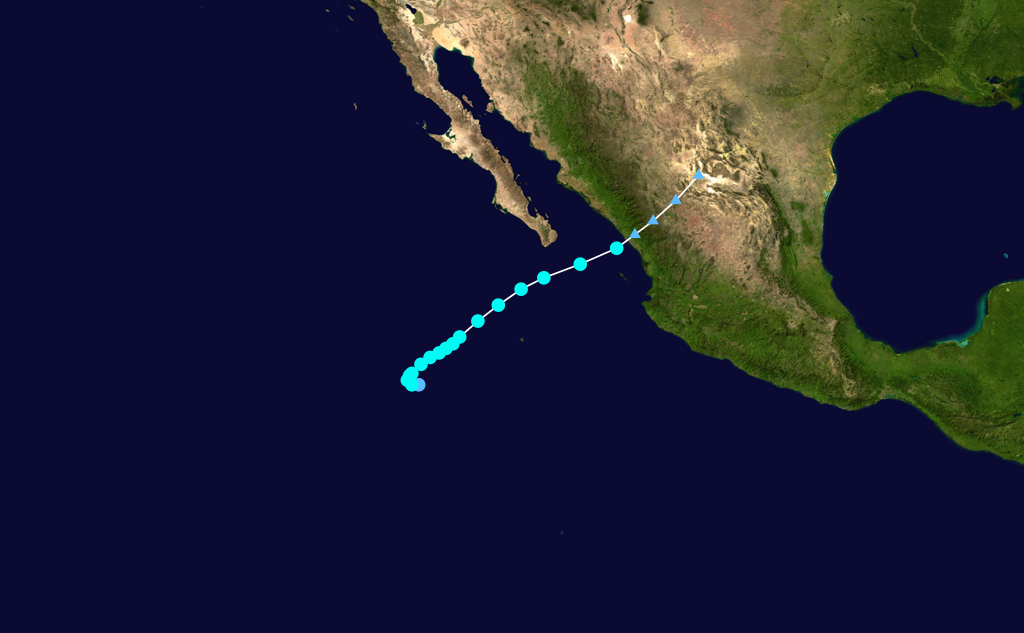
- Duration: October 25 – October 29
- Peak intensity: 50 mph (85 km/h) (1-min); ≤1005 mbar (hPa)

The last storm of the season began as a tropical disturbance roughly 920 miles (1,480 km) south-southwest of Mazatlán, Sinaloa, late on October 22. It originally moved west but later curved toward the north, developing into a tropical depression around 12:00 UTC on October 25, and further intensifying into Tropical Storm Naomi six hours later. By 18:00 UTC on October 27, Naomi had reached peak winds of 50 mph (80 km/h). In the presence of wind shear, the cyclone slowly weakened thereafter, moving ashore the coastline of Mexico near Mazatlán as a minimal tropical storm early on October 29. Naomi rapidly weakened once inland and was last tracked as a tropical cyclone around 12:00 UTC that day.

=== Other systems ===
There were four tropical depressions during the 1976 season. The first lasted from June 1–3 over the open eastern Pacific. The second existed from June 28–30, originating in the Gulf of Tehuantepec and making landfall near Salina Cruz, Oaxaca, before dissipating. The third occurred from August 7–8 in the far western reaches of the East pacific while the fourth and final depression was active from August 16–19 well southwest of Baja California.

== Storm names ==
The following list of names was used for named storms that formed in the North Pacific Ocean east of 140°W in 1976. It was the same list used for the 1972 season. No names were retired following the season; however, an overhaul of the naming system in 1978 to include male names resulted in this list being discarded.

- Annette
- Bonny
- Celeste
- Diana *
- Estelle
- Fernanda *
- Gwen *
- Hyacinth
- Iva
- Joanne
- Kathleen
- Liza
- Madeline
- Naomi
- Orla (unused)
- Pauline (unused)
- Rebecca (unused)
- Simone (unused)
- Tara (unused)
- Valerie (unused)
- Willa (unused)

One named storm, listed below, formed in the North Pacific between 140°W and the International Date Line in 1976. At the time, storm names within this region were assigned from the Pacific typhoon list by the Joint Typhoon Warning Center on Guam. Named storms in the table above that crossed into the area during the season are noted (*).

- Kate

== See also ==
- List of Pacific hurricanes
- Pacific hurricane season
- 1976 Atlantic hurricane season
- 1976 Pacific typhoon season
- 1976 North Indian Ocean cyclone season
- Australian cyclone seasons: 1975–76, 1976–77
- South Pacific cyclone seasons: 1975–76, 1976–77
- South-West Indian Ocean cyclone seasons: 1975–76, 1976–77
