= Anete Muižniece-Brice =

Latvian basketball player

Anete Muižniece-Brice born April 27, 1962, in Riga is a Latvian former basketball player.

== Career ==
Between the years of 1981 to 1990 she played for the TTT Riga Team and won the European Champion Cup Victory.
