= Annette =

Annette may refer to:

== Film and television ==
- Walt Disney Presents: Annette, 1950s television series
- Annette (film), a 2021 musical film

== Other ==
- Annette (given name), list of people with the name
- Annette Island, Alaska
- Tropical Storm Annette (disambiguation)
- 2839 Annette, an asteroid
- Annette (album), by Paul Bley
