= 1976 hurricane season =

1976 hurricane season may refer to:

- The 1976 Atlantic hurricane season
- The 1976 Pacific hurricane season
