= Tropical Storm Dottie =

Atlantic tropical storm in 1976

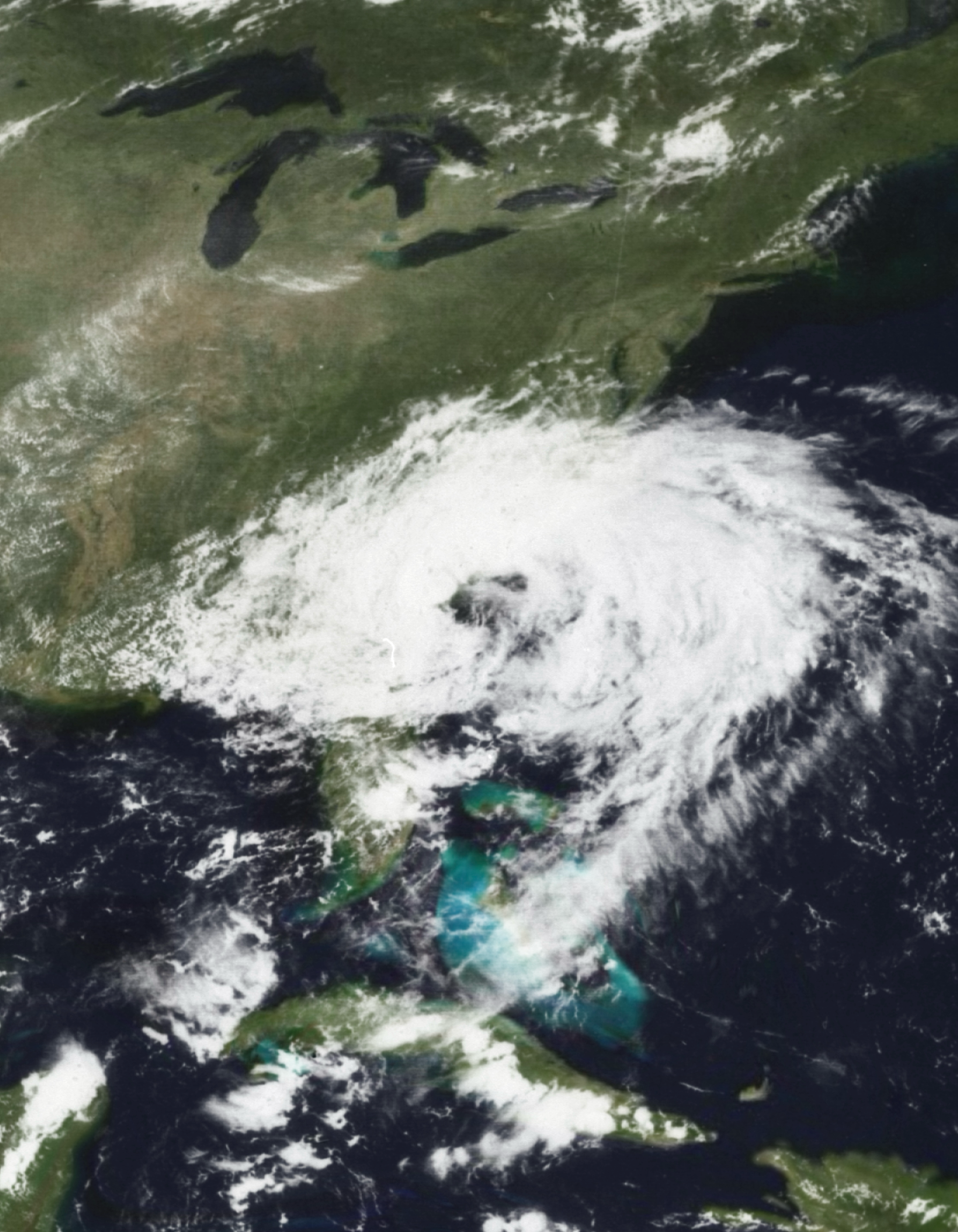
- Tropical Storm Dottie prior to its South Carolina landfall on August 20

Meteorological history
- Formed: August 18, 1976
- Dissipated: August 21, 1976

Tropical storm
- 1-minute sustained (SSHWS/NWS)
- Highest winds: 50 mph (85 km/h)
- Lowest pressure: 996 mbar (hPa); 29.41 inHg

Overall effects
- Fatalities: 4
- Damage: Southeast United States, Bahamas
- IBTrACS
- Part of the 1976 Atlantic hurricane season

Tropical Storm Dottie was the ninth tropical cyclone and fourth named storm of the 1976 Atlantic hurricane season. The precursor to Dottie formed in the Gulf of Mexico on August 17 and organized into a tropical depression on August 18. The storm drifted towards the east, and, after peaking as a moderate tropical storm, it accelerated northeastward and made landfall on Florida. Upon re-emerging in the Atlantic, Dottie turned northward and moved ashore near Charleston, South Carolina. Damage from the storm was primarily insignificant and limited to gusty winds, heavy rainfall, and high tides. A fishing boat capsized in the Bahamas, resulting in the deaths of four people.

== Meteorological history ==
Map plotting the storm's track and intensity, according to the Saffir–Simpson scale Map key Saffir–Simpson scale Tropical depression (≤38 mph, ≤62 km/h) Tropical storm (39–73 mph, 63–118 km/h) Category 1 (74–95 mph, 119–153 km/h) Category 2 (96–110 mph, 154–177 km/h) Category 3 (111–129 mph, 178–208 km/h) Category 4 (130–156 mph, 209–251 km/h) Category 5 (≥157 mph, ≥252 km/h) Unknown Storm type Tropical cyclone Subtropical cyclone Extratropical cyclone, remnant low, tropical disturbance, or monsoon depression

Dottie originated in an area of low pressure that formed on August 17, about 150 mi (240 km) northwest of Key West, Florida. The center of the disturbance soon began to consolidate while barometric pressure fell 8 mbar in 24 hours; it was declared a tropical depression at 00:00 UTC on August 18. The depression drifted east and northeastward over the next day, though it began to accelerate on August 19. The cyclone further intensified to tropical storm status by 12:00 UTC. Operationally, it was not named until later that day.

Having made landfall in southwestern Florida, Dottie quickly proceeded northeastward before re-emerging into the Atlantic Ocean. High pressure building to the north of the storm indicated it would turn more towards the west, but it moved nearly due northward. The cyclone attained its peak intensity with winds of 50 mph (85 km/h) at 06:00 UTC on August 20 and subsequently began to weaken; by the time Dottie made landfall in Charleston, South Carolina later that evening, it was barely of tropical storm intensity. It deteriorated into a tropical depression on August 21 and dissipated shortly thereafter. The remnant low pressure system turned southward and once again entered the Atlantic before turning westward and crossing the Florida peninsula.

== Preparations and impact ==
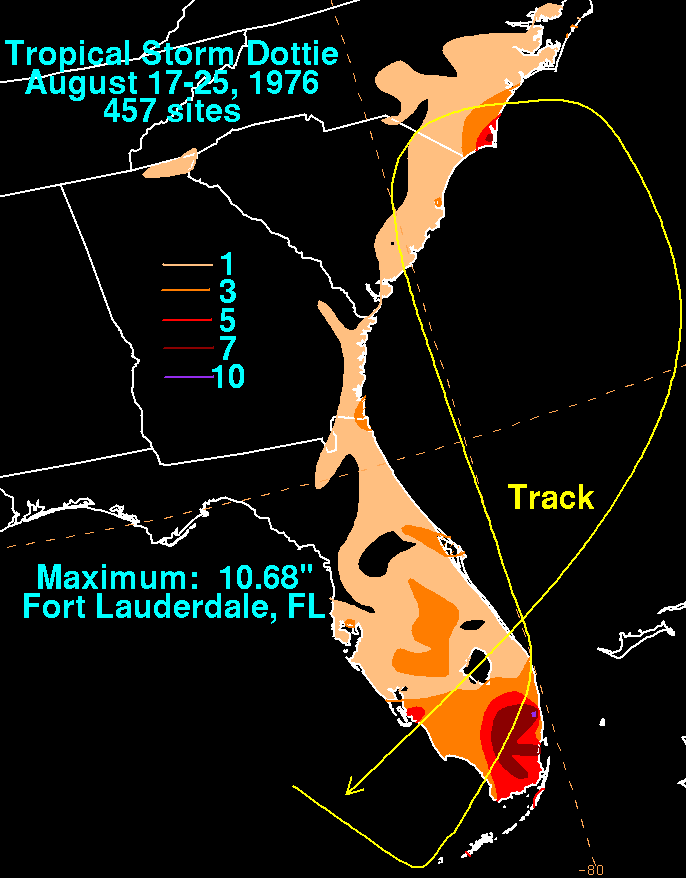
Rainfall totals from Tropical Storm Dottie

In response to the storm, gale warnings were issued from Jacksonville, Florida to Virginia Beach, Virginia, with hurricane watches from Savannah, Georgia to Cape Hatteras, North Carolina. Flooding rains were anticipated in the Carolinas, though, in contrast, Dottie was compared to a mere thunderstorm by some local officials.

Prior to being upgraded to a tropical storm, the depression spawned heavy precipitation and high winds throughout southern Florida and portions of the Bahamas. In Fort Lauderdale, the storm dropped 10.68 in (271 mm) of rainfall, and in the Miami area, 24-hour rainfall totals reached 8 in (200 mm). The heavy rainfall caused street flooding across the region, especially in the Broward County cities of Fort Lauderdale, Hollywood, Lauderhill, Miramar, and Tamarac. Further south, street flooding in Miami delayed thousands of motorists during morning rush-hour traffic. Police closed the Venetian Causeway – which links Miami to the Venetian Islands and Miami Beach – after the bridge was inundated with 2.5 ft (0.76 m) of water. The highest recorded wind gusts were 62 mph (100 km/h) in Islamorada, and in the city the winds damaged a roof. The winds downed trees, and left roughly 20 neighborhoods in southern Florida without power during the passage of Dottie. Wind gusts of 40 to 50 mph (64 to 80 km/h) were recorded across the northern Florida Keys and Grand Bahama. Near the latter location, a fishing boat capsized during the storm; four of its occupants drowned.

Along the coast of the Southeastern United States, tides generally ran 1 to 2 ft (0.30 to 0.61 m) above normal, peaking at 3.5 ft (1.1 m) in North Carolina. Moderate to heavy rainfall was reported in the Carolinas, causing flooding of 5 ft (1.5 m) deep in New Hanover County, North Carolina. Overall damage was light and primarily limited to coastal beach erosion. In some areas, Dottie helped relieve drought conditions.
