= Hurricane Belle =

Category 3 Atlantic hurricane in 1976

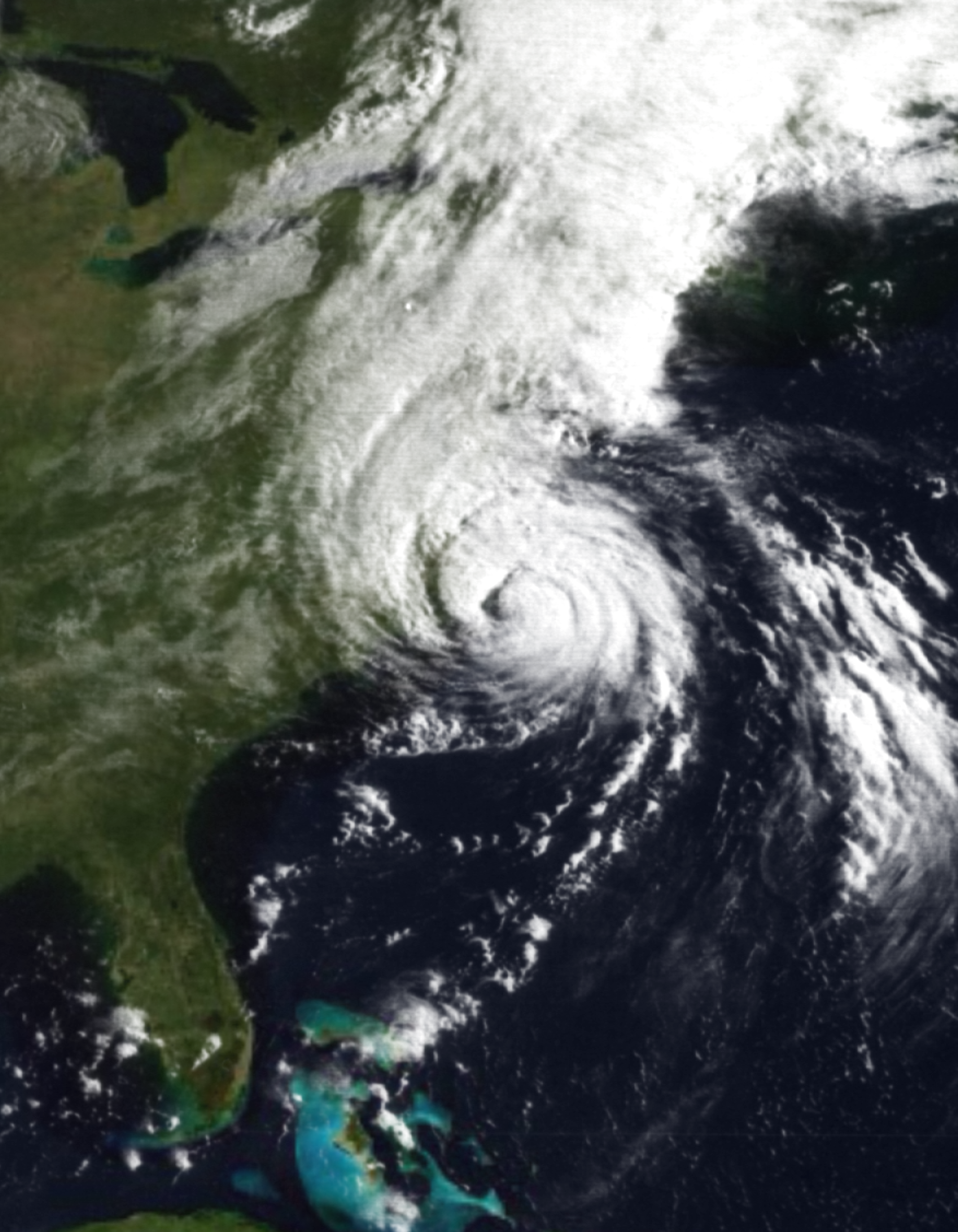
- Belle shortly after peak intensity on August 9

Meteorological history
- Formed: August 6, 1976
- Extratropical: August 10, 1976
- Dissipated: August 15, 1976

Category 3 major hurricane
- 1-minute sustained (SSHWS/NWS)
- Highest winds: 120 mph (195 km/h)
- Lowest pressure: 957 mbar (hPa); 28.26 inHg

Overall effects
- Fatalities: 12
- Damage: $100 million (1976 USD)
- Areas affected: North Carolina, Mid-Atlantic states, New England, and Atlantic Canada
- IBTrACS
- Part of the 1976 Atlantic hurricane season

Hurricane Belle was a strong tropical cyclone that caused moderate damage across the East Coast of the United States in August 1976. In late July, a tropical wave emerged off the west coast of Africa. Traversing the Atlantic Ocean for more than a week, the system eventually consolidated into a tropical depression near the Bahamas on August 6. Remaining nearly stationary for a day, the depression strengthened into a tropical storm on August 7 and a hurricane later that day as it acquired a northwest motion. Formation of an eye accompanied quick intensification and Belle reached its peak the following day with winds of 120 mph (190 km/h). The hurricane subsequently turned north and accelerated, skirting the Outer Banks of North Carolina. Early on August 10, Belle made landfall on Long Island, New York, as a minimal hurricane crossing Long Island Sound and hitting the central coast of Connecticut as a strong tropical storm. Thereafter, Belle transitioned into an extratropical cyclone over New England before moving over Atlantic Canada. The system turned east while over the North Atlantic and ultimately dissipated on August 15 to the south of Iceland.

Threatening much of the East Coast of the United States, hurricane warnings were issued from Georgia to Maine. An estimated 500,000 people evacuated coastal areas accordingly. Overall, impacts from Belle were less than expected and mainly attributed to flooding across New England. Hundreds of thousands of residents lost power due to high winds. A total of 12 people lost their lives, mostly incidents indirectly related to the hurricane, and damage reached an estimated $100 million. (Note: All monetary values are in 1976 United States dollars unless otherwise noted.) Portions of New Jersey, New York, and Vermont were later declared major disaster areas by then-President Gerald Ford. Some damage also took place in New Brunswick, Canada, from heavy rain.

== Meteorological history ==
Map plotting the storm's track and intensity, according to the Saffir–Simpson scale Map key Saffir–Simpson scale Tropical depression (≤38 mph, ≤62 km/h) Tropical storm (39–73 mph, 63–118 km/h) Category 1 (74–95 mph, 119–153 km/h) Category 2 (96–110 mph, 154–177 km/h) Category 3 (111–129 mph, 178–208 km/h) Category 4 (130–156 mph, 209–251 km/h) Category 5 (≥157 mph, ≥252 km/h) Unknown Storm type Tropical cyclone Subtropical cyclone Extratropical cyclone, remnant low, tropical disturbance, or monsoon depression

On July 28, 1976, a tropical wave emerged off the west coast of Africa. An unusually well-organized system for the time of year and location, considerable deep convection accompanied it. A possible low-level circulation consolidated within the system by July 31 as it raced west across the Atlantic Ocean. As it approached the Lesser Antilles in early August, convection separated from the system and moved north of the islands while the wave itself continued into the Caribbean. The northern portion of the system eventually reached a point north of the Bahamas on August 5 and grew increasingly organized. Well-defined upper-level outflow became established that evening. A low-level center formed early on August 6 and became a tropical depression by 06:00 UTC while situated roughly 290 mi (470 km) east-northeast of Nassau, Bahamas. Over the next 24 hours, the system remained almost stationary and executed a small counter-clockwise loop. Early on August 7, the depression acquired gale-force winds and became a tropical storm. Accordingly, it was assigned the name Belle. Acquiring a slow northwest trajectory, Belle steadily intensified on August 7. Reconnaissance aircraft investigating the storm revealed the system to have achieved hurricane strength by 18:00 UTC as its pressure fell to 985 mbar (hPa; 29.09 inHg). Additionally, a well-defined eye was present by this time.

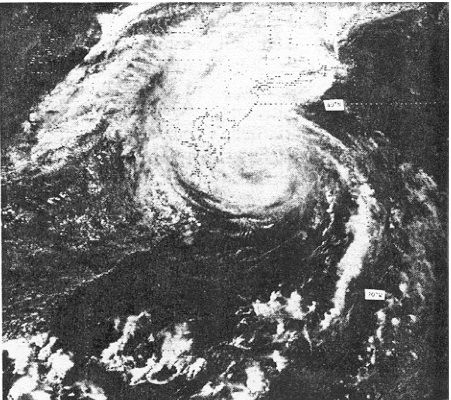
Hurricane Belle off the coast of Delaware and Maryland, approaching landfall in New York, on August 9

The cyclone turned northward and accelerated on August 8 while reaching major hurricane status that evening. Early on August 9, Belle achieved its peak intensity with maximum estimated surface winds of 120 mph (190 km/h) and a minimum pressure of 957 mbar (957 hPa; 28.3 inHg). At higher altitudes within the storm, recon reported winds up to 150 mph (240 km/h). Turning to just east of due north, Belle began weakening shortly thereafter with its eye becoming obscured. Late on August 9, the hurricane passed within 60 mi (97 km) of Hatteras Island, North Carolina. Contrary to most storms which threaten the northeastern states, Belle did not accelerate tremendously as it neared land. Accordingly, it weakened quickly in response to cooler waters in the region. Around 05:00 UTC on August 10, Belle made landfall as a minimal hurricane with 75 mph (121 km/h) winds along Jones Beach, Long Island, New York. Briefly crossing Long Island Sound, Belle made a second landfall as a strong tropical storm near Bridgeport, Connecticut. Once inland over New England, the system transitioned into an extratropical cyclone while traversing New Hampshire. The remnants accelerated northeast and later due east across Atlantic Canada before emerging over the Labrador Sea on August 12. While situated between the Azores and Greenland, ex-Belle turned north-northeast and ultimately dissipated south of Iceland on August 15.

== Preparations ==
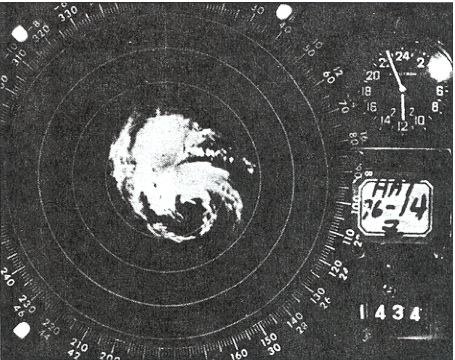
Radar image of Hurricane Belle off the coast of North Carolina on August 9

Owing to Hurricane Belle's proximity to many states along the Eastern Seaboard, hurricane watches and warnings were issued for the entire coast from Georgia to Maine. Accordingly, evacuations took place in numerous states with an estimated 500,000 people evacuating overall.

Officials advised residents near the coastline to evacuate to safer areas further inland. Approximately 40,000 vacationing in the Outer Banks evacuated; however, roughly 2,500 residents decided to ride out the storm in their homes. In Kitty Hawk and Nags Head, volunteer firefighters traveled door-to-door urging residents to leave. Schools and hotels across the areas were utilized as shelters for tourists. National Parks across the Outer Banks closed for the duration of the storm. Aircraft at the Marine Corps Camp Lejeune were relocated inland and helicopters were moved to hangars; some helicopters remained available for emergency rescue operations. An estimated 6,200 residents evacuated to Red Cross shelters in the state.

The majority of evacuations in the country were in New Jersey, with 250,000 residents and tourists relocating. Of this total, 65,000 were from Long Beach Island and 12,000 on the Barnegat Peninsula. With Hurricane Belle expected to make landfall around high tide and a full moon, the forecast storm tide was expected to rival that of Hurricane Donna in 1960. This placed roughly 500,000 people in danger and officials in New York immediately began preparations. Police officers handed out sandbags to residents in low-lying areas and National Guard armories and some public schools were used as evacuation centers. Approximately 30,000 evacuated in New York City and Suffolk County, 11,000 of whom utilized the aforementioned shelters. In Staten Island, 225 patients in a local hospital were relocated to a second facility. A flood watch was issued for the Hudson Valley in southern New York ahead of the hurricane on August 8. Advisories from the National Hurricane Center emphasized the flood risk as well. Numerous flights in and out of New York were cancelled, Wall Street was closed, and the United Nations postponed a meeting. A preseason football game between the New York Giants and the New York Jets, set to take place that night at Yankee Stadium, was cancelled. Summer tourists evacuated from most beaches but many residents decided to stay. In Connecticut, 52 helicopters and 100 pilots from the National Guard were placed on standby for possible relief missions following the storm.

Farther north in Rhode Island, 10,000 people fled from the coast. Despite evacuation orders, nearly half of the residents in Narragansett, Rhode Island, refused to leave their homes and as a result martial law was implemented to get people to leave. The Red Cross reported that about 2,300 people evacuated Cape Cod, Massachusetts, and thousands of tourists left the area. About 70 flights to and from Boston's Logan International Airport were canceled. Flood warnings were raised across western portions of the state.

== Impact ==
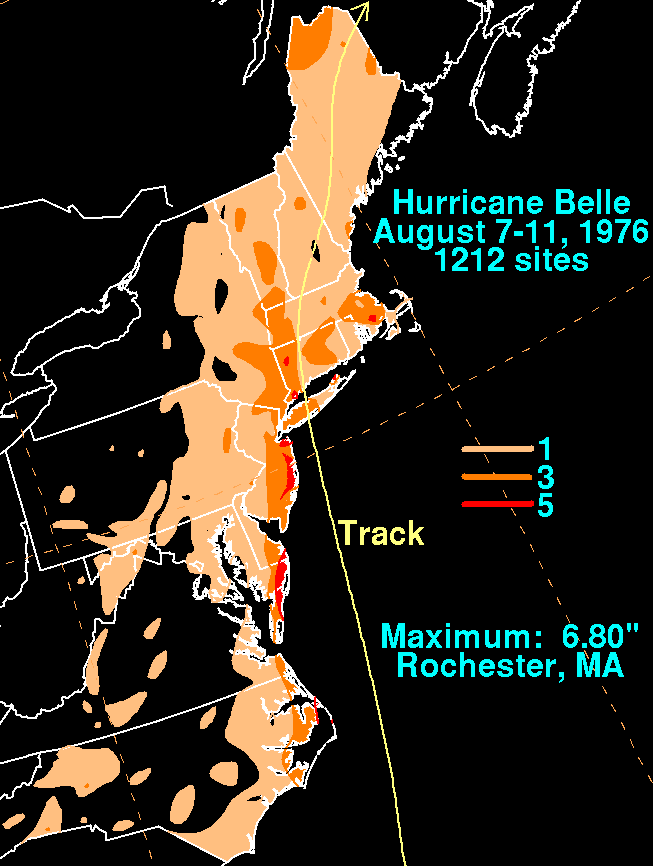
Rainfall accumulations from Hurricane Belle across the Eastern United States

Across the Eastern United States, the effects of Belle were less than anticipated. A total of 12 people lost their lives, mostly due to traffic accidents, and damage amounted to $100 million.

Hurricane Belle produced a swath of light to moderate, and locally heavy, rain extending from North Carolina into New England. The highest totals were confined to areas closer to the storm's center, with accumulations of 3 to 5 in (76 to 127 mm) common along its track. Notable state maximums included 6.8 in (170 mm) in Massachusetts, 6.68 in (170 mm) in Maryland, 5.85 in (149 mm) in Maine, 5.77 in (147 mm) in New York, 5.66 in (144 mm) in New Jersey, 5.37 in (136 mm) in Connecticut, and 5.3 in (130 mm) in Virginia. Although on the weaker side of the storm, New Jersey saw the highest winds from Belle, with an estimated peak gust of 90 mph (140 km/h) in Ship Bottom. A similar gust was estimated to have occurred in Jones Beach, New York, where Belle made landfall. Hurricane-force gusts also affected portions of Connecticut, New York, and North Carolina. LaGuardia Airport, near New York City, saw sustained winds of 52 mph (84 km/h) with gusts to 63 mph (101 km/h), while Bridgeport, Connecticut has gusts to 77 mph. Tides of 3–4 ft (0.91–1.22 m) above normal were common from North Carolina to Rhode Island. Atlantic City, New Jersey saw the greatest tides at 8.85 ft (2.70 m) above mean low-tide, while Battery Park in lower Manhattan saw a peak value of 7.2 ft (2.2 m) above mean low tide.

North Carolina escaped relatively unscathed from the hurricane, with only a few reports of wind damage in the Outer Banks. Windows at a hotel in Nags Head were blown out. Along the North Carolina–Virginia border, five people lost their lives in a car accident on a rain-slicked highway. Minor damage took place in Maryland. Although on the weaker side of the storm, gusty winds knocked down numerous power lines in New Jersey, leaving 10,000 people in the dark and setting off 75 fire alarms, one of which was a relatively large fire forcing the evacuation of a nursing home. Roughly 500 ft (150 m) of the Atlantic City boardwalk was damaged or destroyed, with repairs estimated to reach $5 million. Damage to properties in Monmouth and Ocean counties amounted to $3.6 million and $1 million, respectively. On August 21, then-President Gerald Ford issued a major disaster declaration for Atlantic, Cape May, Monmouth, and Ocean counties, allowing them to receive federal funding.

The high winds knocked down trees and power lines across Long Island, New York, leaving roughly 170,000 residents without electricity. Power crews from Pennsylvania were called in to assist in restoring electricity. Damage across the island reached $8 million, of which $3 million stemmed from erosion at Rockaway Beach. One person was killed in New York when a branch snapped off a tree due to high winds and fell on her. An estimated 36,000 residents in the lower Hudson Valley lost power. President Ford later declared Nassau, Suffolk, and Rensselaer counties major disaster areas. Effects were similar in Connecticut where approximately 247,000 people lost electricity. Commuter train service along Conrail's New York–New Haven line was canceled due to power outages, and Amtrak service between Boston and New York was disrupted for two days. A portion of the Merritt Parkway was closed due to downed trees. High winds in Bridgeport toppled many trees and power lines, shattered windows, and sparked two house fires. Five boats in the city's harbor sustained damage. Flooding in and around Danbury prompted evacuations of an apartment complex and motel. One fatality took place in Barkhamsted due to slippery roads. Overall damage in Connecticut was far less than expected, according to state police, with losses reaching $7.1 million and mostly stemming from Fairfield and New Haven counties. Power companies brought in additional personnel to expedite the restoration process, though many remained in the dark days after the storm. A couple and their two dogs in Vernon died from carbon monoxide poisoning from a generator on August 14.

Owing to heavy rains that preceded the hurricane, widespread small stream flooding took place in New England, particularly in Vermont where then-governor Thomas P. Salmon declared a state of emergency. Flooding in the state was reported as the worst in 30 years, with southern areas of the state seeing the greatest damage. Hardest hit was the town of Chester where 35 of its 85 roads flooded and 5 bridges were washed out. Otter Creek crested at 5 ft (1.5 m) above flood stage. Significant damage also took place in Jamaica, Ludlow, and Londonderry. Two people died in Huntington after the footbridge they were crossing collapsed into the Huntington River. Portions of Route 100 were washed out. Property damage in the state reached $5–10 million. The overall scale of flooding was regarded as a 1-in-10 to 1-in-25 year event. Immediately following the hurricane, a statewide ban on drinking water was imposed with an order to boil it first. This was later lifted on August 23. Salt accumulation along power lines in Rhode Island cut electricity to 8,000 residents on Aquidneck Island. Along the Saint John River in Aroostook County, Maine, flooding caused $2.5 million worth of damage to crops and buildings.

Heavy rains across New Brunswick, Canada, amounting to 7 in (180 mm) in Edundston, triggered flooding that damaged crops, homes, and roads. Losses from the event were estimated to be at least $1 million.

== See also ==
- List of New England hurricanes
  - Hurricane Bob (1991) – the most recent hurricane to strike New England
  - Hurricane Gloria (1985)
- List of New York hurricanes
  - Hurricane Irene (2011) – The most recent tropical cyclone to make landfall in New York state
  - Hurricane Sandy (2012) – affected similar U.S. states as Belle, and was also a Category 3 hurricane
- List of North Carolina hurricanes (1950–1979)
