= 1976 North Indian Ocean cyclone season =

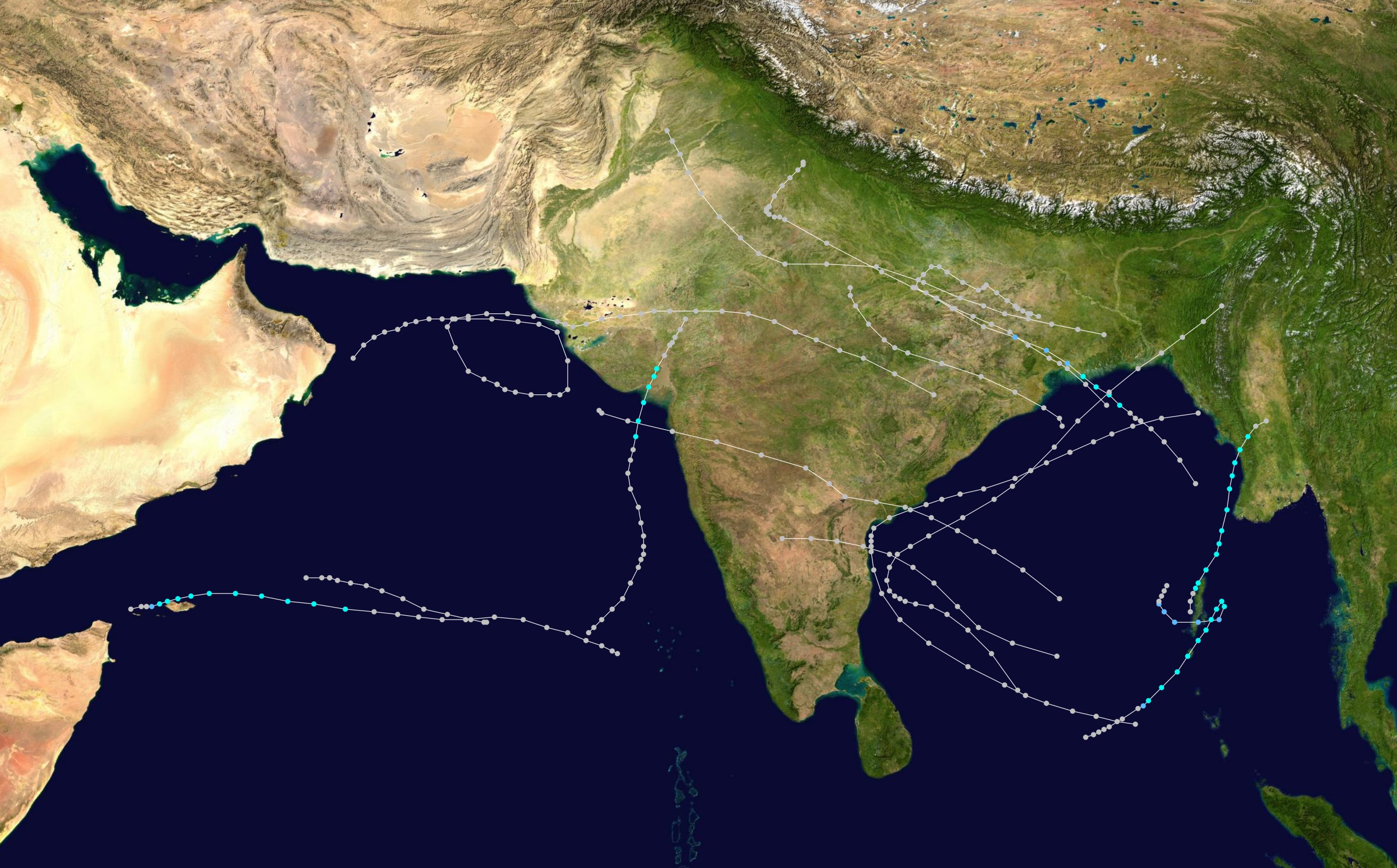
- Season summary map

Seasonal boundaries
- First system formed: April 29, 1976
- Last system dissipated: January 3, 1977

Strongest storm
- Name: Two
  - Maximum winds: 165 km/h (105 mph) (3-minute sustained)

Seasonal statistics
- Cyclonic storms: 8 (second highest, tied with 2019)
- Total fatalities: Unknown
- Total damage: Unknown

Related articles
- 1976 Atlantic hurricane season; 1976 Pacific hurricane season; 1976 Pacific typhoon season

The 1976 North Indian Ocean cyclone season was part of the annual cycle of tropical cyclone formation. The season has no official bounds but cyclones tend to form between April and December. These dates conventionally delimit the period of each year when most tropical cyclones form in the northern Indian Ocean. There are two main seas in the North Indian Ocean—the Bay of Bengal to the east of the Indian subcontinent and the Arabian Sea to the west of India. The official Regional Specialized Meteorological Centre in this basin is the India Meteorological Department (IMD), while the Joint Typhoon Warning Center (JTWC) releases unofficial advisories. An average of five tropical cyclones form in the North Indian Ocean every season with peaks in May and November. Cyclones occurring between the meridians 45°E and 100°E are included in the season by the IMD.

== Systems ==
=== Tropical Storm One (01B) ===
- Cyclonic storm (IMD)
- Tropical storm (SSHWS)
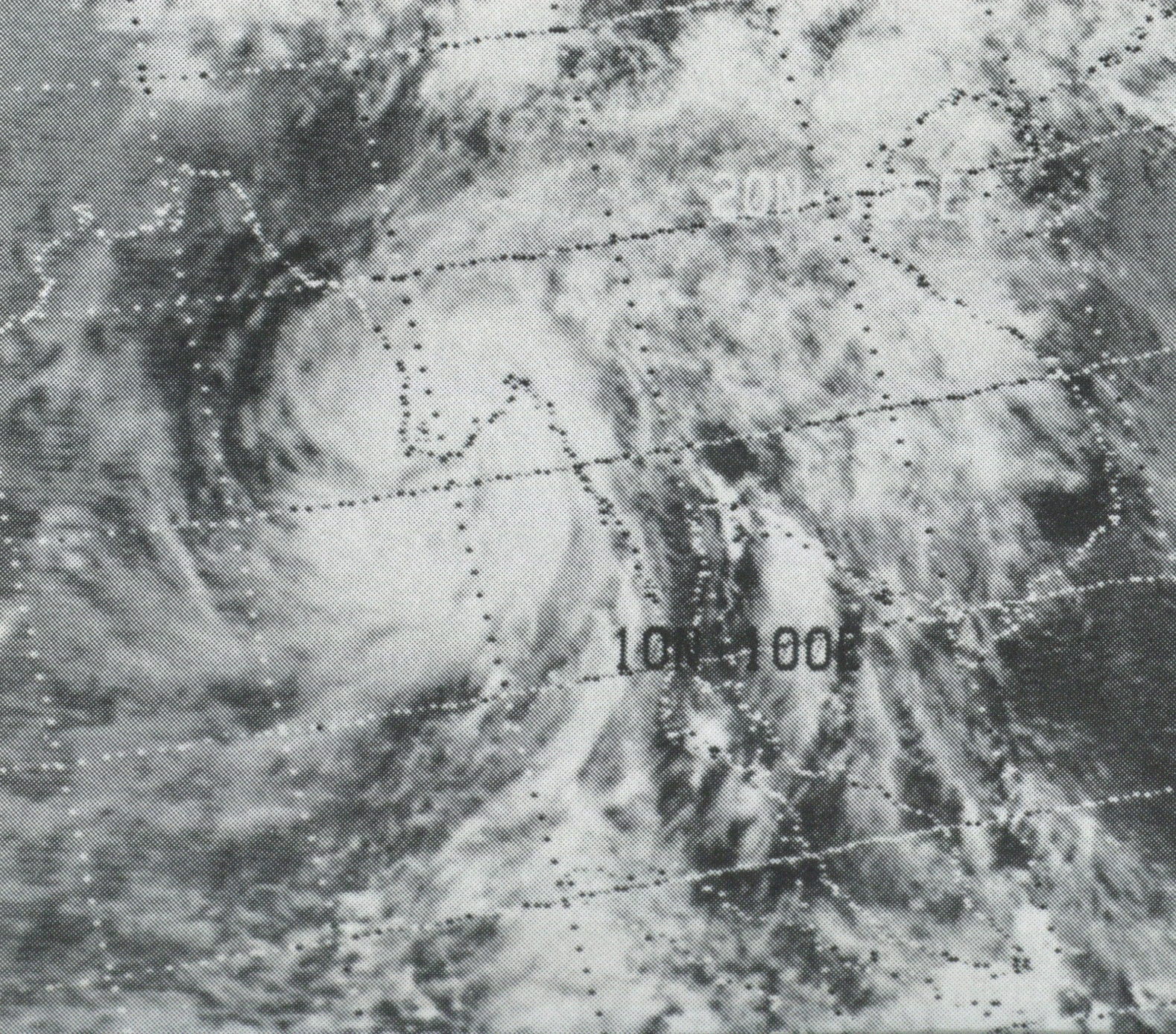
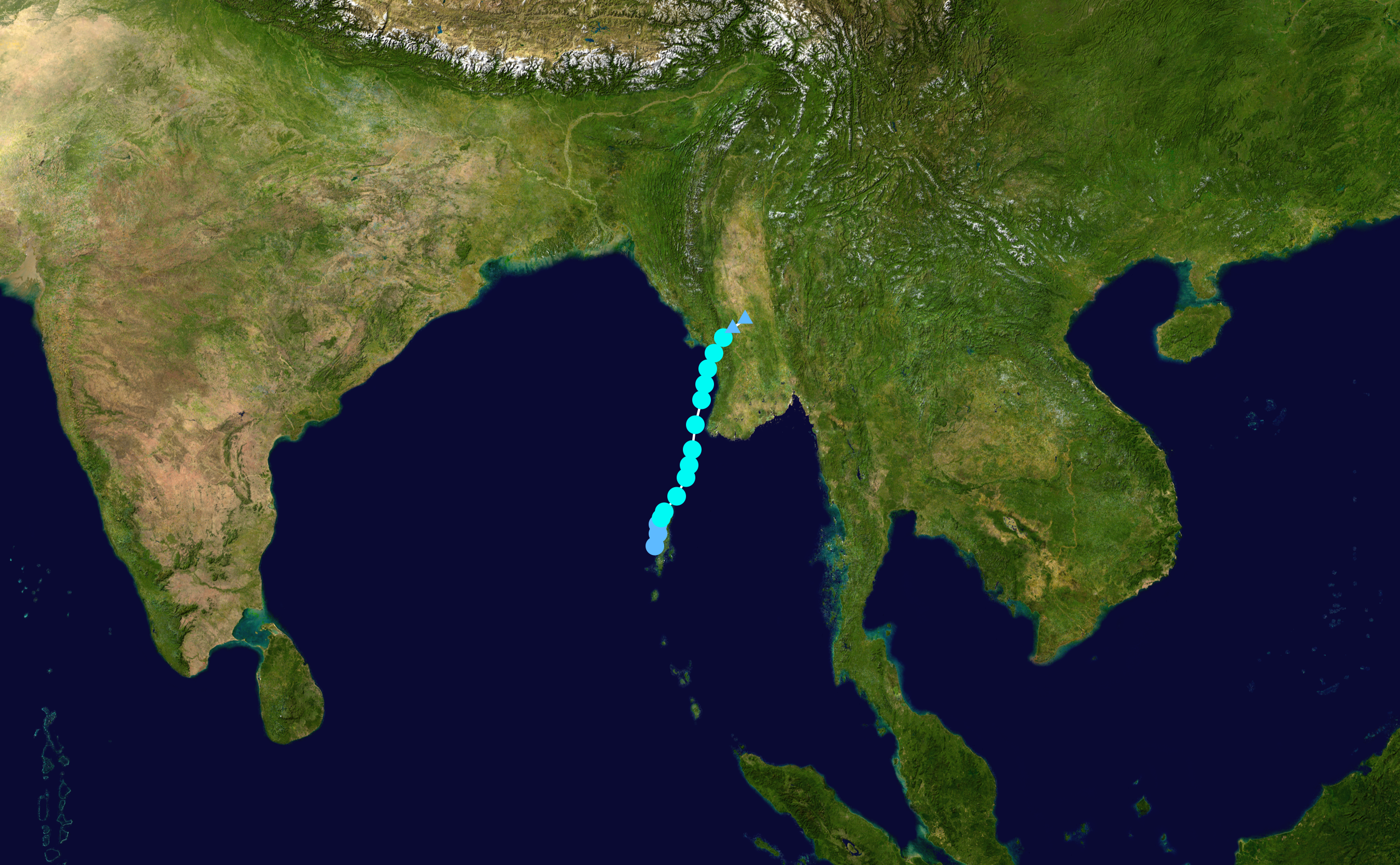
- Duration: April 29 – May 2
- Peak intensity: 85 km/h (50 mph) (3-min);

=== Cyclone Two (02A) ===
- Extremely severe cyclonic storm (IMD)
- Tropical storm (SSHWS)
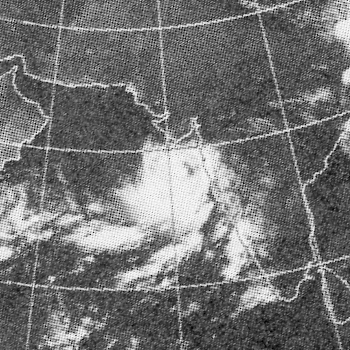
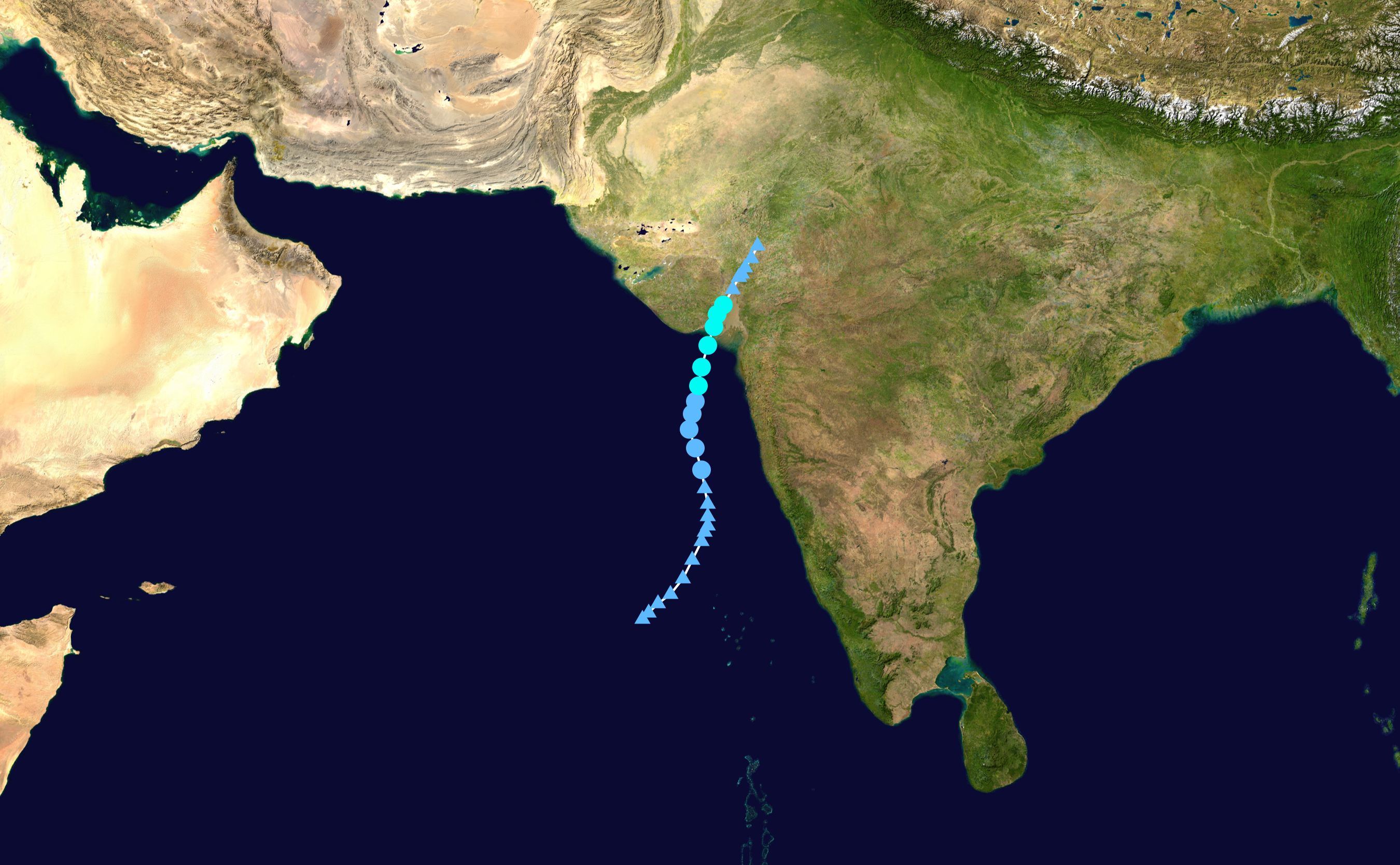
- Duration: May 31 – June 6
- Peak intensity: 165 km/h (105 mph) (3-min);

This cyclone was formed on 31 May and gradually intensified to a severe cyclone. On 3 June, the storm made landfall over Gujarat and rapidly weakened thereafter. Offshore the ship Haakon Magnus reported gust winds as high as 165 kmph. 70 people and 4500 cattle were killed due to the storm with 25,000 houses damaged. Damages were estimated to be ₹3 crore (equivalent to ₹99 crore or US$10 million in 2026).

=== Tropical Storm Six (06B) ===
- Deep depression (IMD)
- Tropical storm (SSHWS)
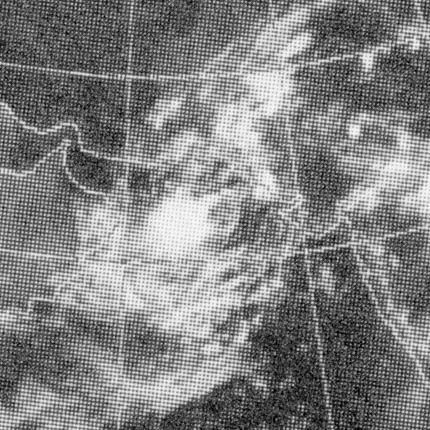
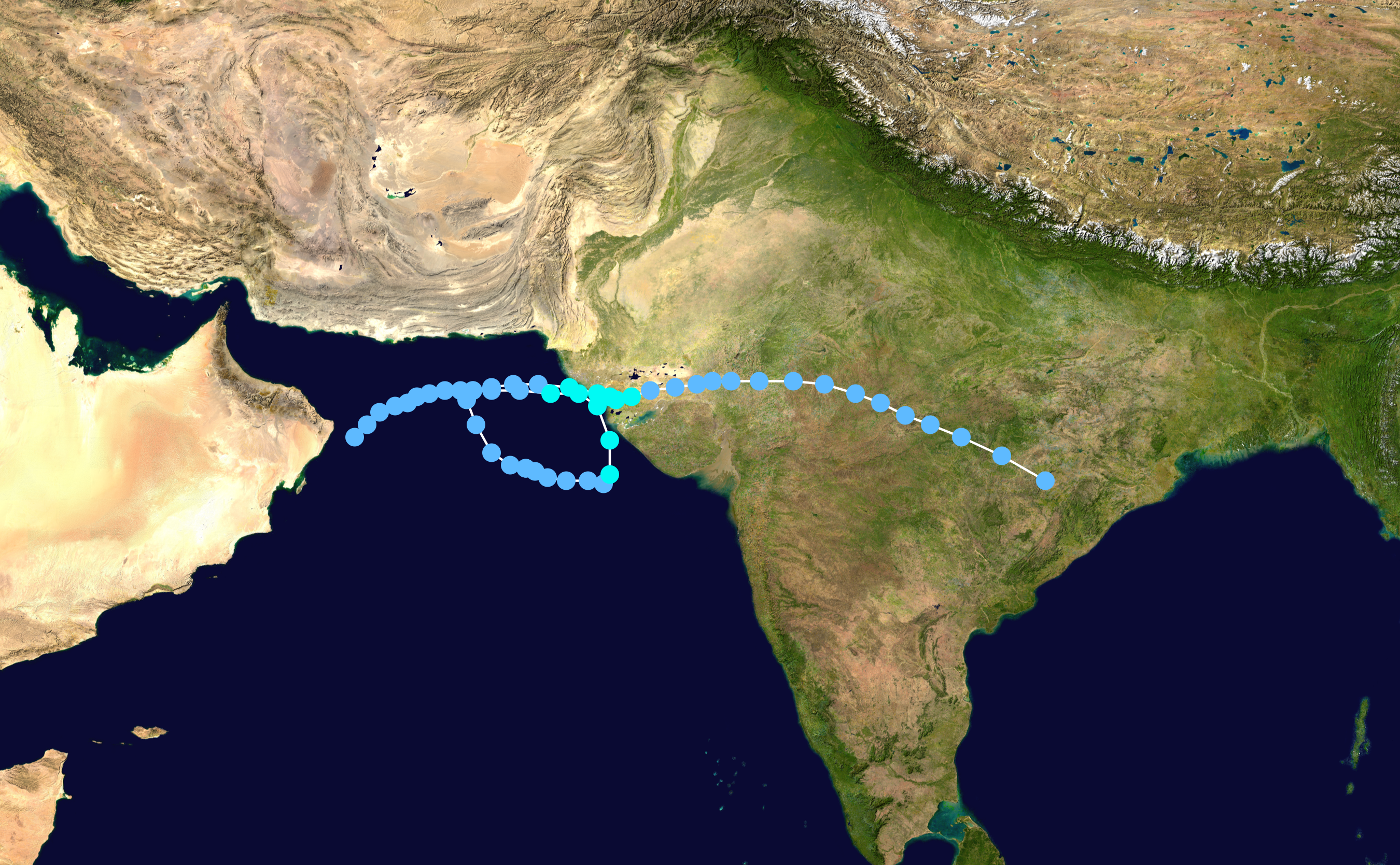
- Duration: August 27 – September 9
- Peak intensity: 55 km/h (35 mph) (3-min);

The depression formed over Orissa on 27 August and moved in west-northwest direction across the plains of India from Chhattisgarh, East Rajasthan and North Gujarat. It later intensified into a cyclonic storm near Gujarat coast on 31 August. Then it moved into the Arabian Sea and made a loop. It dissipated over the northwest Arabian Sea near the coast of Oman on 8 September.

=== Tropical Storm Seven (07B) ===
- Very severe cyclonic storm (IMD)
- Tropical storm (SSHWS)
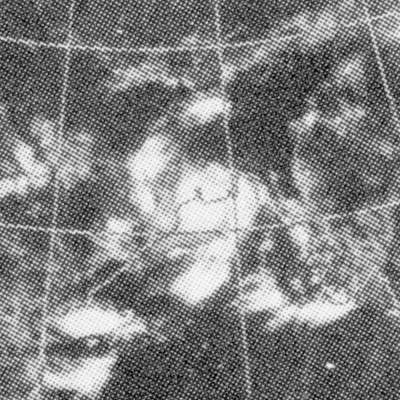
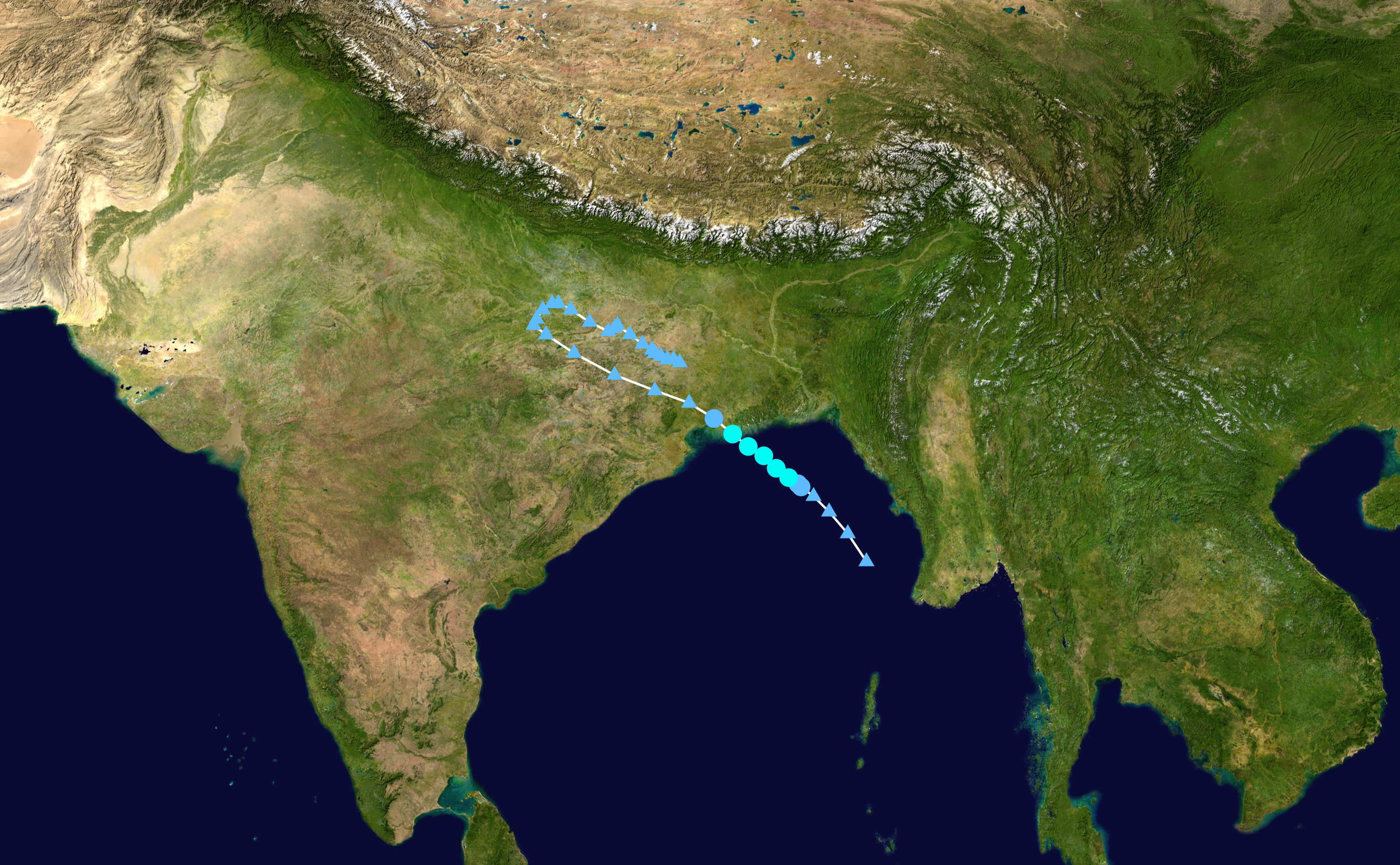
- Duration: September 6 – September 19
- Peak intensity: 130 km/h (80 mph) (3-min);

This system formed on 6 September and rapidly intensified into a very severe cyclonic storm the next day. The storm then made landfall at Contai in West Bengal on September 11. Its remnants tracked until Madhya Pradesh and dissipated on 16 September. The storm killed 40 people and 4,000 cattle. Up to 1.25 lakh hectares crops were damaged in India. In Contai, wind speed attained speeds as high as 155 kph at the time of landfall.

=== Tropical Storm Eight (08A) ===
- Cyclonic storm (IMD)
- Tropical storm (SSHWS)
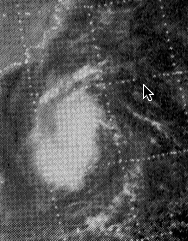
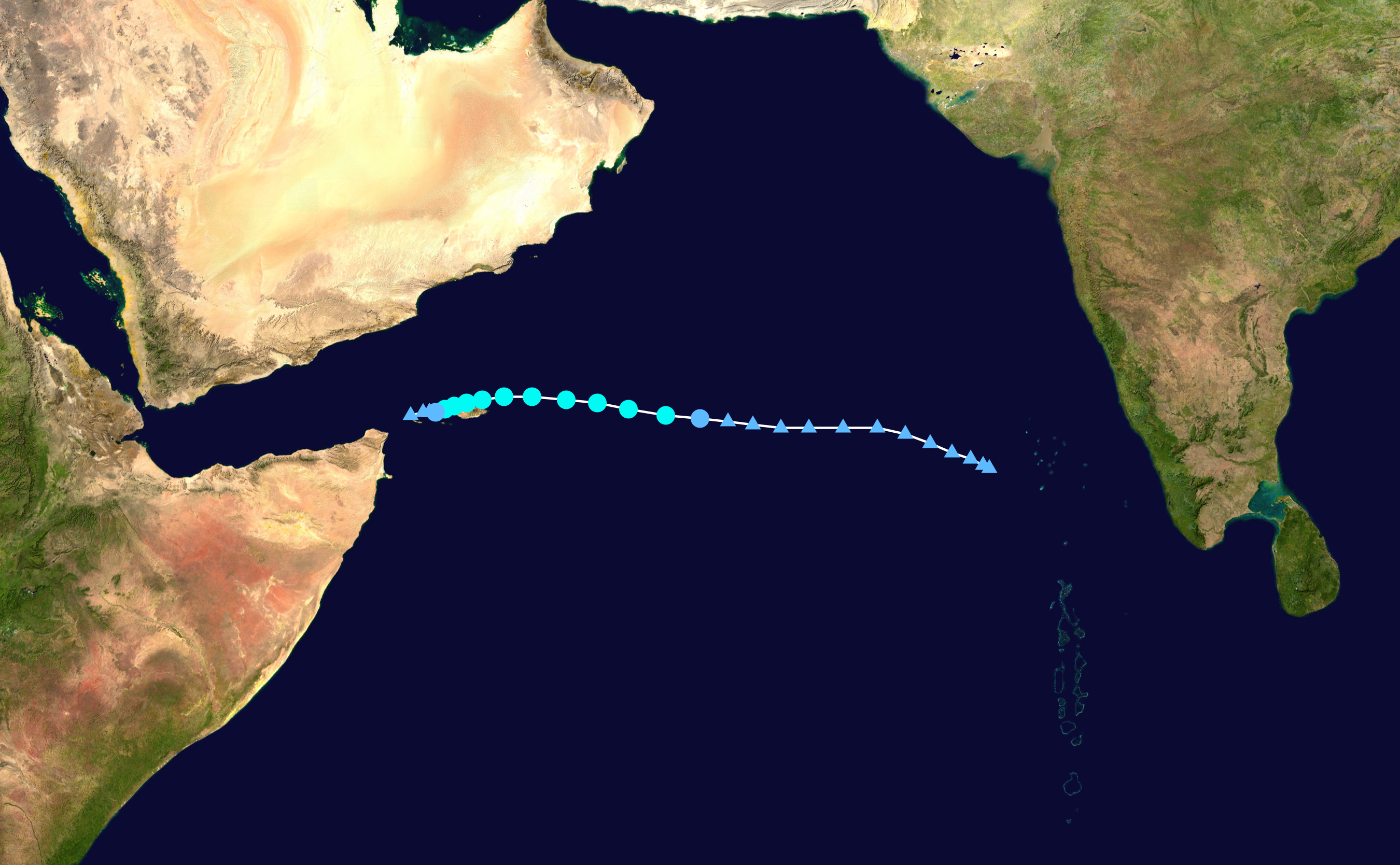
- Duration: October 12 – October 19
- Peak intensity: 75 km/h (45 mph) (3-min);

=== Tropical Storm Nine (09B) ===
- Cyclonic storm (IMD)
- Tropical storm (SSHWS)
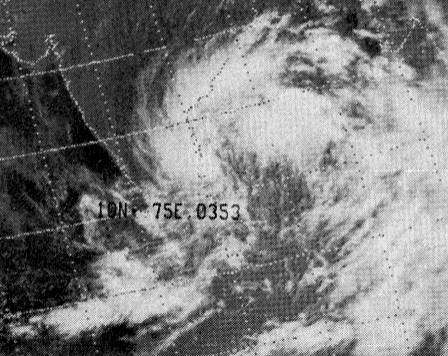
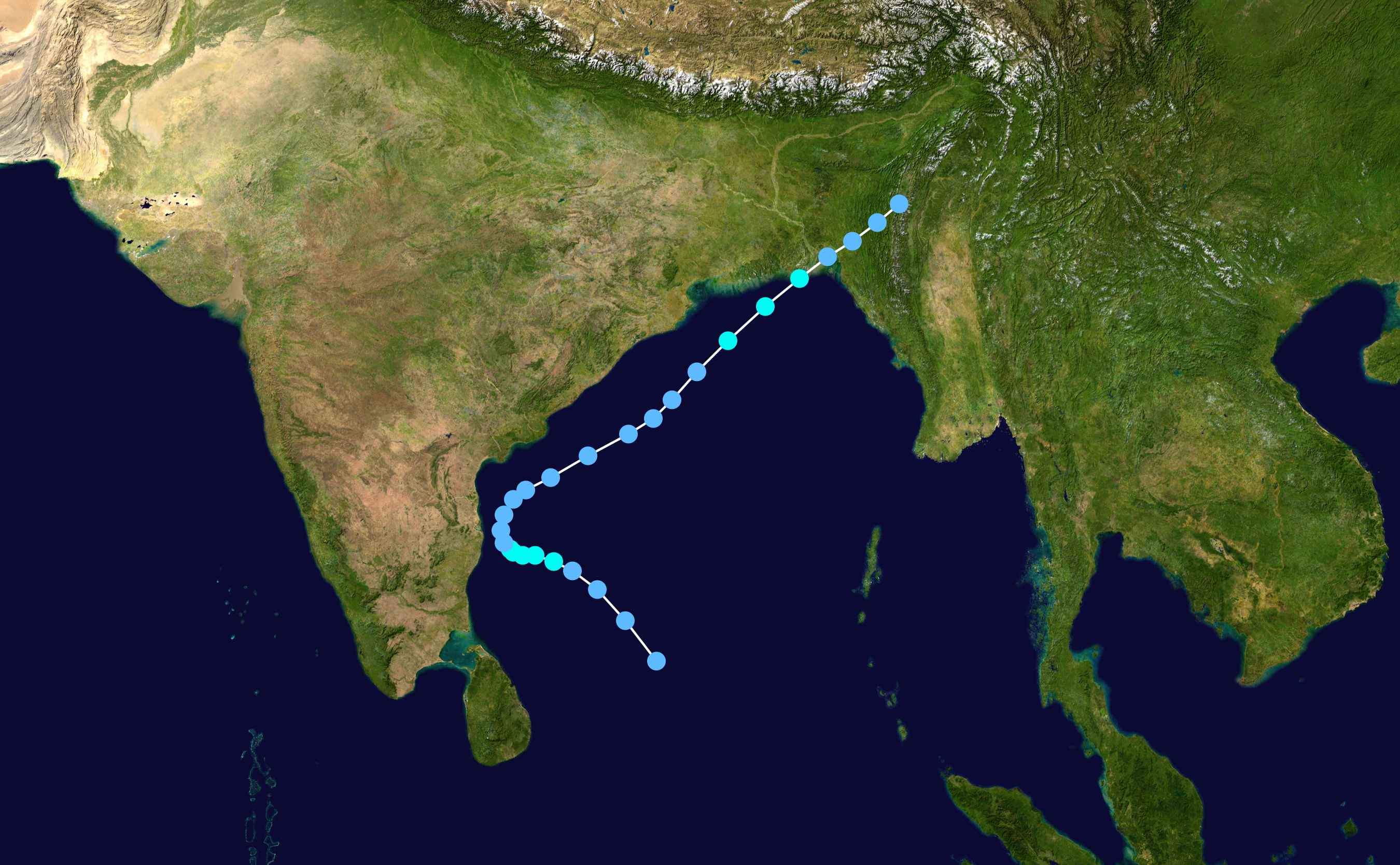
- Duration: October 14 – October 19
- Peak intensity: 65 km/h (40 mph) (3-min);

=== Cyclone Ten (10B) ===
- Severe cyclonic storm (IMD)
- Category 1 tropical cyclone (SSHWS)
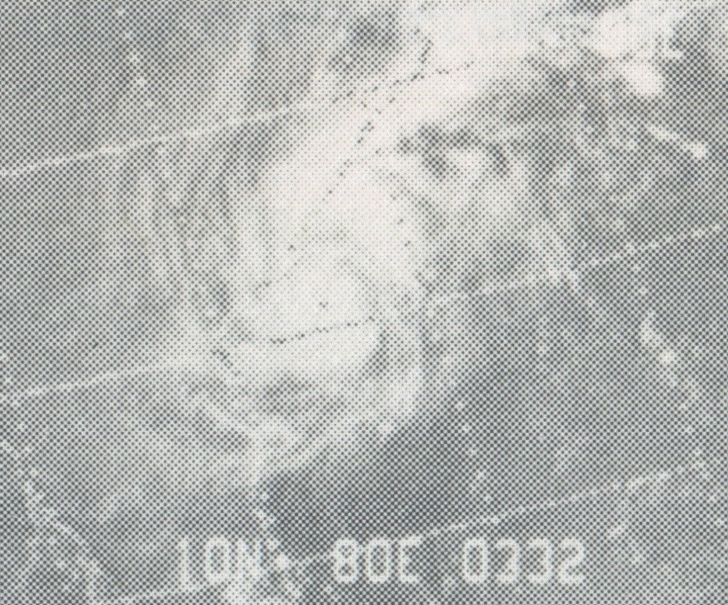
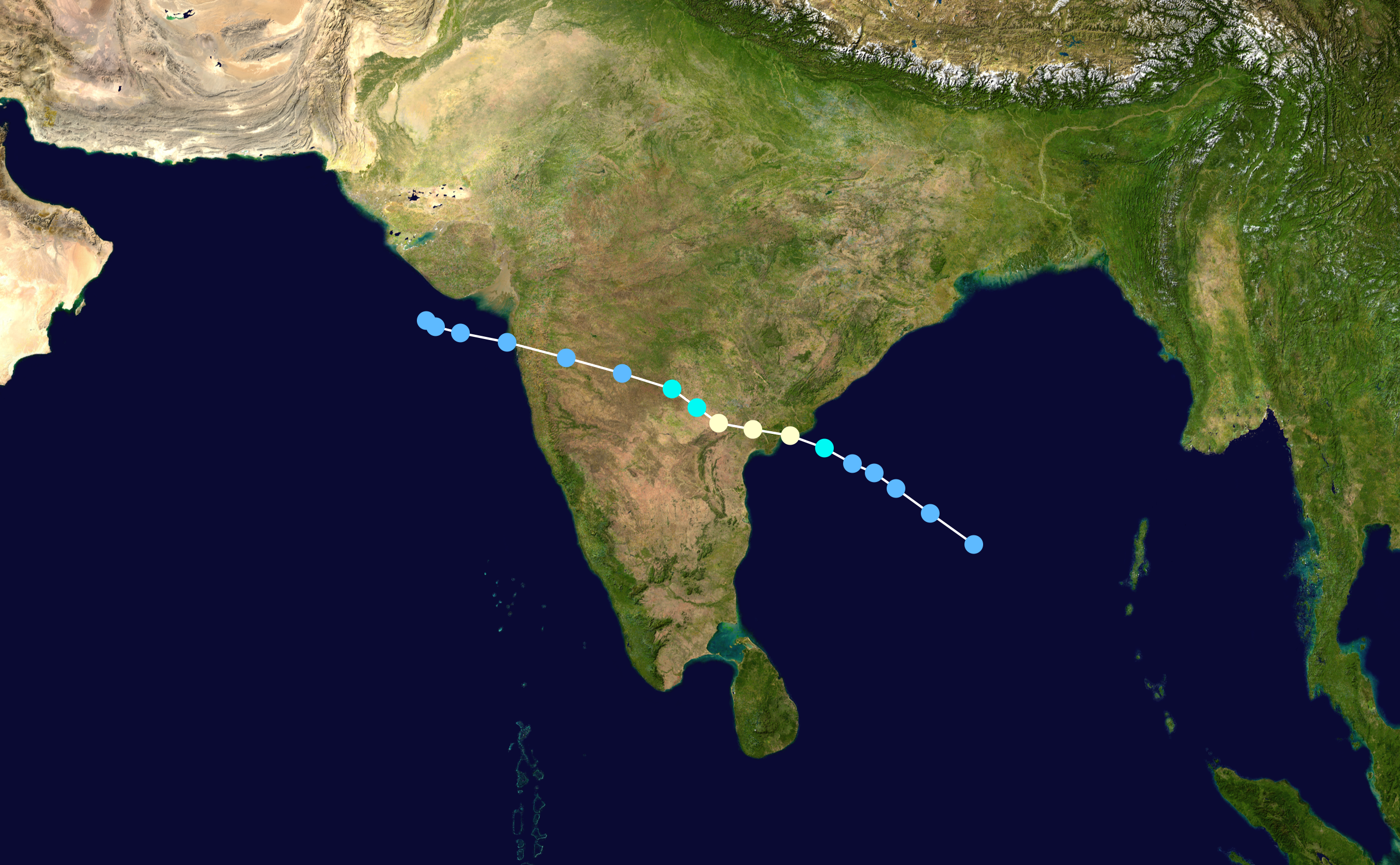
- Duration: November 1 – November 6
- Peak intensity: 100 km/h (65 mph) (3-min);

This cyclone was formed on 1 November and gradually peaked to a severe cyclonic storm or Category-1 equivalent cyclone. This cyclone made landfall on 4 November close to the city of Machilipatnam. It weakened slowly and its remnants reached into the Arabian Sea on 6 November, where it couldn't able to regenerate due to unfavourable conditions and dissipated by the same night. 25 people were killed due to the storm and 13 fishermen remain missing.

=== Cyclone Twelve (12B) ===
- Very severe cyclonic storm (IMD)
- Category 1 tropical cyclone (SSHWS)
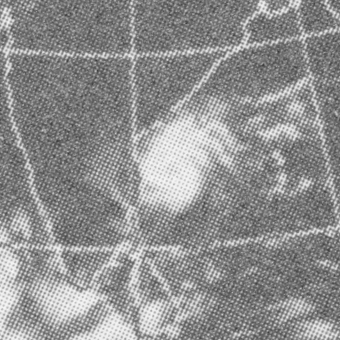
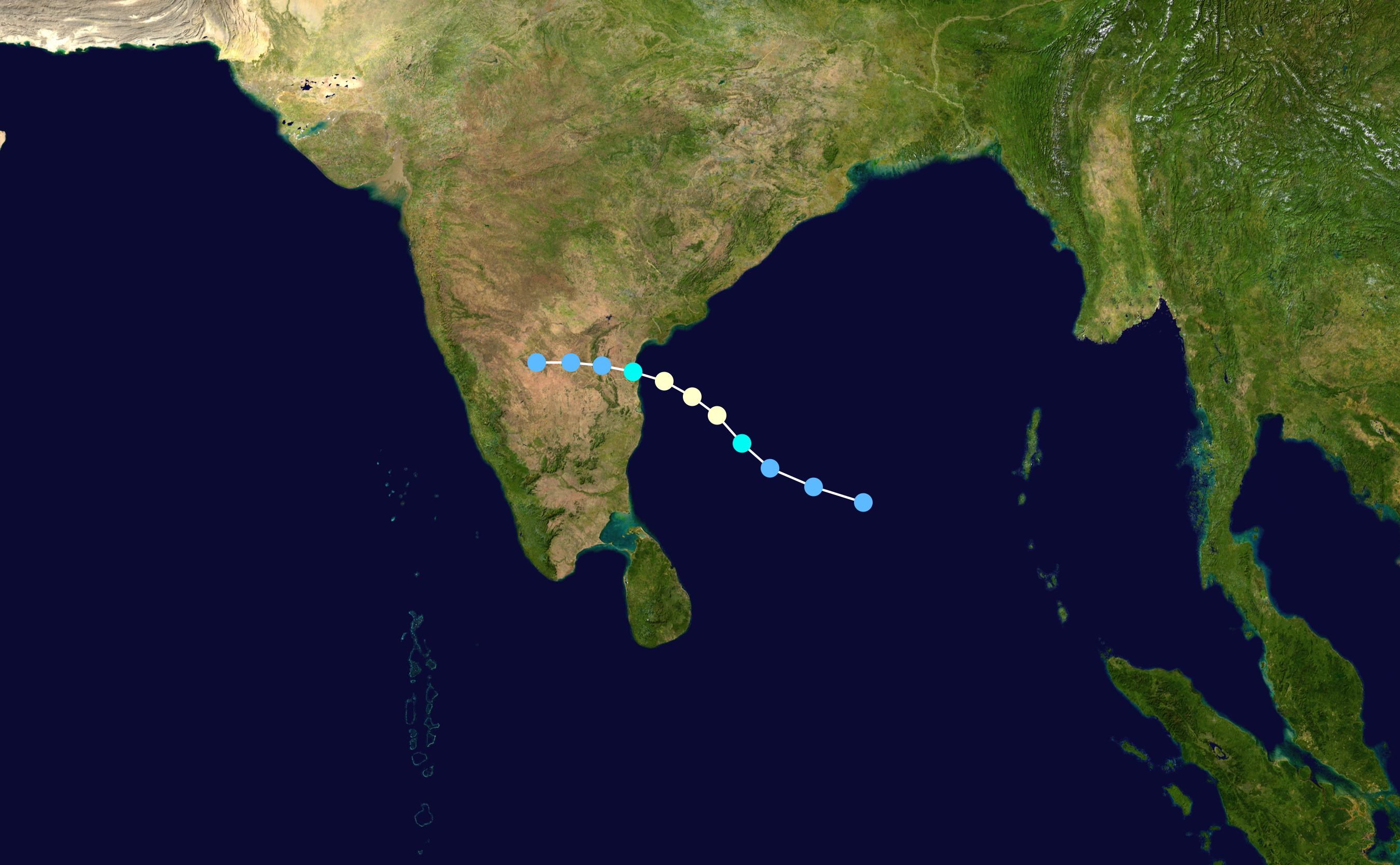
- Duration: November 15 – November 17
- Peak intensity: 120 km/h (75 mph) (3-min);

This cyclone was formed on 15 November. Despite remaining just offshore Andhra Pradesh, the storm rapidly intensified into a severe cyclone and reached hurricane intensity. By the next day, the storm made landfall between Nellore and Kavali in its peak intensity and dissipated over Rayalaseema on 17 November. 30 people were reported to be killed due to the storm along with 10,000 houses damaged. Damages in Indian Rupees were estimated to be 3.9 crores. Nellore District was the worst affected due to the storm.

=== Tropical Storm Thirteen (13B) ===
- Depression (IMD)
- Tropical storm (SSHWS)
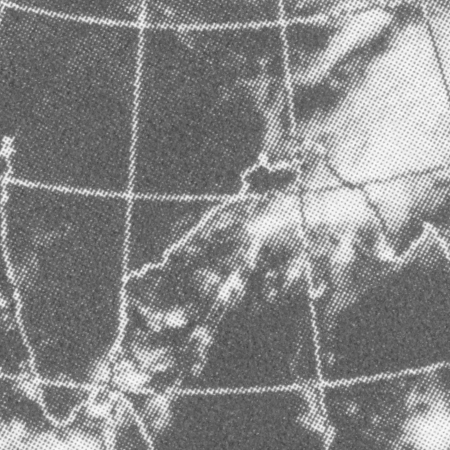
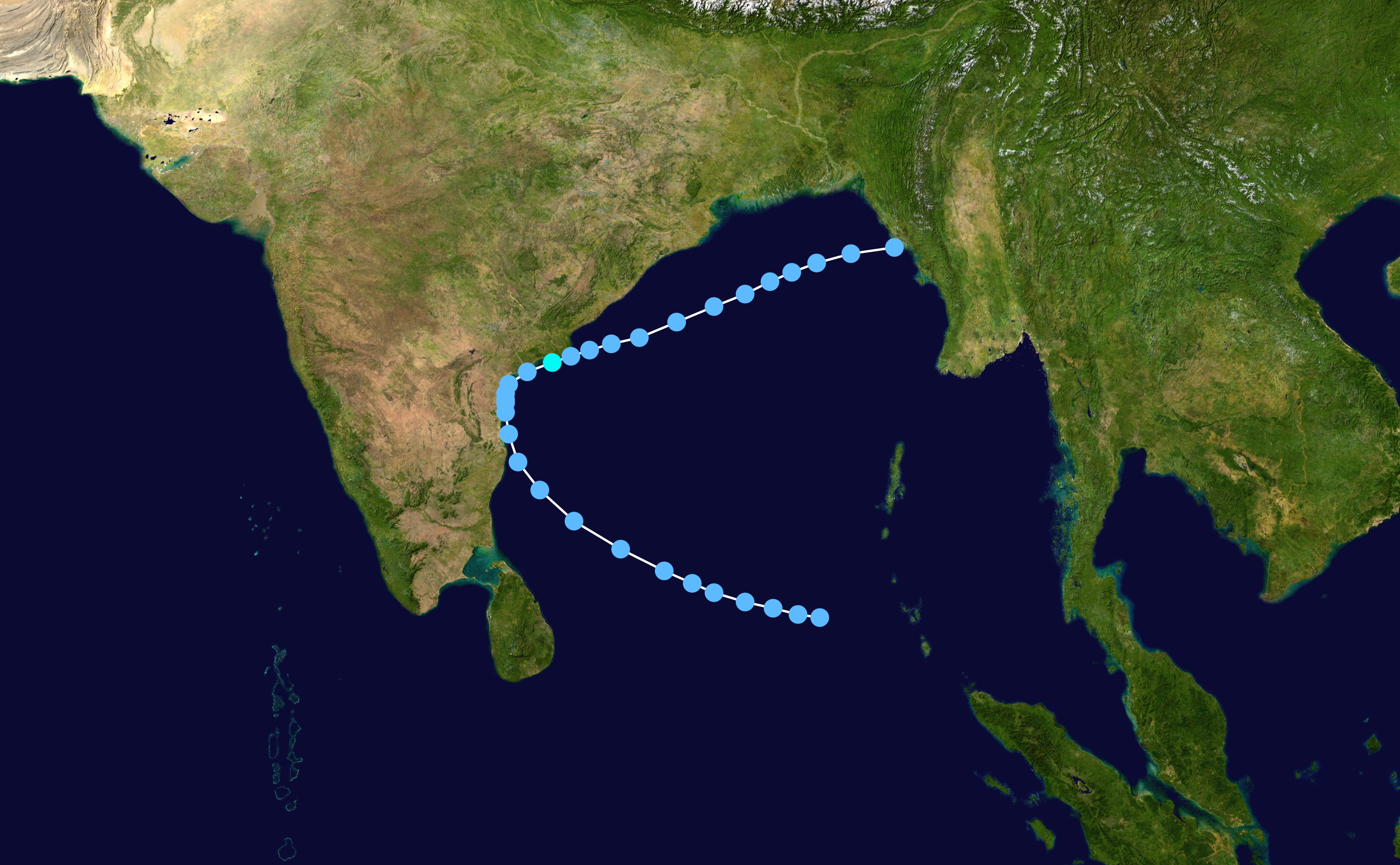
- Duration: November 22 – November 30
- Peak intensity: 45 km/h (30 mph) (3-min);

=== Cyclone Fourteen (14B) ===
- Severe cyclonic storm (IMD)
- Category 1 tropical cyclone (SSHWS)
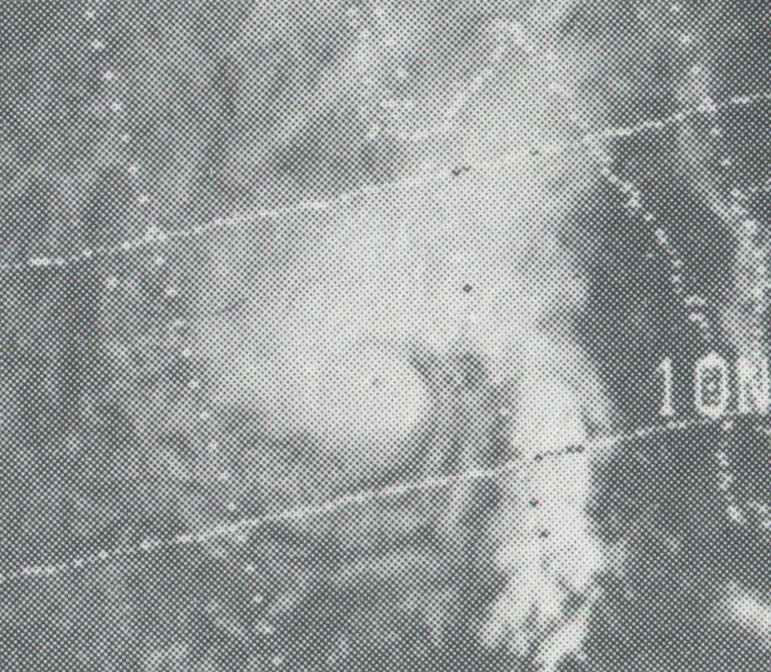
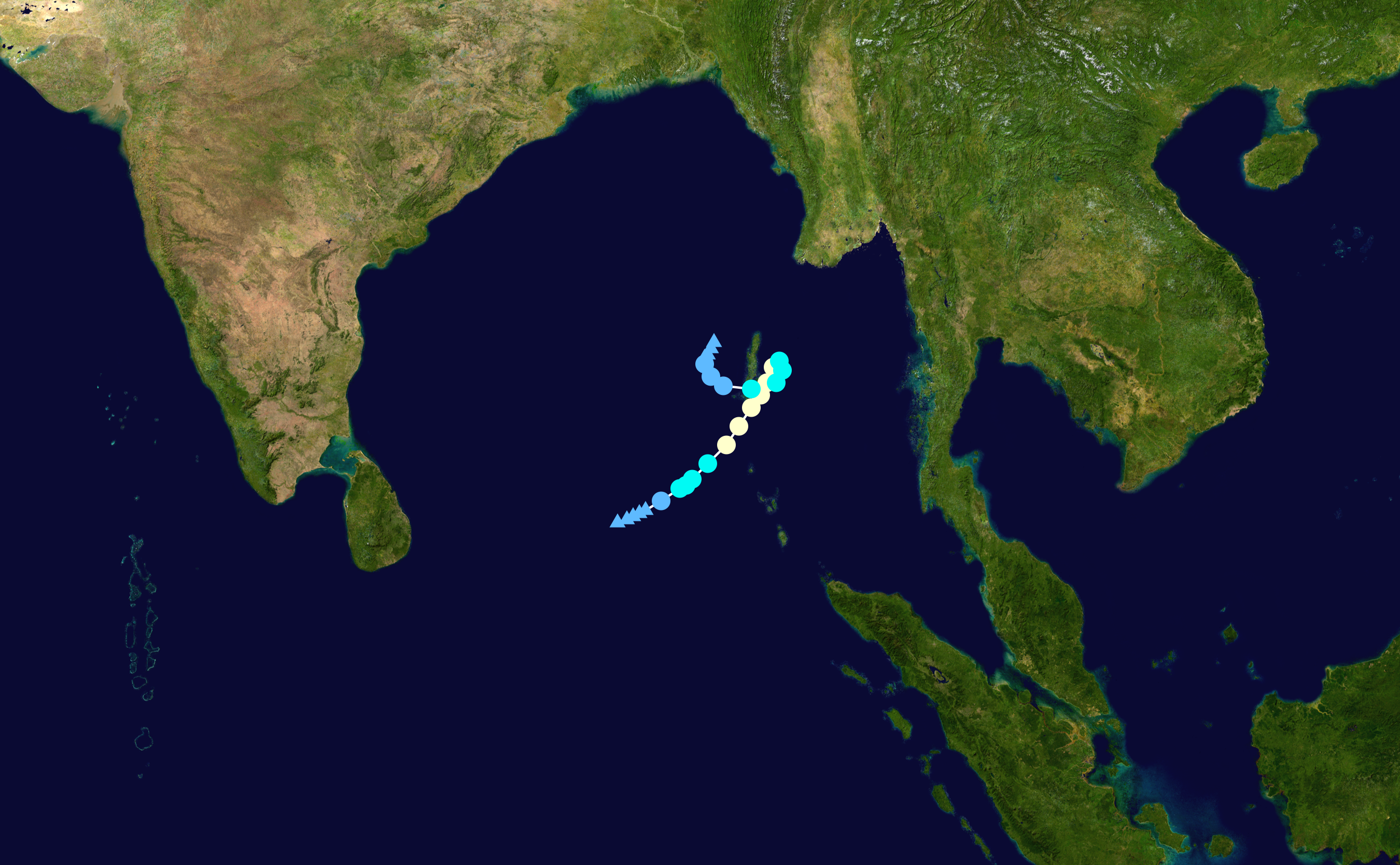
- Duration: December 27 – January 3
- Peak intensity: 95 km/h (60 mph) (3-min);

== See also ==
- North Indian Ocean tropical cyclone
- 1976 Atlantic hurricane season
- 1976 Pacific hurricane season
- 1976 Pacific typhoon season
- Australian cyclone seasons: 1975–76, 1976–77
- South Pacific cyclone seasons: 1975–76, 1976–77
- South-West Indian Ocean cyclone seasons: 1975–76, 1976–77
