= 1976 Atlantic hurricane season =

- Season summary map

Seasonal boundaries
- First system formed: May 21, 1976
- Last system dissipated: October 28, 1976

Strongest storm
- Name: Belle
  - Maximum winds: 120 mph (195 km/h) (1-minute sustained)
  - Lowest pressure: 957 mbar (hPa; 28.26 inHg)

Seasonal statistics
- Total depressions: 21
- Total storms: 10
- Hurricanes: 6
- Major hurricanes (Cat. 3+): 2
- Total fatalities: 84 total
- Total damage: $101.63 million (1976 USD)

Related articles
- 1976 Pacific hurricane season; 1976 Pacific typhoon season; 1976 North Indian Ocean cyclone season

The 1976 Atlantic hurricane season was a fairly average Atlantic hurricane season in which 21 tropical or subtropical cyclones formed. 10 of them became nameable storms. Six of those reached hurricane strength, with two of the six becoming major hurricanes, which are Category 3 or higher on the Saffir–Simpson scale. The season officially began on June 1 and lasted until November 30. These dates conventionally delimit the period of each year when most tropical cyclones form in the Atlantic basin. However, the first system, a subtropical storm, developed in the Gulf of Mexico on May 21, several days before the official start of the season. The system spawned nine tornadoes in Florida, resulting in about $628,000 (1976 USD) in damage, though impact was minor otherwise.

The season featured only one fully tropical storm throughout the Caribbean Sea and the Gulf of Mexico, a rare occurrence. The strongest hurricane of the season was Hurricane Belle, which reached Category 3 intensity east of North Carolina. Belle later struck Long Island, New York, as a Category 1 hurricane, causing $100 million in damage and a total of 12 deaths between the Carolinas and New England, as well as an additional $1 million in damage in the Canadian province of New Brunswick. Tropical Storm Dottie and a subtropical storm in mid-September produced minor damage in the Southeastern United States; the former also caused four deaths in the Bahamas after a fishing boat capsized. Although Hurricane Emmy left little damage in the Azores, poor weather conditions resulted in a plane crash at Lajes Field, killing 68 people. Collectively, the tropical cyclones of this season resulted in 84 deaths and about $101.63 million in damage.

== Seasonal summary ==
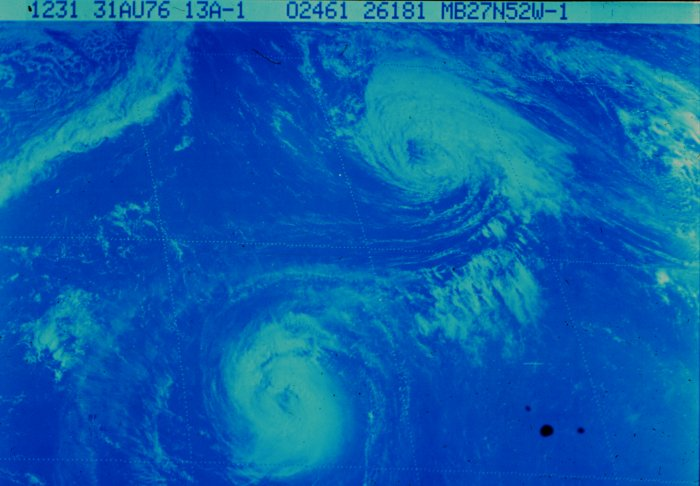
The Fujiwhara interaction between hurricanes Emmy and Frances on August 31

The hurricane season officially began on June 1, though the first tropical cyclone developed on May 21. A total of 21 tropical and subtropical cyclones formed, but just 10 of them intensified into nameable storm systems. This was about average compared to the 1950–2000 average of 9.6 named storms. Six of these reached hurricane status, around the 1950–2000 average of 5.9. Furthermore, two systems reached major hurricane status; close to the 1950–2000 average of 2.3. Collectively, the cyclones of this season caused at least 84 deaths and about $101.63 million in damage. The Atlantic hurricane season officially ended on November 30, with the final cyclone becoming extratropical on October 28.

The season was noted for a lack of activity in both the Caribbean Sea and Gulf of Mexico. Just one fully tropical storm, Dottie, developed in the Gulf of Mexico and none in the Caribbean Sea. Since 1900, only 1962 had fewer tropical storms (none) in those regions. Suppression of activity in the Gulf of Mexico and Caribbean was primarily attributed to early intrusions of cold air – with unusually cold air masses impacting much of the United States east of the Rocky Mountains during October – and a persistent area of above average vertical wind shear over the western Caribbean. Elsewhere, sea surface temperatures across the Atlantic basin were generally at or slightly above average during the middle of the season.

Tropical cyclogenesis began early, with the development of a subtropical storm on May 21. Two tropical depression formed in June, though neither reached tropical storm status. Another two depressions formed in July and also did not become tropical storms, followed by the development of Tropical Storm Anna on July 28. August featured five of the season's ten named storms, including Tropical Storm Dottie and hurricanes Belle, Candice, Emmy, and Frances. In September, six cyclones developed – a subtropical storm, Hurricane Gloria, and four tropical depressions that remained below tropical storm intensity. Two more non-intensifying depressions formed in October. Hurricane Holly, the final system, formed on October 22 and transitioned into an extratropical cyclone on October 28.

The year's activity was reflected with an accumulated cyclone energy (ACE) rating of 84, classifying it as a "near-normal" season. ACE is a metric used to express the energy used by a tropical cyclone during its lifetime. Therefore, a storm with a longer duration will have high values of ACE. It is only calculated at six-hour increments in which specific tropical and subtropical systems are either at or above sustained wind speeds of 39 mph (63 km/h), which is the threshold for tropical storm intensity.

== Systems ==
=== Subtropical Storm One ===
- Subtropical storm (SSHWS)
- Duration: May 21 – May 25
- Peak intensity: 50 mph (85 km/h) (1-min); 994 mbar (hPa)

On May 19 an upper-level trough produced widespread thunderstorms over the Gulf of Mexico. Slowly, the system organized, first to a subtropical depression on May 21, then to a subtropical storm on May 23. The storm began to move faster, and on May 23, it hit the Florida Panhandle. After moving across Georgia at a forward motion of 25 mph (40 km/h) the storm reached its peak of maximum sustained winds reaching 50 mph (85 km/h) while southeast of the Carolinas on May 24. After transitioning into an extratropical cyclone, the system traveled generally northeast and ultimately dissipated on May 31 south of Iceland.

Heavy rainfall was associated with the system, but the precipitation was generally beneficial due to dry conditions. The storm spawned nine tornadoes in Florida, with one in Hillsborough County destroying 6 mobile homes and damaging 40 others; demolishing 6 large chicken houses; and severely damaging a paint plant in Hillsborough County. Overall, the tornadoes left about $628,000 in damage. A total of 3,364 household lost power in the Hillsborough County after three circuits were blown down. Some wind damage occurred in northeastern Palm Beach County, mostly limited to a few roofs damaged and downed trees, electrical poles, and power lines. The storm left about 15,000 people without electricity in Broward County, though most outages were restored quickly. Boat traffic along the New River was backed-up due to the storm causing the draw bridge to malfunction. Farther north, the storm dropped rainfall in a few other states, with a peak precipitation total of 7.57 in (192 mm) at Sullivan's Island, South Carolina.

=== Tropical Storm Anna ===
- Tropical storm (SSHWS)
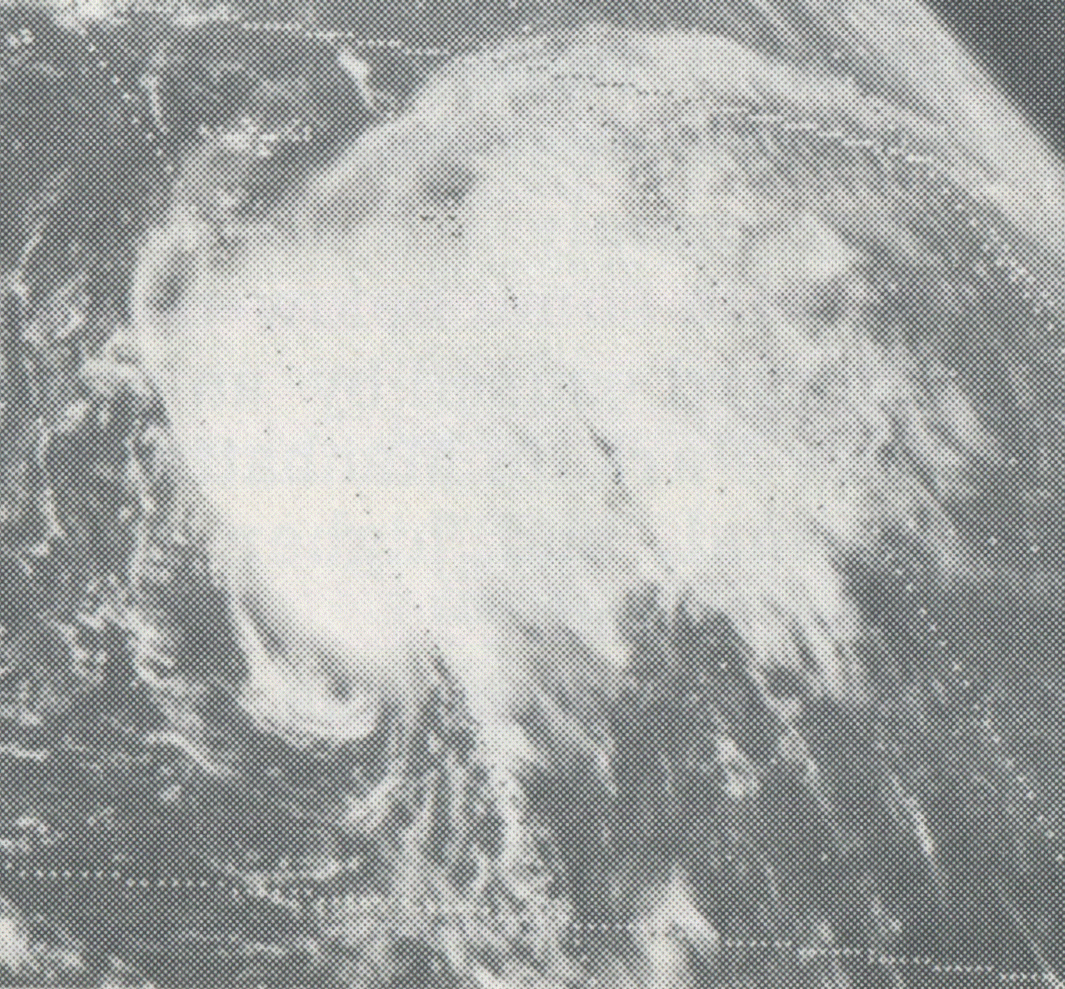
- Duration: July 28 – August 1
- Peak intensity: 45 mph (75 km/h) (1-min); 999 mbar (hPa)

A non-tropical low pressure area developed over the central Atlantic in late July. After merging with a polar trough on July 28, a subtropical depression developed about 800 mi (1,300 km) east-southeast of Bermuda at 18:00 UTC. The subtropical depression moved eastward and strengthened into a subtropical storm early on July 30, based on reports from the ship M.S. Pointe Allegre, which observed a barometric pressure of 999 mbar (29.5 inHg) and wind gusts as high as 69 mph (111 km/h). The cyclone peaked with maximum sustained winds of 45 mph (75 km/h) at 12:00 UTC on July 30. Curving east-northeastward, the system also acquired tropical characteristics, with a transition to Tropical Storm Anna becoming complete about six hours later. The surface ridge to the north and east caused Anna to begin curving northeastward on August 1. Anna soon lost tropical characteristics and became an extratropical cyclone while situated about 110 mi (180 km) east-southeast of the Azores. The remnants moved in a circular path and approached the Azores from the north, before dissipating on August 16. Gale-force winds were reported in the Azores after Anna became extratropical.

=== Hurricane Belle ===
- Category 3 hurricane (SSHWS)
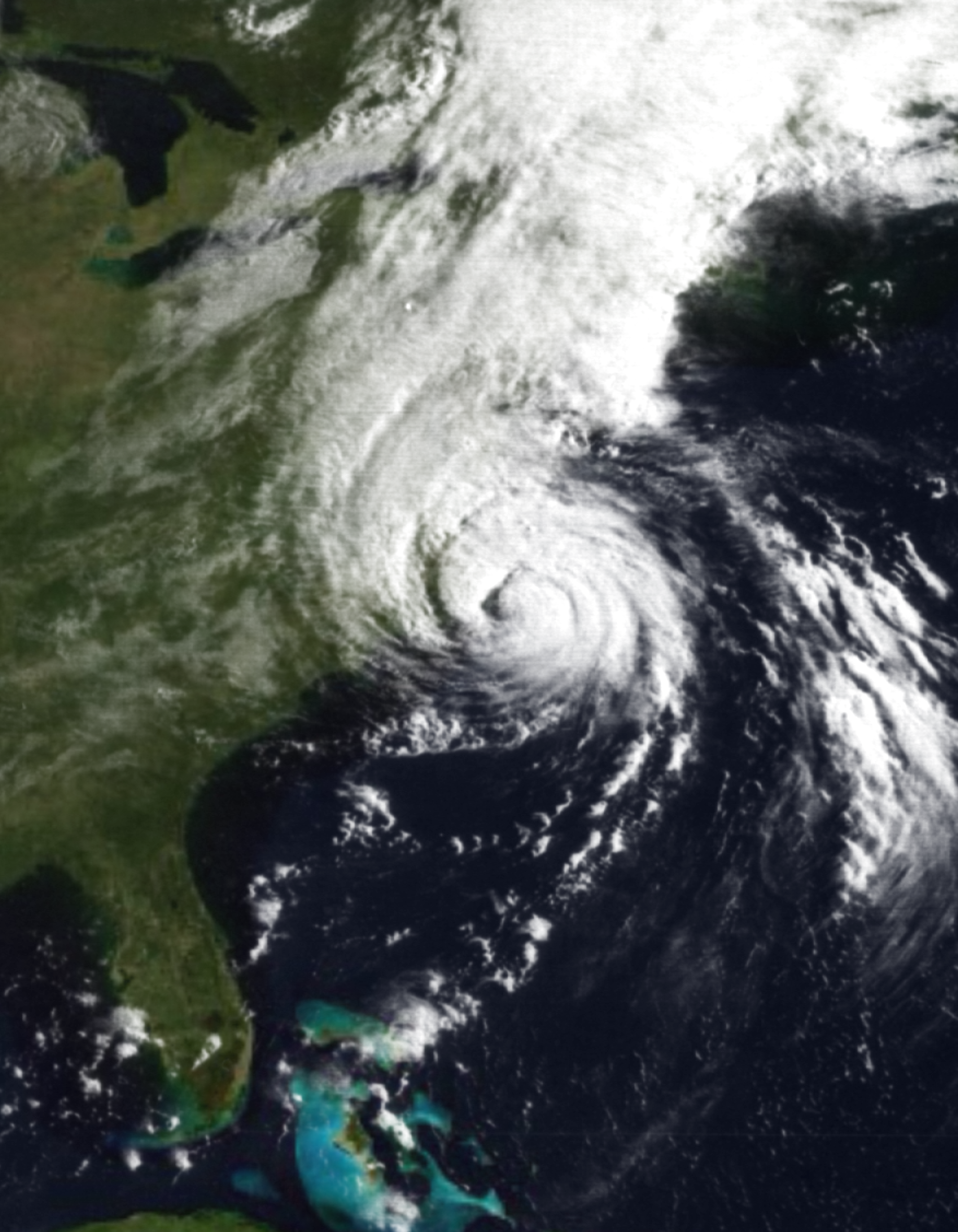
- Duration: August 6 – August 10
- Peak intensity: 120 mph (195 km/h) (1-min); 957 mbar (hPa)

In late July, a tropical wave emerged off the west coast of Africa. Traversing the Atlantic Ocean for more than a week, the system eventually consolidated into a tropical depression near the Bahamas on August 6. Remaining nearly stationary for a day, the depression strengthened into Tropical Storm Belle on August 7 and a hurricane later that day as it acquired a northwest motion. Formation of an eye accompanied quick intensification and Belle reached its peak the following day with maximum sustained winds of 120 mph (195 km/h). The hurricane subsequently turned north and accelerated, skirting the Outer Banks of North Carolina. Early on August 10, Belle made landfall in Long Island, New York, as a minimal hurricane before moving inland over southern New England as a tropical storm hours later. Thereafter, Belle transitioned into an extratropical cyclone before moving over Atlantic Canada. The system turned east while over the north Atlantic and ultimately dissipated on August 15 to the south of Iceland.

Threatening much of the East Coast of the United States, hurricane warnings were issued from Georgia to Maine. An estimated 500,000 people evacuated coastal areas accordingly. Five people lost their lives in a car accident on a rain-slicked highway near the North Carolina–Virginia state line; another person died due to a car accident in Norfolk, Virginia. In New York, damage on Long Island reached $8 million, of which $3 million stemmed from erosion at Rockaway Beach. One person was killed in New York when a branch snapped off a tree due to high winds and fell on her. Approximately 36,000 residents in the lower Hudson Valley lost electricity. In Connecticut, strong winds in Bridgeport downed trees, which fell on barns, porches, and homes. About 247,000 people lost electricity throughout the state. Three deaths occurred in Connecticut, one from an accident caused by slippery roads and the other two from carbon monoxide poisoning from a generator. Flooding was reported across New England and was especially severe in Vermont. The hardest hit town was Chester, where 35 of its 85 roads flooded and 5 bridges were washed out. Two people died in Huntington after the footbridge they were crossing collapsed into the Huntington River. A total of 12 people lost their lives and damage reached an estimated $100 million. In Canada, heavy rains fell across New Brunswick, amounting to 7 in (180 mm) in Edmundston, triggering flooding that damaged crops, homes, and roads. Damage estimates reached at least $1 million.

=== Tropical Storm Dottie ===
- Tropical storm (SSHWS)
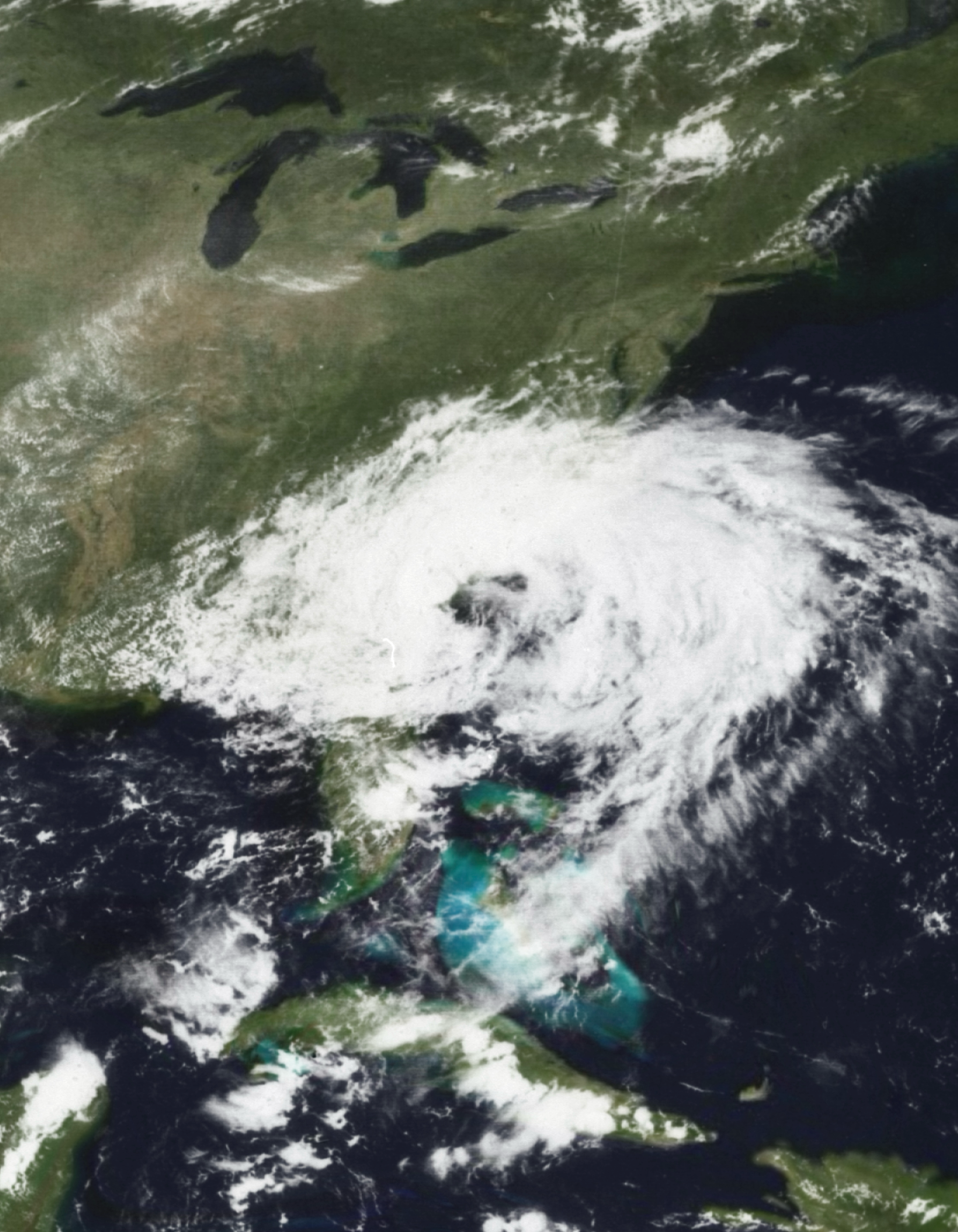
- Duration: August 18 – August 21
- Peak intensity: 50 mph (85 km/h) (1-min); 996 mbar (hPa)

An area of low pressure in the southeastern Gulf of Mexico developed into a tropical depression early on August 18. The depression drifted east and northeastward over the next day, before beginning to accelerate on August 19. The cyclone further intensified into Tropical Storm Dottie by 12:00 UTC. Shortly thereafter, Dottie made landfall in Florida over mainland Monroe County. The cyclone quickly proceeded northeastward before re-emerging into the Atlantic near Palm Beach. Dottie moved northward and peaked with winds of 50 mph (85 km/h) at 06:00 UTC on August 20, before subsequently weakening due to wind shear. By the time Dottie made landfall in Charleston, South Carolina, early on August 21, it was barely of tropical storm intensity. It deteriorated into a tropical depression on August 21 and dissipated shortly thereafter. The remnant low pressure system turned southward and once again entered the Atlantic before turning westward and crossing the Florida peninsula.

Dottie dropped heavy rainfall in South Florida, with a peak total of 10.86 in (276 mm). However, impact from the precipitation was mainly limited to street flooding in several cities, which delayed the commute of thousands of motorists during morning rush hour traffic, especially in Miami. Tropical storm force wind gusts damaged a roof in Marathon, downed some trees, and disrupted electricity in at least 20 neighborhoods, though wind damage overall was minor. In the Bahamas, a fishing boat capsized near Grand Bahama, drowning four of its occupants. Rainfall was generally light in the Carolinas, though 7.78 in (198 mm) of precipitation fell in Carolina Beach, North Carolina, flooding some areas of the city with up to 5 ft (1.5 m) of water. However, rainfall was mostly beneficial due to a severe drought. Beach erosion occurred due to tides reaching 3.5 ft (1.1 m) normal at Atlantic Beach.

=== Hurricane Candice ===
- Category 1 hurricane (SSHWS)
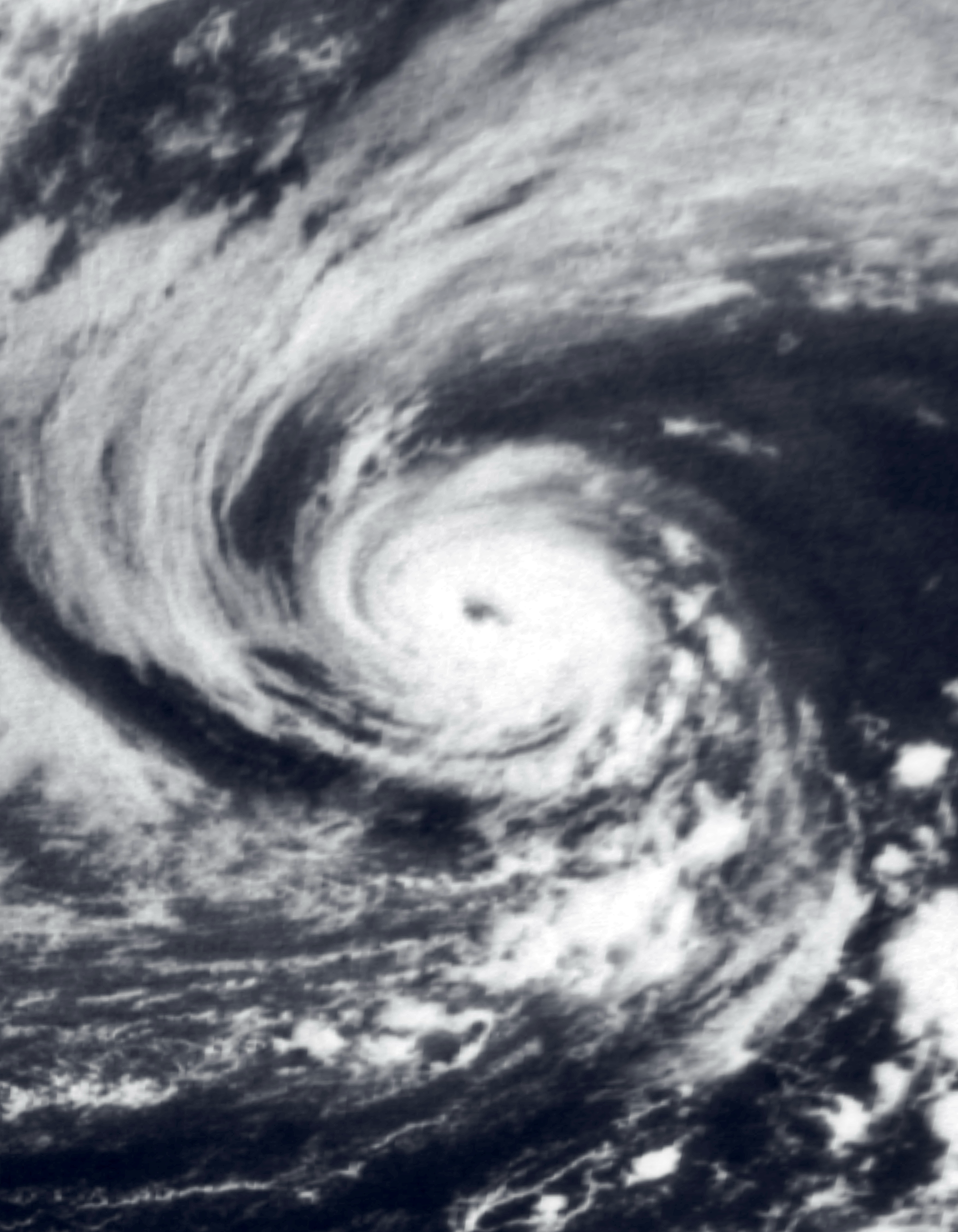
- Duration: August 18 – August 24
- Peak intensity: 90 mph (150 km/h) (1-min); 964 mbar (hPa)

On August 11, a cold-core low was located south of Bermuda. Over the next week, the system warmed and moved toward the surface. Around 12:00 UTC on August 18, the low developed into a tropical depression about 200 mi (320 km) west-southwest of the island, after satellite imagery showed better organization and a ship reporting winds gusting to 46 mph (74 km/h). Moving fairly quickly to the north-northeast, the depression intensified into Tropical Storm Candice about six hours later. Candice curved east-northeastward early on August 20 and weakened slightly, before re-strengthening later that day. By 06:00 UTC on August 20, the cyclone intensified into a hurricane. Becoming a hurricane at 41.2°N, Candice was one of few Atlantic tropical storms to intensify into a hurricane while situated north of 40°N. Around that time, Candice had decelerated and briefly turned to the southeast, before pivoting northeastward on August 21. Candice continued to intensify, peaking with sustained winds of 90 mph (150 km/h) and a minimum pressure of 964 mbar (28.5 inHg) later on the following day. The hurricane then accelerated due to an approaching cold front, before merging with the front about 475 mi (765 km) east of Newfoundland at 12:00 UTC on August 24.

=== Hurricane Emmy ===
- Category 2 hurricane (SSHWS)
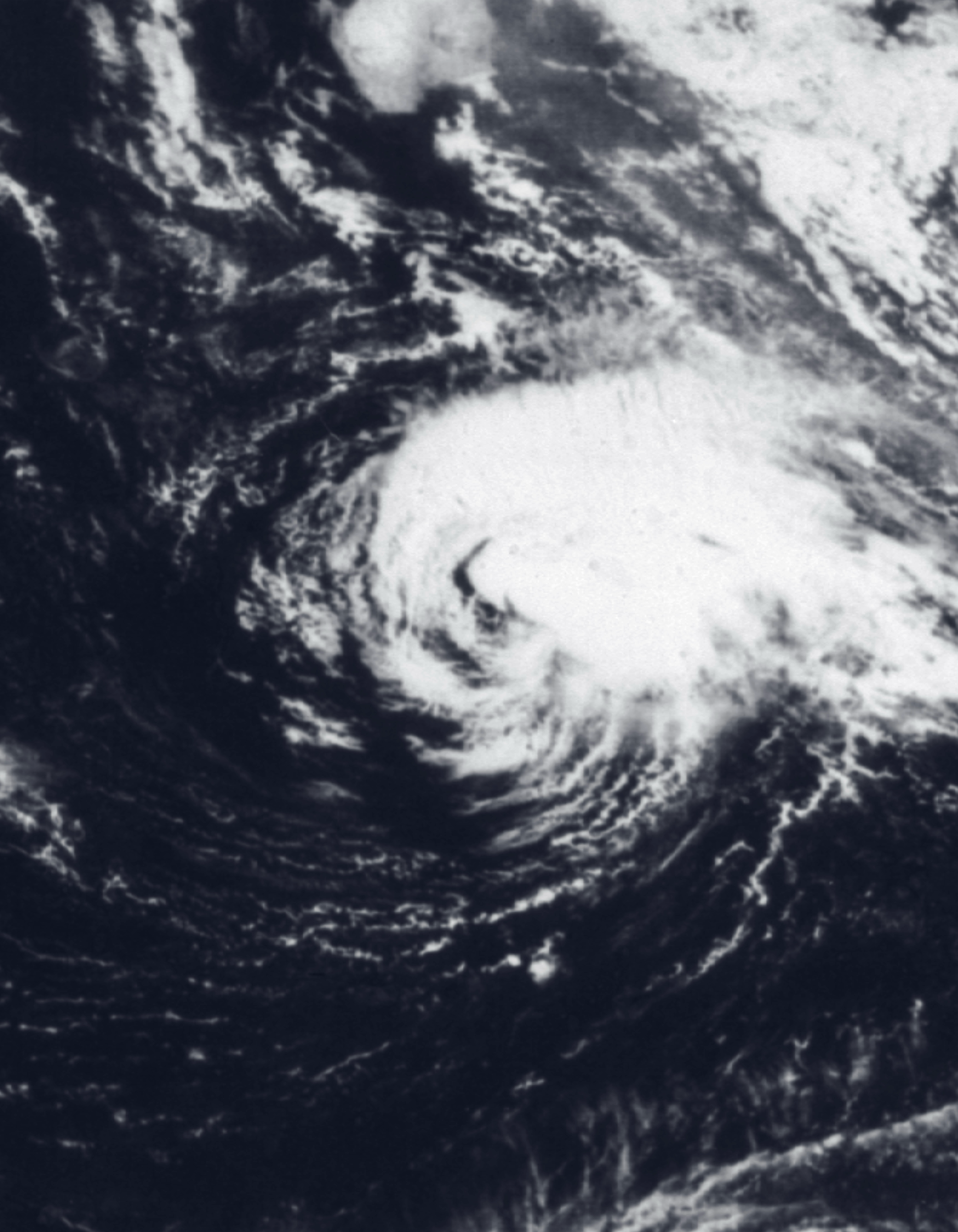
- Duration: August 20 – September 4
- Peak intensity: 105 mph (165 km/h) (1-min); 974 mbar (hPa)

A tropical wave moved off the coast of Africa between August 15 and August 16. The wave moved westward at 15 to 20 mph (24 to 32 km/h), and developed atmospheric convection along the wave axis. It slowly organized, developing a low-level circulation, and formed into a tropical depression on August 20 while located about 775 miles (1,247 km) east of Barbados. A reconnaissance aircraft flight into the system on August 21 confirmed the existence of a depression, which reported winds of only 23 mph (37 km/h) with a pressure of 1,012 mbar. The depression slowly strengthened and organized, and after turning to the west-northwest, it intensified into Tropical Storm Emmy on August 22 while located 370 miles (600 km) east-northeast of Guadeloupe. Tropical Storm Emmy turned more to the northwest, and passed about 135 miles (217 km) northeast of Barbuda on August 23. The rapid development of an unseasonable frontal low pressure system to the northeast of the storm turned Emmy sharply east-northeastward on August 25. Its eastward movement at such a low latitude for the time of year was unprecedented. The storm steadily intensified and Emmy attained hurricane status later on the 25th while located 270 miles (430 km) north of Barbuda. After moving eastward for about 24 hours, the Westerlies retreated northward, and Emmy turned gradually to the northwest. A strong ridge over the north Atlantic Ocean turned Emmy sharply eastward on August 29. The hurricane continued to strengthen, and Emmy attained a peak intensity of 105 mph (169 km/h) shortly after turning to the east while located 500 miles (800 km) northeast of Bermuda. The hurricane maintained its peak intensity for 42 hours while moving eastward at 17 mph (27 km/h), and slowly weakened after peaking in strength. On September 1, Emmy turned to the east-southeast, and a day later it turned to the northeast as its forward motion decreased. Emmy passed through the Azores on September 3, and the following day it became extratropical to the north of the islands. The extratropical remnant persisted another six hours before being absorbed by approaching Hurricane Frances.

Initially, the path of Emmy was uncertain whether it would affect the Lesser Antilles. As a result, officials issued a hurricane watch for the northeastern Leeward Islands. The warning was cancelled when the storm turned more to the north, with the outer fringes of the hurricane slightly impacting Antigua. Two days before Emmy passed through the Azores, the National Hurricane Center advised citizens there to closely monitor the progress of the storm. On September 3, a C-130 Hercules air force flight left Caracas, Venezuela, for Spain, with a flight crew of 10 and 58 members of the Central University of Venezuela choir. That night, heavy rainfall from the hurricane forced the plane to land on the Azores island of Terceira Island, Portugal. After attempting twice to land in hurricane-force winds, the plane crashed in a hill one mile from the runway of Lajes Field, killing all 68 onboard.

=== Hurricane Frances ===
- Category 3 hurricane (SSHWS)
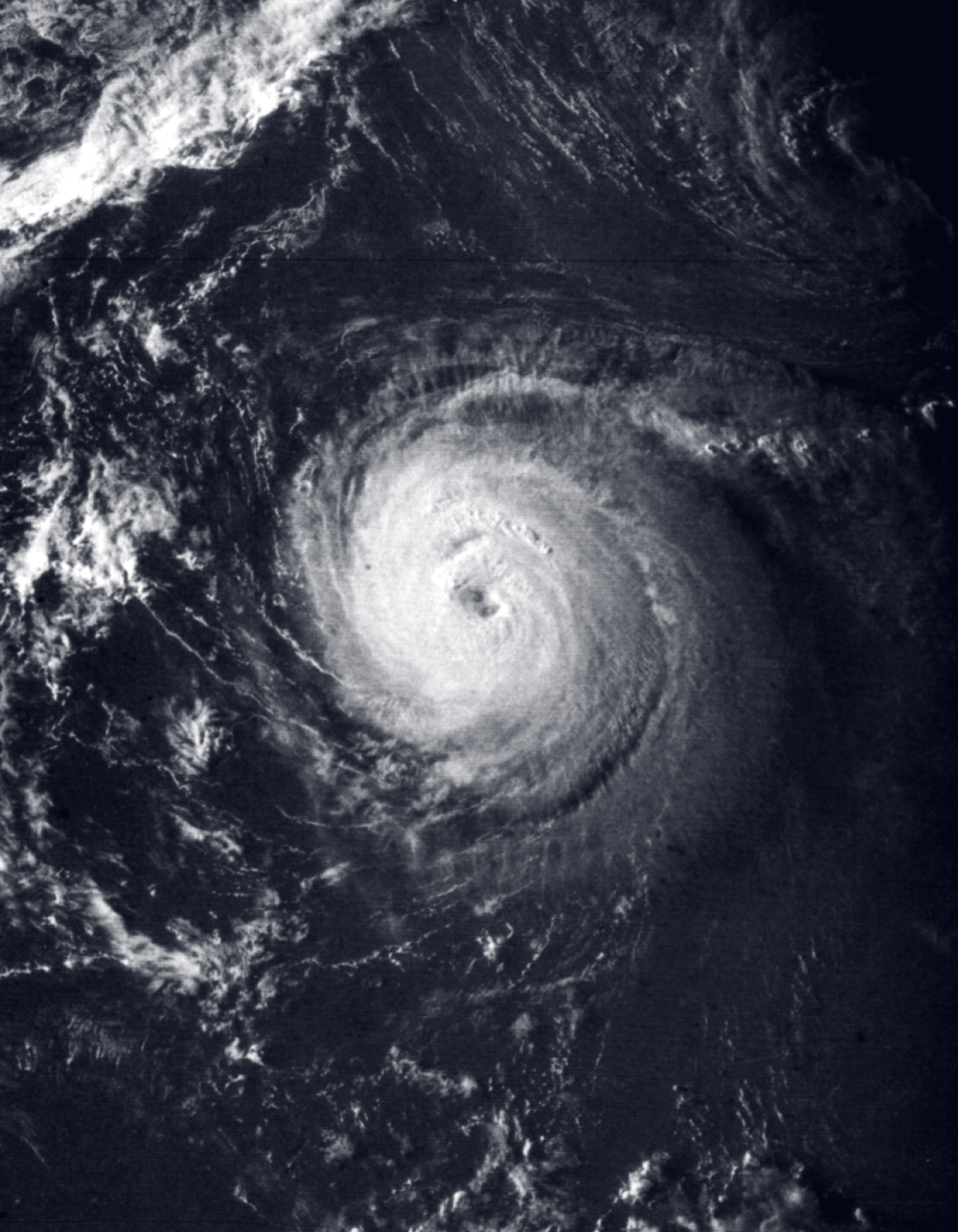
- Duration: August 27 – September 4
- Peak intensity: 115 mph (185 km/h) (1-min); 963 mbar (hPa)

A tropical wave emerged into the Atlantic from the west coast of Africa on August 24. After moving westward for three days, the system developed into a tropical depression about 860 mi (1,380 km) west-southwest of the southwesternmost Cape Verde Islands. A reconnaissance aircraft flight into the storm on August 28 recorded winds of 58 mph (93 km/h) and a barometric pressure of 1,002 mbar (29.6 inHg), which resulted in the cyclone being upgraded to Tropical Storm Frances. The storm began curving northwestward due to a weakness in the Azores High caused by the recent passage of Hurricane Emmy. By early on August 30, Frances intensified into a hurricane. About 24 hours later, the cyclone turned northward well northeast of the Lesser Antilles. Strengthening further, Frances peaked as a Category 3 hurricane at 06:00 UTC on September 1, with reconnaissance measuring sustained winds of 115 mph (185 km/h) and a minimum barometric pressure of 963 mbar (28.4 inHg).

Frances almost immediately began weakening thereafter, falling to Category 2 intensity by midday on September 1. The weakness in the Azores High continued to influence the storm's path, causing Frances to recurve to the east around that time. A slower weakening trend commenced, with the storm being downgraded to a Category 1 on September 3. After curving northeastward, Frances began losing tropical characteristics while approaching the Azores. The transition to an extratropical cyclone was fully completed at 12:00 UTC on September 4, with Frances centered about 345 mi (555 km) south-southwest of Flores Island in the Azores. The extratropical remnants passed through the Azores and completed a counterclockwise loop north of the islands before dissipating on September 7.

=== Subtropical Storm Three ===
- Subtropical storm (SSHWS)
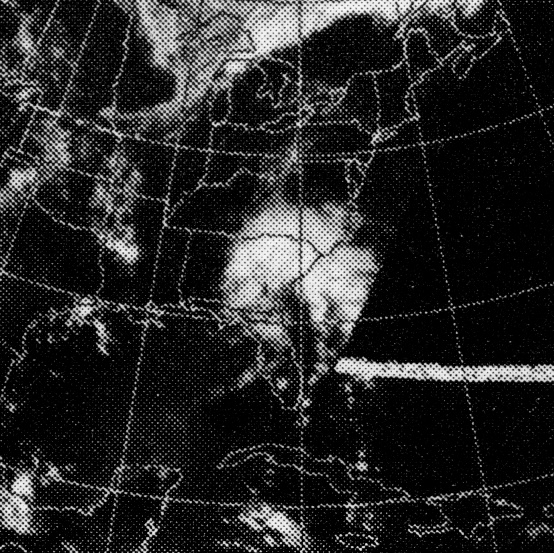
- Duration: September 13 – September 17
- Peak intensity: 45 mph (75 km/h) (1-min); 1011 mbar (hPa)

On September 12, the interaction between mid-tropospheric low and a diffuse stationary front led to the formation of a low pressure system over central Florida. As it moved north-northeastward, a circulation formed, resulting in the development of a subtropical depression over Polk County, Florida, on September 13. The next day, it intensified into a subtropical storm and peaked with maximum sustained winds of 45 mph (75 km/h) while just off the coast of Georgia. The storm quickly made landfall near the mouth of the Savannah river, at the same intensity. After moving inland, the cyclone weakened to a subtropical depression late on September 15 near the North Carolina–South Carolina state line. The storm dissipated over southern Virginia on September 17.

Tides produced by the storm ranged from 2–3 ft (0.61–0.91 m) above normal along the coast of the Carolinas, leaving minor beach erosion. The storm produced wind gusts up to 58 mph (93 km/h) in Charleston, South Carolina. Rain fell in several states along the East Coast of the United States and was generally beneficial. However, in central and southern Maryland, where the storm dropped a peak total of 6.45 in (164 mm) of precipitation in Towson, downpours resulted in flooding. The Baltimore area received its highest amount of rainfall for any day in the month of September. Heavy precipitation delayed commutes, while water entered some homes, flooded roads, and resulted in a few school closures.

=== Hurricane Gloria ===
- Category 2 hurricane (SSHWS)
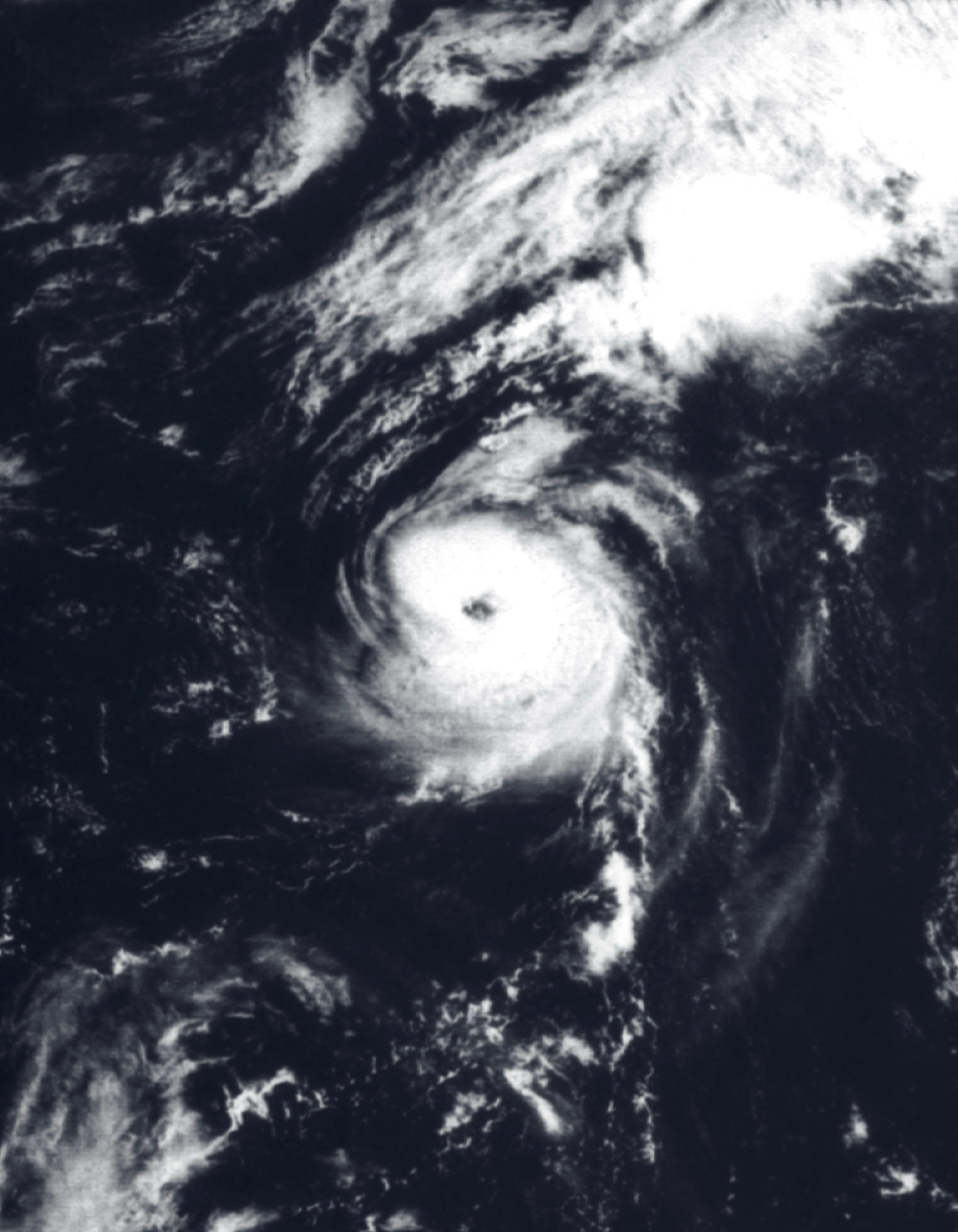
- Duration: September 26 – October 4
- Peak intensity: 105 mph (165 km/h) (1-min); 970 mbar (hPa)

On September 18, a tropical wave entered the Atlantic from the west coast of Africa. While the wave moved west-northwestward at about 12 mph (19 km/h), an upper-tropospheric cold low pressure interacted with and later merged with the system, causing cloud features to become better organized by September 23. After three days, the low-level circulation became well-defined, resulting in the development of a tropical depression about 400 mi (640 km) northeast of the Lesser Antilles. The depression moved slowly northward and intensified into Tropical Storm Gloria at 12:00 UTC on September 27. Early the following day, Gloria began moving northwestward. By 06:00 UTC on September 29, the cyclone intensified into a hurricane and became a Category 2 hurricane about 24 hours later. Gloria peaked with maximum sustained winds of 105 mph (165 km/h) and a minimum barometric pressure of 970 mbar (29 inHg) at 12:00 UTC on September 30, based on reconnaissance observations and satellite imagery.

Beginning on September 30, the hurricane tracked northeastward and then east-northward due to a multiple short-wave troughs crossing Atlantic Canada and moving into the Atlantic. Gloria slowly leveled off in intensity, weakening to a Category 1 hurricane at 12:00 UTC on October 1. Early the next day, the storm fell to tropical storm status. After a jog to the east-southeast on October 3, Gloria resumed its east-northeasterly motion on October 4. Around that time, the cyclone weakened to a tropical depression. Gloria also began losing tropical characteristics and became extratropical about 200 mi (320 km) west-southwest of the northwesternmost islands of the Azores at 00:00 UTC on October 5.

=== Hurricane Holly ===
- Category 1 hurricane (SSHWS)
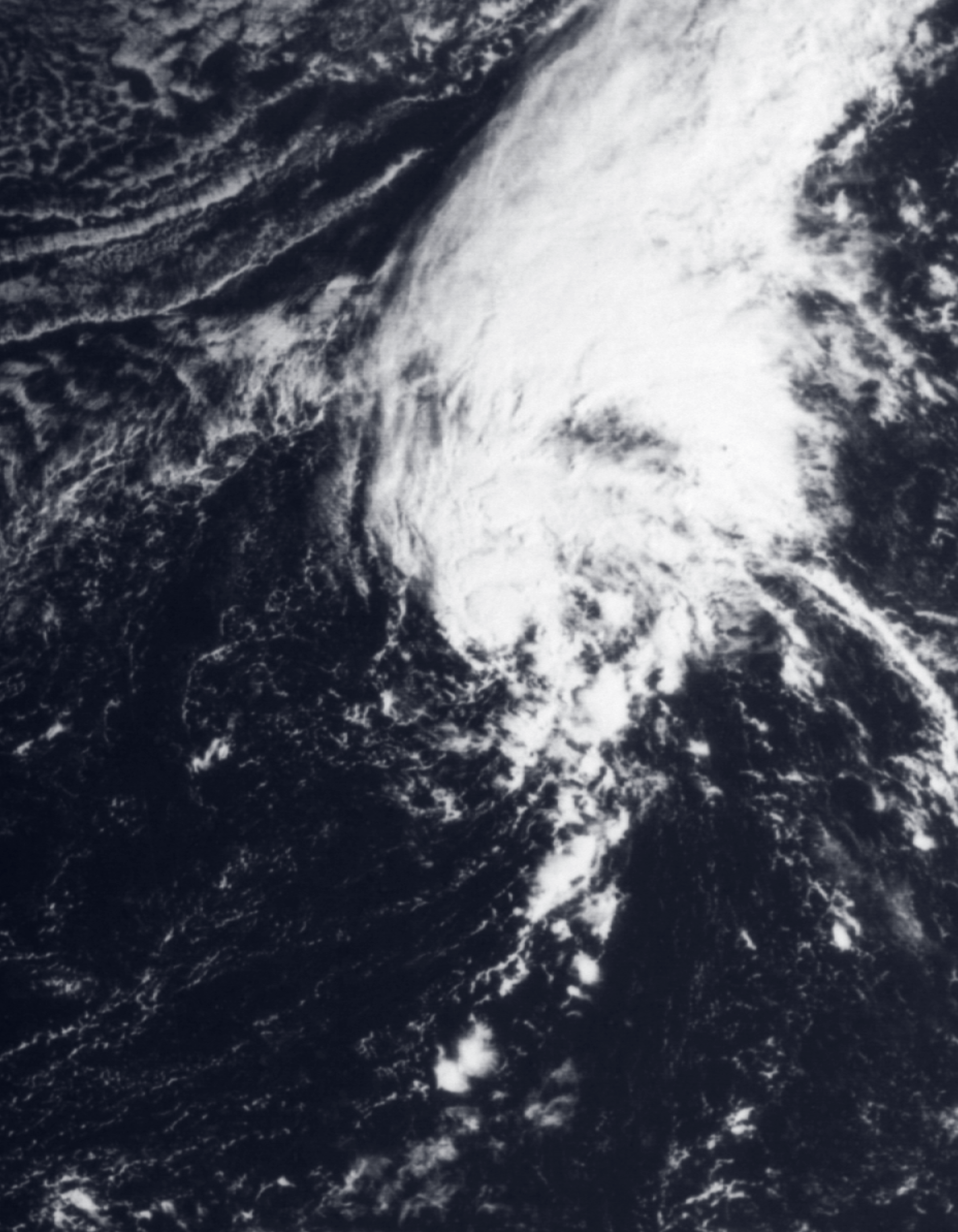
- Duration: October 22 – October 28
- Peak intensity: 75 mph (120 km/h) (1-min); 990 mbar (hPa)

A tropical wave emerged from the west coast of Africa on October 14. The wave initially remained relatively weak, until convection began concentrating near the center while it was situated well east of the Lesser Antilles on October 20. After further organization, a tropical depression developed at 18:00 UTC on October 22 roughly 405 mi (650 km) east-northeast of the Leeward Islands. The depression moved north-northwestward and strengthened into Tropical Storm Holly about 24 hours later. Shortly thereafter, the storm curved north-northeastward and intensified at a faster pace. At 12:00 UTC on October 24, Holly became a Category 1 hurricane and peaked with maximum sustained winds of 75 mph (120 km/h) and a minimum barometric pressure of 990 mbar (29 inHg). However, the system weakened back to a tropical storm about 24 hours later due to interaction with an upper trough. Early on October 27, Holly began accelerating northeastward ahead of a cold front. The storm merged with the cold front late on October 28 about 400 mi (640 km) northwest of the Azores. The remnants quickly became indistinguishable.

=== Other systems ===
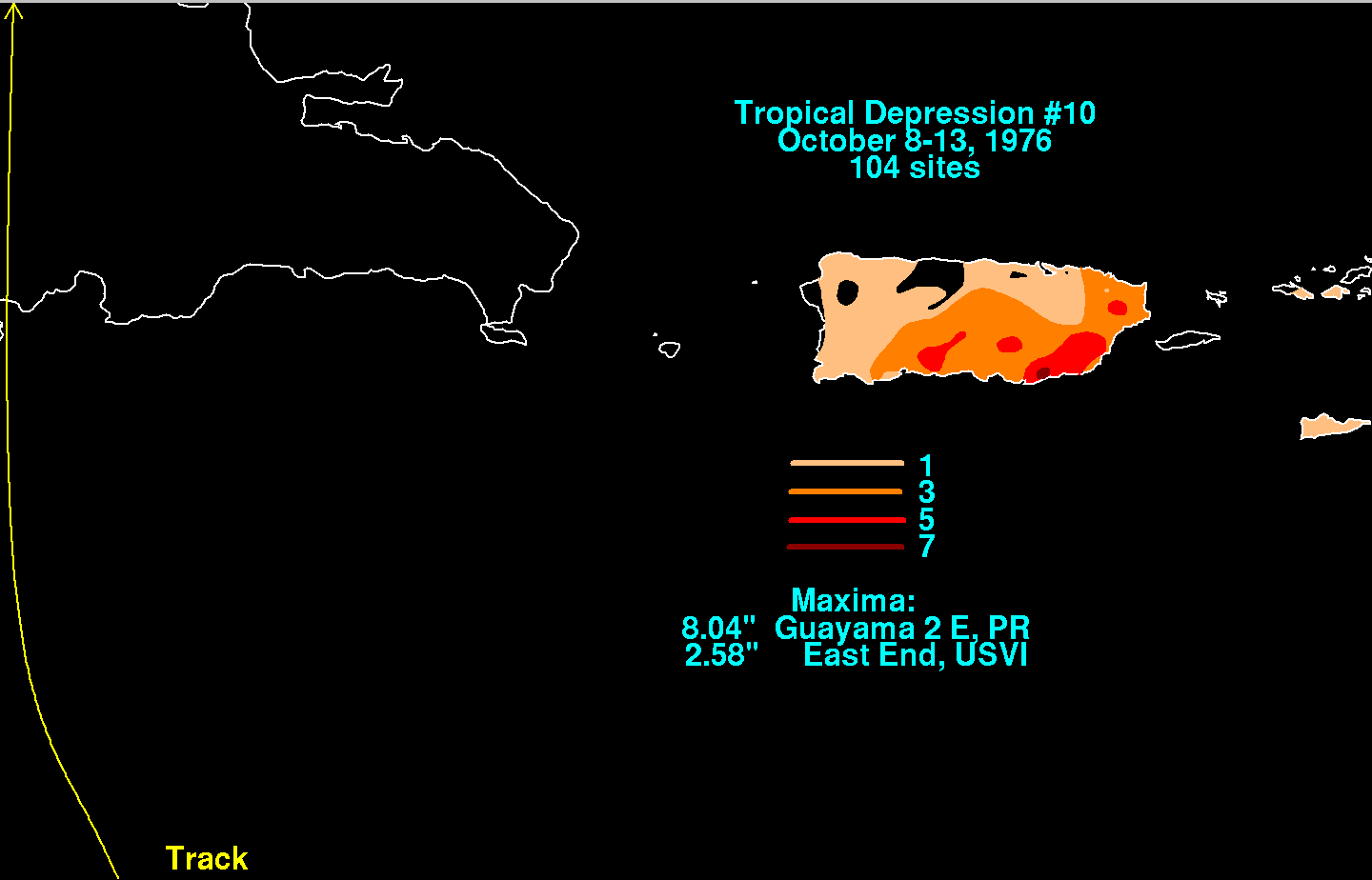
Rainfall accumulations from Tropical Depression Ten in Puerto Rico

Throughout the 1976 season, there were 11 tropical depressions monitored that did not achieve gale intensity. The first such system developed just north of Grand Bahama in the Bahamas on June 7. Moving north-northeastward for much of its duration, the depression strengthened slightly to reach winds of 35 mph (55 km/h). However, it failed to become a tropical storm before weakening and dissipating about 155 mi (250 km) south of Nantucket island in Massachusetts on June 9. Two days after the previous depression dissipated, another tropical depression formed over Hendry County, Florida. Light rainfall was recorded in West Palm Beach, while several waterspouts were reported in Lake Okeechobee near Clewiston. The depression moved northeastward and quickly emerged into the Atlantic. About 30 hours after developing, the depression dissipated approximately 310 mi (500 km) northwest of Bermuda on June 12. Activity in the Atlantic then ceased for more than a month, until a tropical depression formed about 355 mi (570 km) southeast of Cape Hatteras in North Carolina on July 20. The depression moved north-northwestward, before turning northeastward on the following day. It dissipated about halfway between Cape Hatteras and Bermuda on July 22. The next depression formed about 300 mi (480 km) south of the Cape Verde Islands on July 23. Trekking just south of due west, the cyclone was short-lived and dissipated by the following day.

As hurricanes Emmy and Frances were becoming extratropical, another tropical depression formed offshore the Carolinas on September 4. The depression moved parallel to the coast and intensified slightly. However, it dissipated roughly halfway between Cape Hatteras and Bermuda on September 6. The next depression developed over the eastern Gulf of Mexico on September 5. After initially moving northwestward, the cyclone curved westward about 24 hours later. On September 7, the depression dissipated just south of the mouth of the Mississippi River. Another depression formed near the Cape Verde Islands on September 20. Moving generally northwestward for several days, the depression strengthened slightly, but not enough to be upgraded to a tropical storm. By September 25, the depression recurved northeastward. Two days later, it dissipated over the central Atlantic. A depression then developed near the middle of the Gulf of Mexico on September 22. Tracking northward, the depression made landfall in southeastern Louisiana with winds of 30 mph (45 km/h) late on September 24, before quickly dissipating over Mississippi. The next depression formed over the deep tropics on September 26. Failing to intensify significantly, the depression dissipated about two days later. The next system, classified as Tropical Depression Ten, formed about halfway between the coast of Africa and the Lesser Antilles on October 3. After initially trekking west-northwestward for a few days, it turned southwestward on October 5. The depression crossed the Lesser Antilles early on October 8, passing between Saint Lucia and Saint Vincent. Continuing westward over the Caribbean, the storm slowly curved northward by October 9. Early on October 12, the depression made landfall near Barahona, Dominican Republic, with winds of 30 mph (45 km/h). Later that day, it dissipated off the north coast of Dominican Republic near Luperón. The depression brought heavy rainfall to parts of Puerto Rico, with a peak total of 8.04 in (204 mm) near Guayama. The last non-intensifying tropical depression developed about halfway between Puerto Rico and the west coast of Africa on October 12. The system initially moved northwestward, but curved northeastward after two days. It dissipated over the central Atlantic by October 15.

== Storm names ==
The following list of names was used for named storms that formed in the north Atlantic in 1976. Storms were named Belle, Candice, Dottie, Emmy, and Gloria for the first time in 1976. The names Anna, Frances, and Holly had previously been used on the old naming lists. No names were retired following the season; however, an overhaul of the naming system in 1979 to include male names resulted in this list being discarded.

- Anna
- Belle
- Candice
- Dottie
- Emmy
- Frances
- Gloria
- Holly
- Inga (unused)
- Jill (unused)
- Kay (unused)
- Lilias (unused)
- Maria (unused)
- Nola (unused)
- Orpha (unused)
- Pamela (unused)
- Ruth (unused)
- Shirley (unused)
- Trixie (unused)
- Vilda (unused)
- Wynne (unused)

== Season effects ==
This is a table of all of the storms that formed in the 1976 Atlantic hurricane season. It includes their name, duration, peak classification and intensities, areas affected, damage, and death totals. Deaths in parentheses are additional and indirect (an example of an indirect death would be a traffic accident), but were still related to that storm. Damage and deaths include totals while the storm was extratropical, a wave, or a low, and all of the damage figures are in 1976 USD.

Saffir–Simpson scale
TD	TS	C1	C2	C3	C4	C5

1976 North Atlantic tropical cyclone season statistics
Storm name	Dates active	Storm category at peak intensity	Max 1-min wind mph (km/h)	Min. press. (mbar)	Areas affected	Damage (US$)	Deaths	Ref(s).
One	May 21 – 25	Subtropical storm	50 (85)	994	Southeastern United States	$628,000	None	
Depression	June 7 – 9	Tropical depression	35 (55)	N/A	None	None	None	
Depression	June 11 – 12	Tropical depression	35 (55)	N/A	Florida	None	None	
Depression	July 20 – 22	Tropical depression	30 (45)	N/A	None	None	None	
Depression	July 23 – 24	Tropical depression	30 (45)	N/A	None	None	None	
Anna	July 28 – August 1	Tropical storm	45 (75)	999	Azores	None	None	
Belle	August 6 – 10	Category 3 hurricane	120 (195)	957	North Carolina, Mid-Atlantic states, New England, Atlantic Canada	$101 million	3 (9)	
Dottie	August 18 – 21	Tropical storm	50 (85)	996	Southeastern United States, Bahamas	Minimal	4	
Candice	August 18 – 24	Category 1 hurricane	90 (150)	964	None	None	None	
Emmy	August 20 – September 4	Category 2 hurricane	105 (165)	974	Lesser Antilles, Azores	Minimal	(68)	
Frances	August 27 – September 4	Category 3 hurricane	115 (185)	963	Azores	None	None	
Depression	September 4 – 6	Tropical depression	30 (45)	N/A	None	None	None	
Depression	September 5 – 7	Tropical depression	30 (45)	N/A	None	None	None	
Three	September 13 – 17	Subtropical storm	50 (85)	1011	Southeastern United States	None	None	
Depression	September 20 – 27	Tropical depression	35 (55)	N/A	None	None	None	
Depression	September 22 – 24	Tropical depression	30 (45)	N/A	None	None	None	
Gloria	September 26 – October 4	Category 2 hurricane	105 (165)	970	None	None	None	
Depression	September 26 – 28	Tropical depression	35 (55)	N/A	None	None	None	
Ten	October 3 – 12	Tropical depression	35 (55)	N/A	Lesser Antilles, Hispaniola, Puerto Rico	None	None	
Depression	October 12 – 15	Tropical depression	35 (55)	N/A	None	None	None	
Holly	October 22 – 28	Category 1 hurricane	75 (120)	990	None	None	None	
Season aggregates
21 systems	May 21 – October 29		120 (195)	957		$101.63 million	7 (77)	

== See also ==
- 1976 Pacific hurricane season
- 1976 Pacific typhoon season
- 1976 North Indian Ocean cyclone season
- Australian cyclone seasons: 1975–76, 1976–77
- South Pacific cyclone seasons: 1975–76, 1976–77
- South-West Indian Ocean cyclone seasons: 1975–76, 1976–77
- South Atlantic tropical cyclone
- Mediterranean tropical-like cyclone
