= 1975–76 South-West Indian Ocean cyclone season =

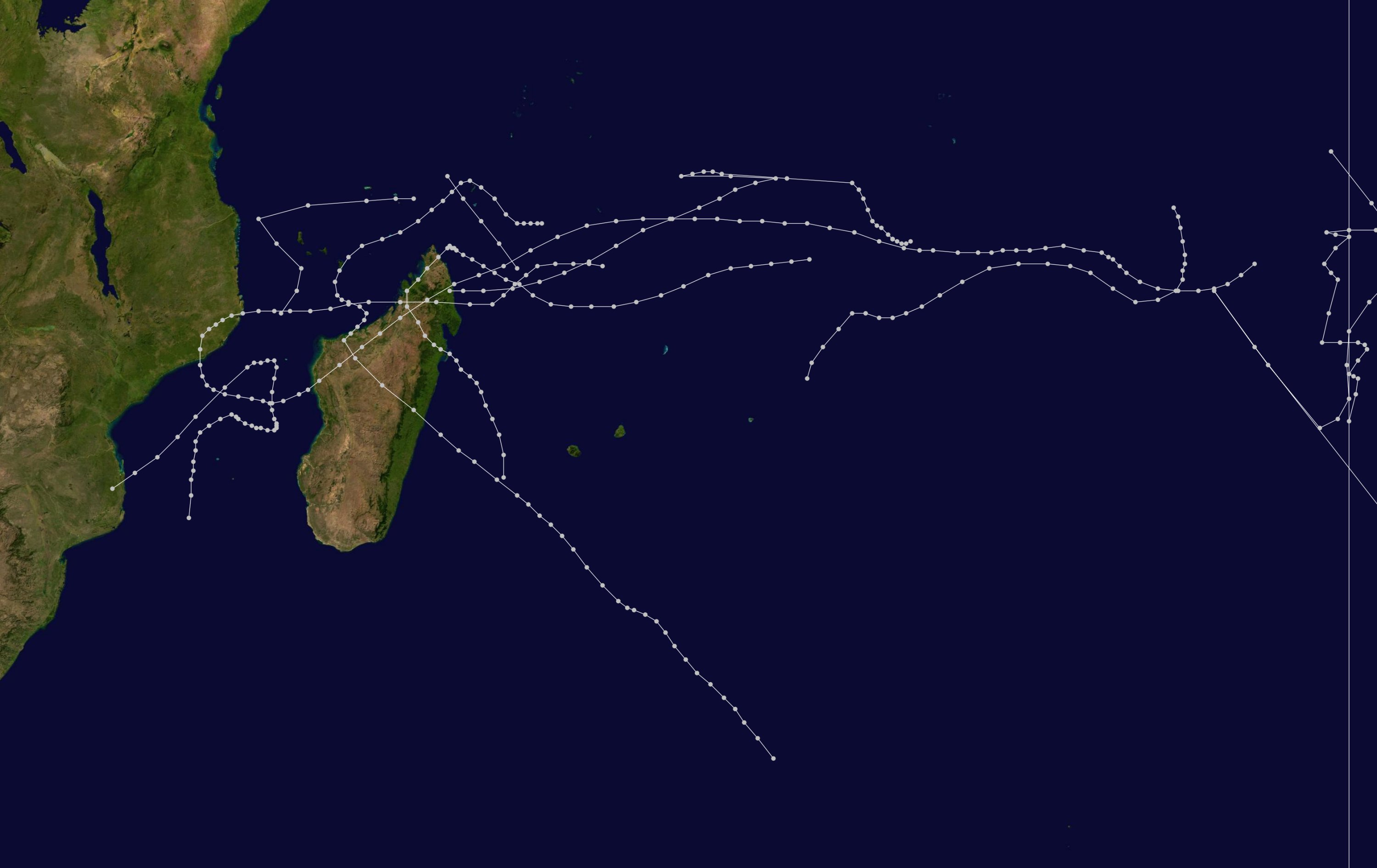
- Season summary map

Seasonal boundaries
- First system formed: 17 November 1975
- Last system dissipated: 12 April 1976

Strongest storm
- Name: Terry-Danae
  - Maximum winds: 175 km/h (110 mph) (10-minute sustained)
  - Lowest pressure: 964 hPa (mbar)

Seasonal statistics
- Total disturbances: 8
- Total depressions: 6 (record low, tied with 2010–11)
- Total storms: 6
- Tropical cyclones: 1
- Intense tropical cyclones: 1
- Total fatalities: Unknown
- Total damage: Unknown

Related articles
- 1975–76 Australian region cyclone season; 1975–76 South Pacific cyclone season

The 1975–76 South-West Indian Ocean cyclone season was a below-average cyclone season. The season officially ran from November 1, 1975, to April 30, 1976.

== Systems ==
=== Moderate Tropical Storm Audrey ===
- Moderate tropical storm (MFR)
- Tropical storm (SSHWS)
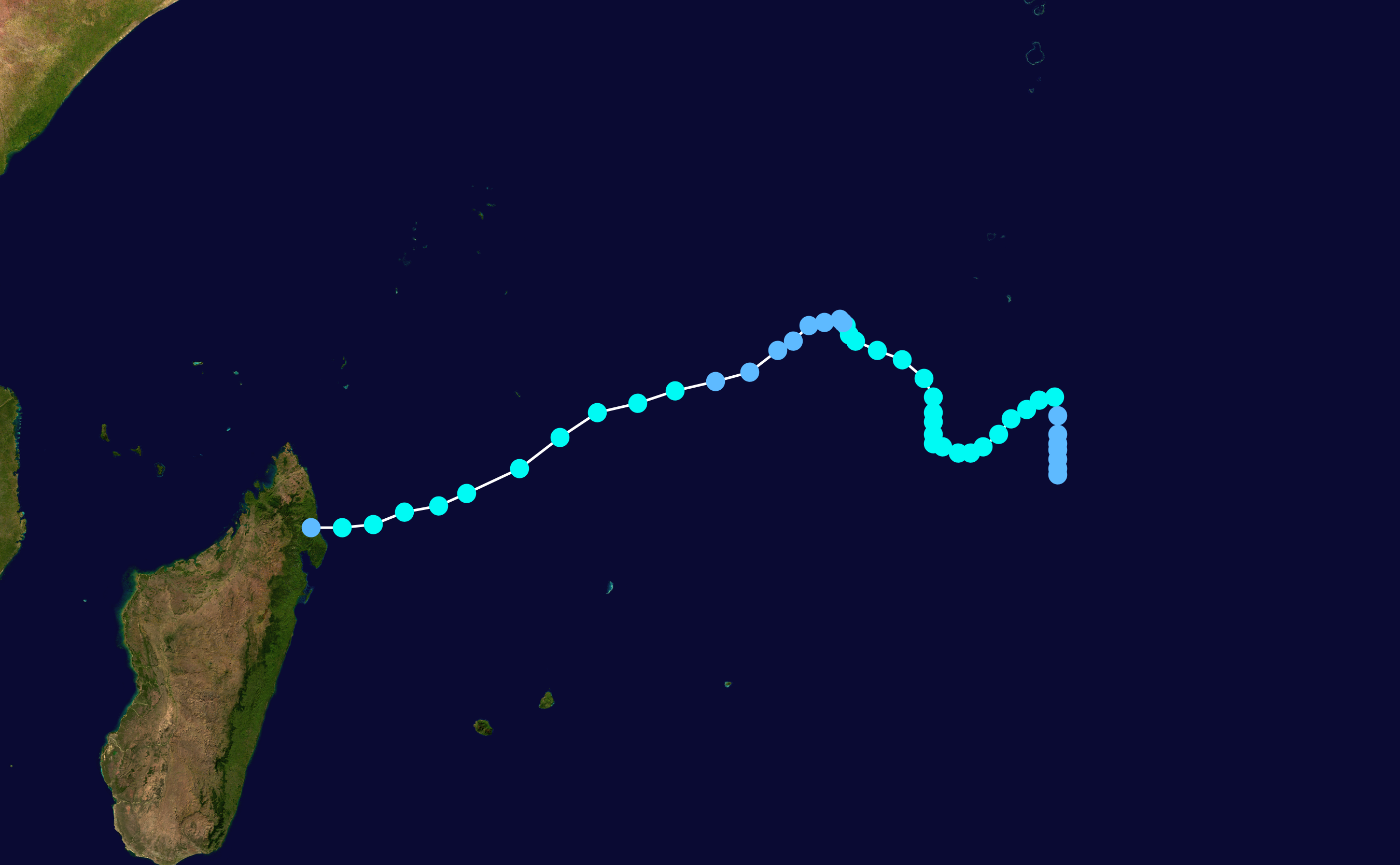
- Duration: November 17 – November 29
- Peak intensity: 85 km/h (50 mph) (10-min); 995 hPa (mbar)

Moderate Tropical Storm Audrey developed on November 17. Audrey struck Madagascar shortly before dissipating on November 29.

=== Tropical Cyclone Barbara ===
- Tropical cyclone (MFR)
- Category 1 tropical cyclone (SSHWS)
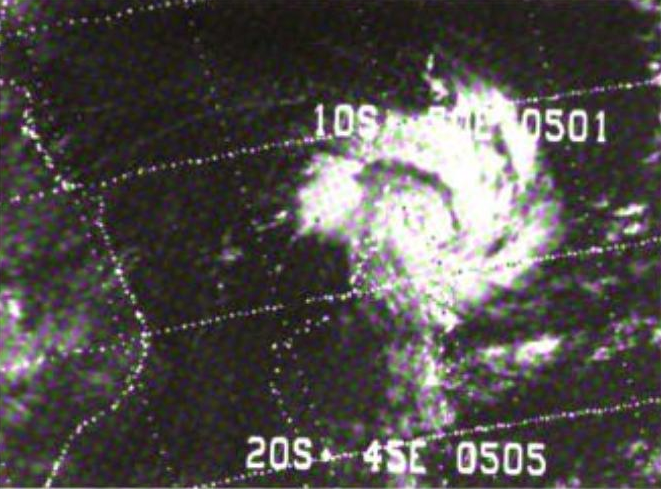
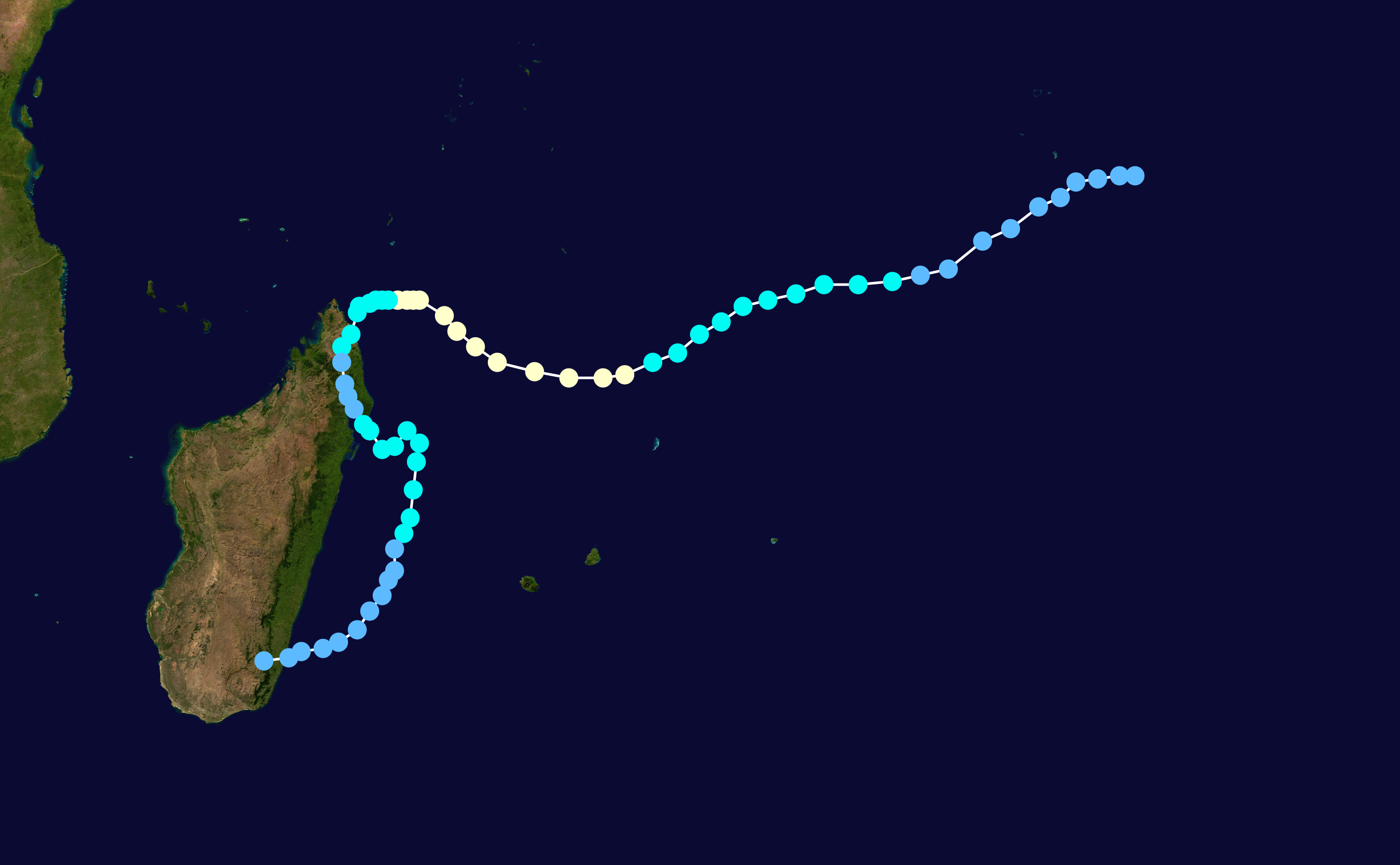
- Duration: December 3 – December 19
- Peak intensity: 150 km/h (90 mph) (10-min); 980 hPa (mbar)

Severe Tropical Storm Barbara developed on December 3. It made landfall in Madagascar twice before dissipating on December 19.

=== Very Intense Tropical Cyclone Clotilde ===
- Very intense tropical cyclone (MFR)
- Category 1 tropical cyclone (SSHWS)
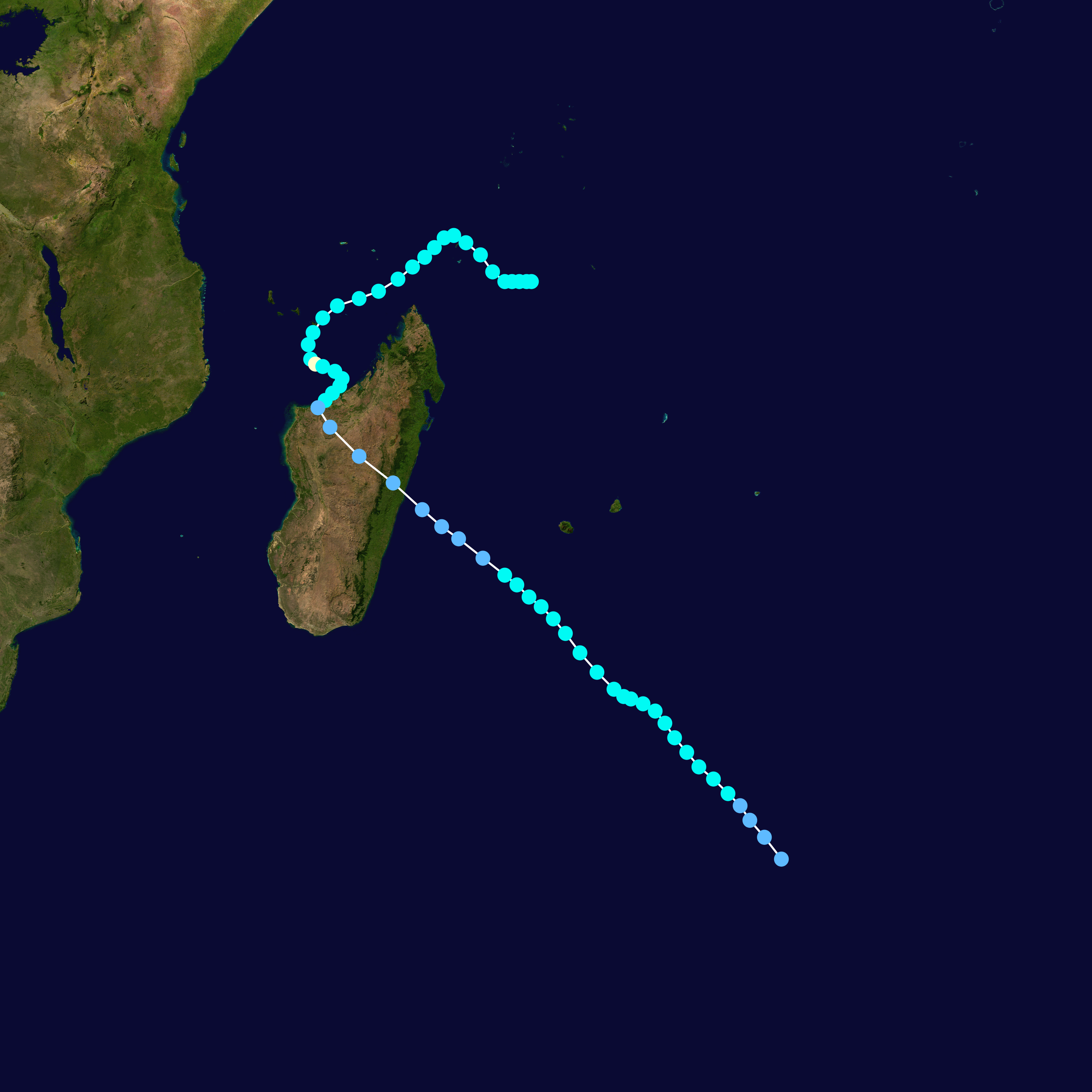
- Duration: January 7 – January 21
- Peak intensity: 250 km/h (155 mph) (10-min); 980 hPa (mbar)

Very Intense Tropical Cyclone Clotilde developed on January 7. It struck Madagascar and continued southeastward in the Indian Ocean before dissipating on January 21.

=== Very Intense Tropical Cyclone Terry–Danae ===
- Very intense tropical cyclone (MFR)
- Category 3 tropical cyclone (SSHWS)
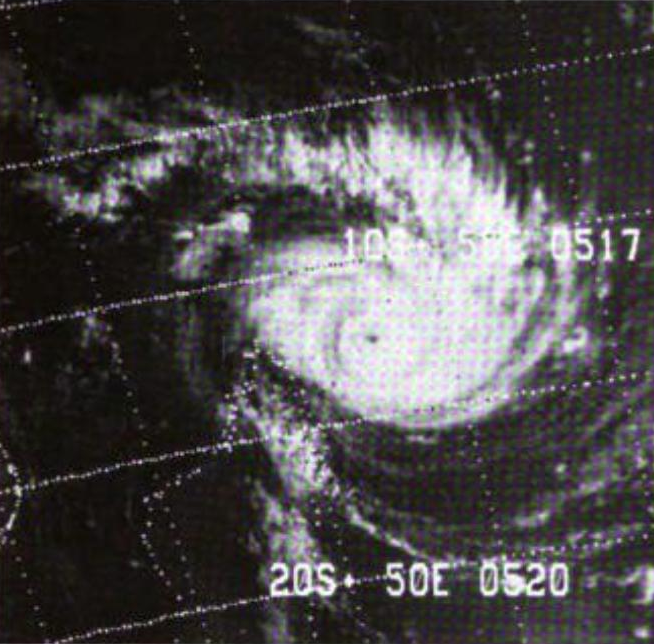
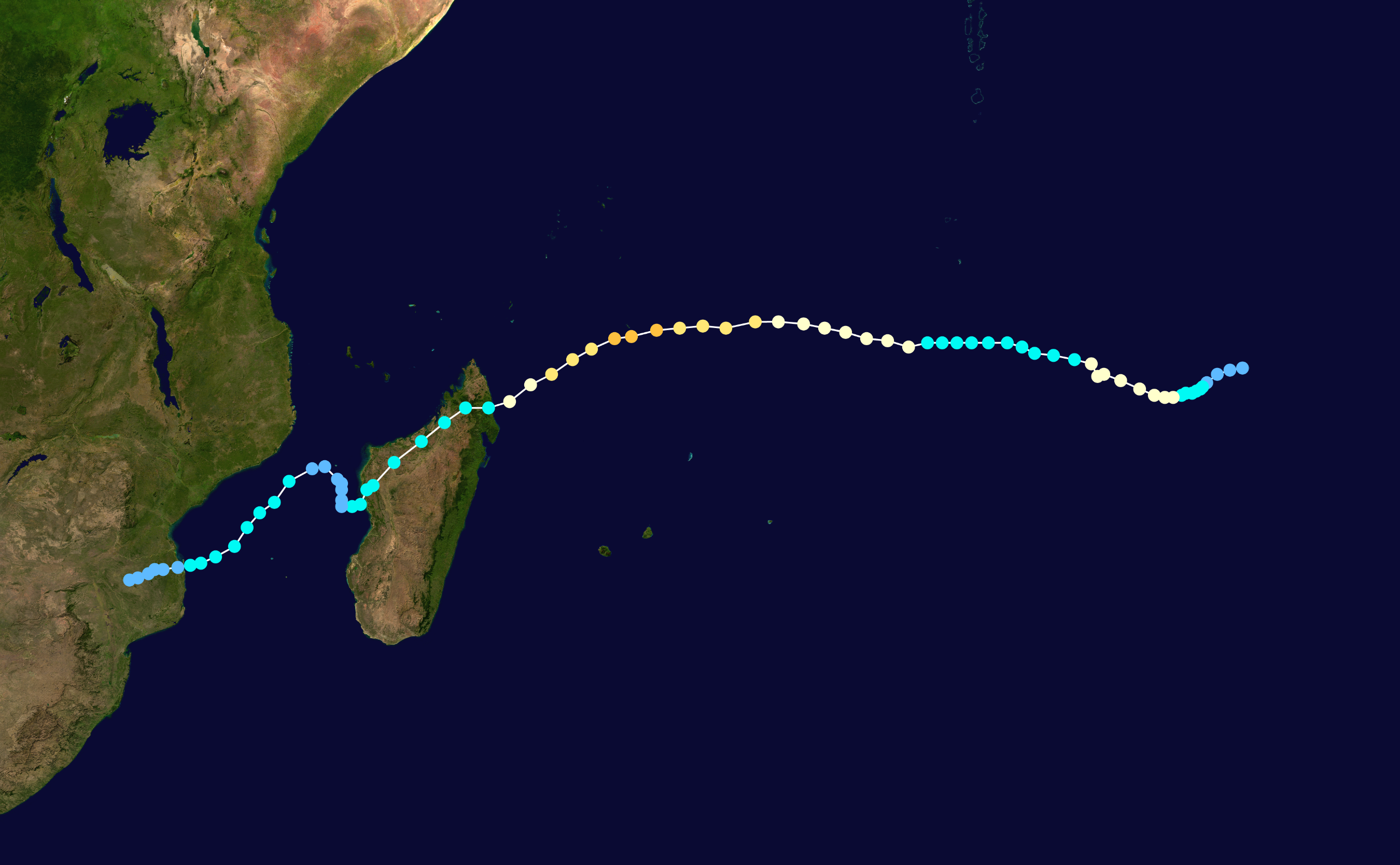
- Duration: January 10 – January 29
- Peak intensity: 260 km/h (160 mph) (10-min); 955 hPa (mbar)

Cyclone Danae first affected Agaléga, where the storm destroyed the wind gauge. Winds were estimated at over 240 km/h (150 mph). The storm also produced high waves that affected the northern coast of Réunion, flooding coastal roads. Cyclone Danae later struck Madagascar and then hit the east coast of Mozambique and South Africa in late January 1976. 50 people were killed in the flooding that resulted from the heavy rainfall of Cyclone Danae.

In South Africa, rainfall totals reached over 250 mm (9.8 in) in the northeastern portion of the country, which caused widespread river flooding.

=== Moderate Tropical Storm Ella ===
- Moderate tropical storm (MFR)
- Tropical depression (SSHWS)
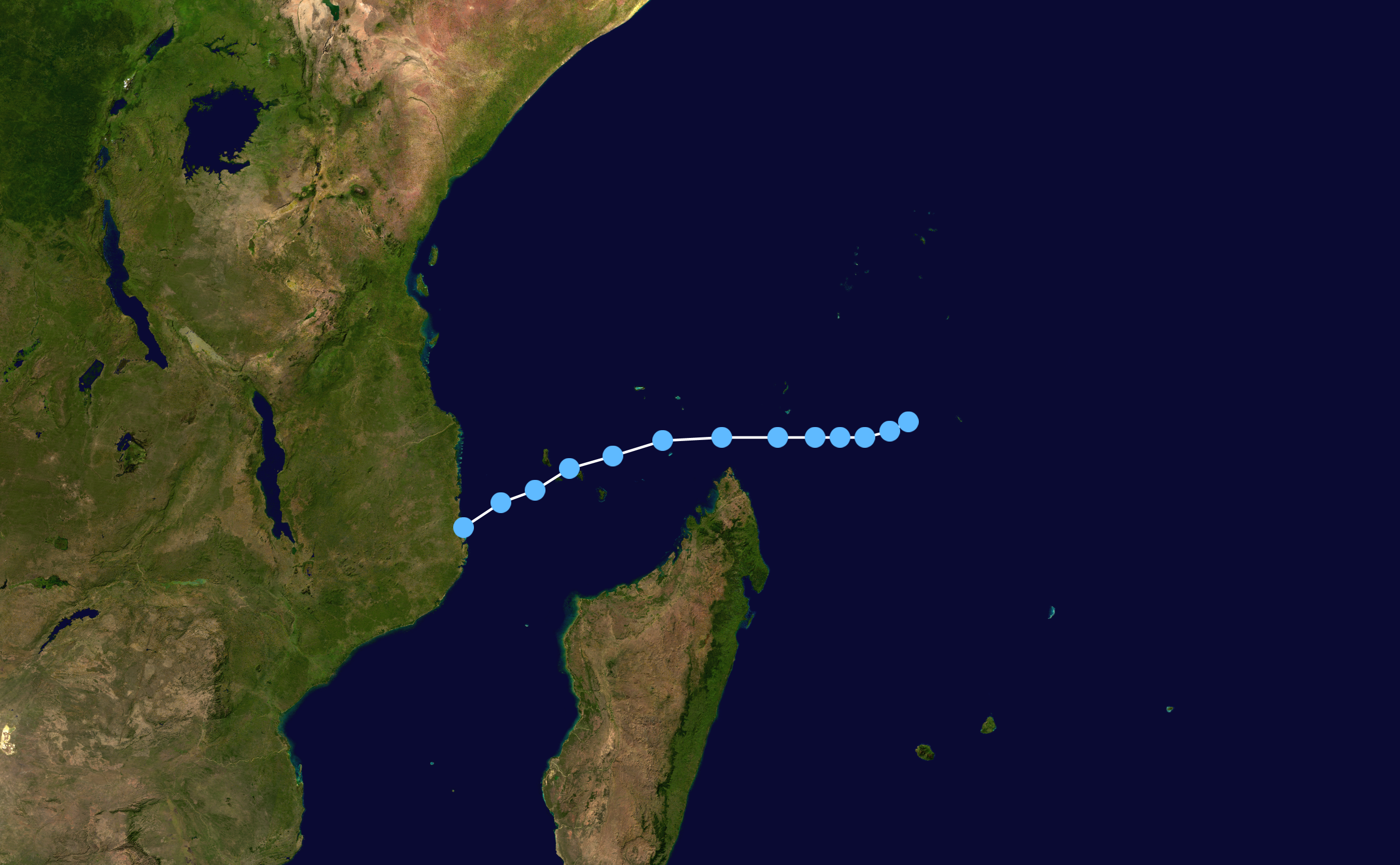
- Duration: March 9 – March 12
- Peak intensity: 75 km/h (45 mph) (10-min); 995 hPa (mbar)

Moderate Tropical Storm Ella developed on March 9. It struck Mozambique shortly before dissipating on March 12.

=== Moderate Tropical Storm Frederique ===
- Moderate tropical storm (MFR)
- Tropical depression (SSHWS)
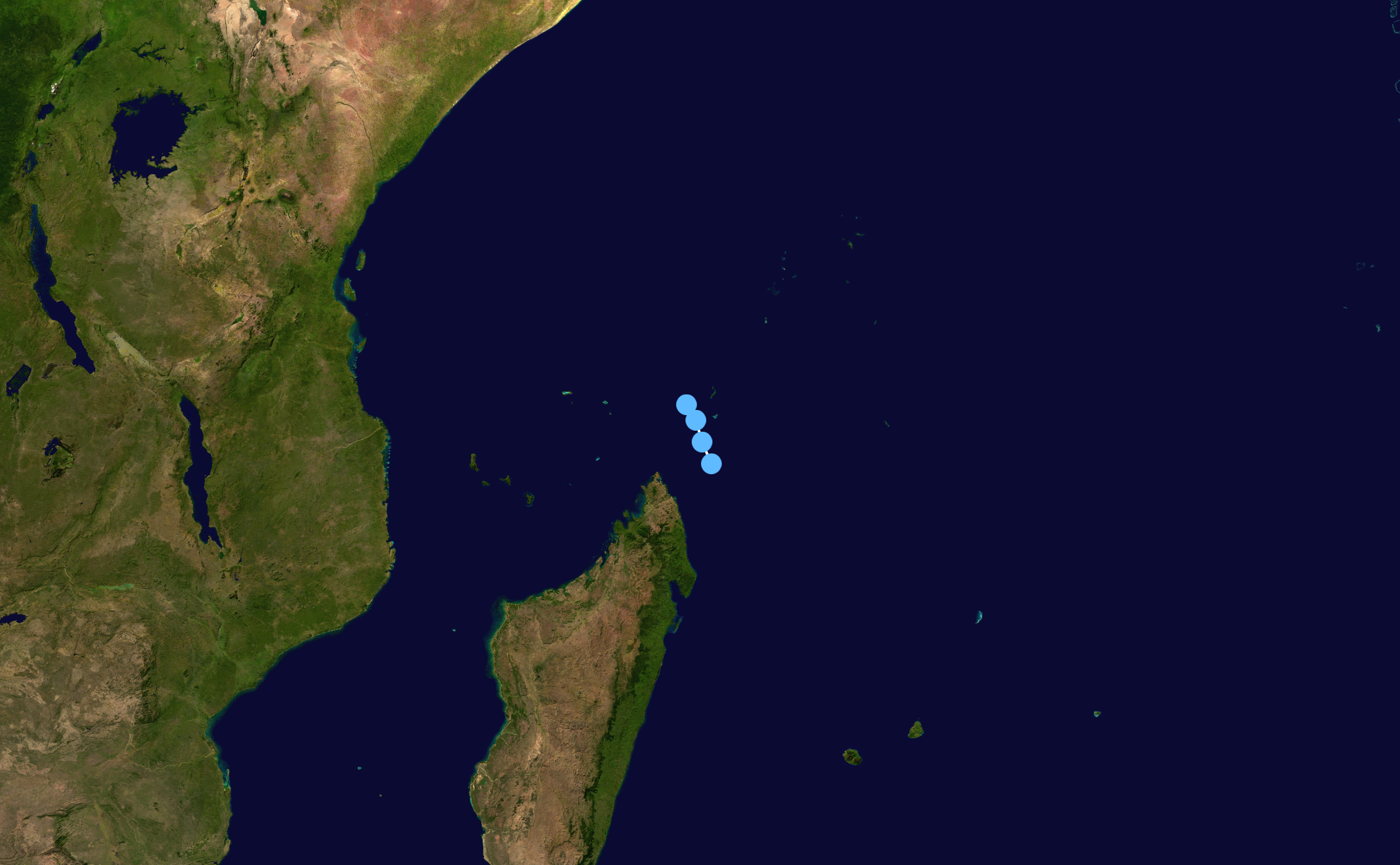
- Duration: March 25 – March 26
- Peak intensity: 75 km/h (45 mph) (10-min); 1005 hPa (mbar)

Tropical Disturbance Frederique existed from March 25 to March 26. It formed shortly before dissipating.

=== Moderate Tropical Storm Gladys ===
- Moderate tropical storm (MFR)
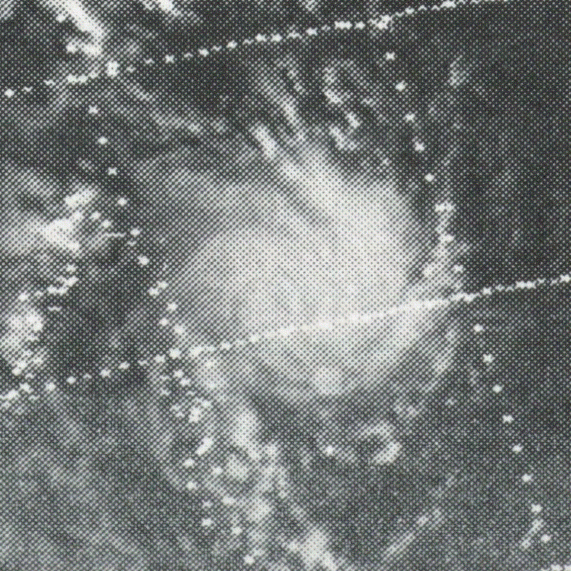
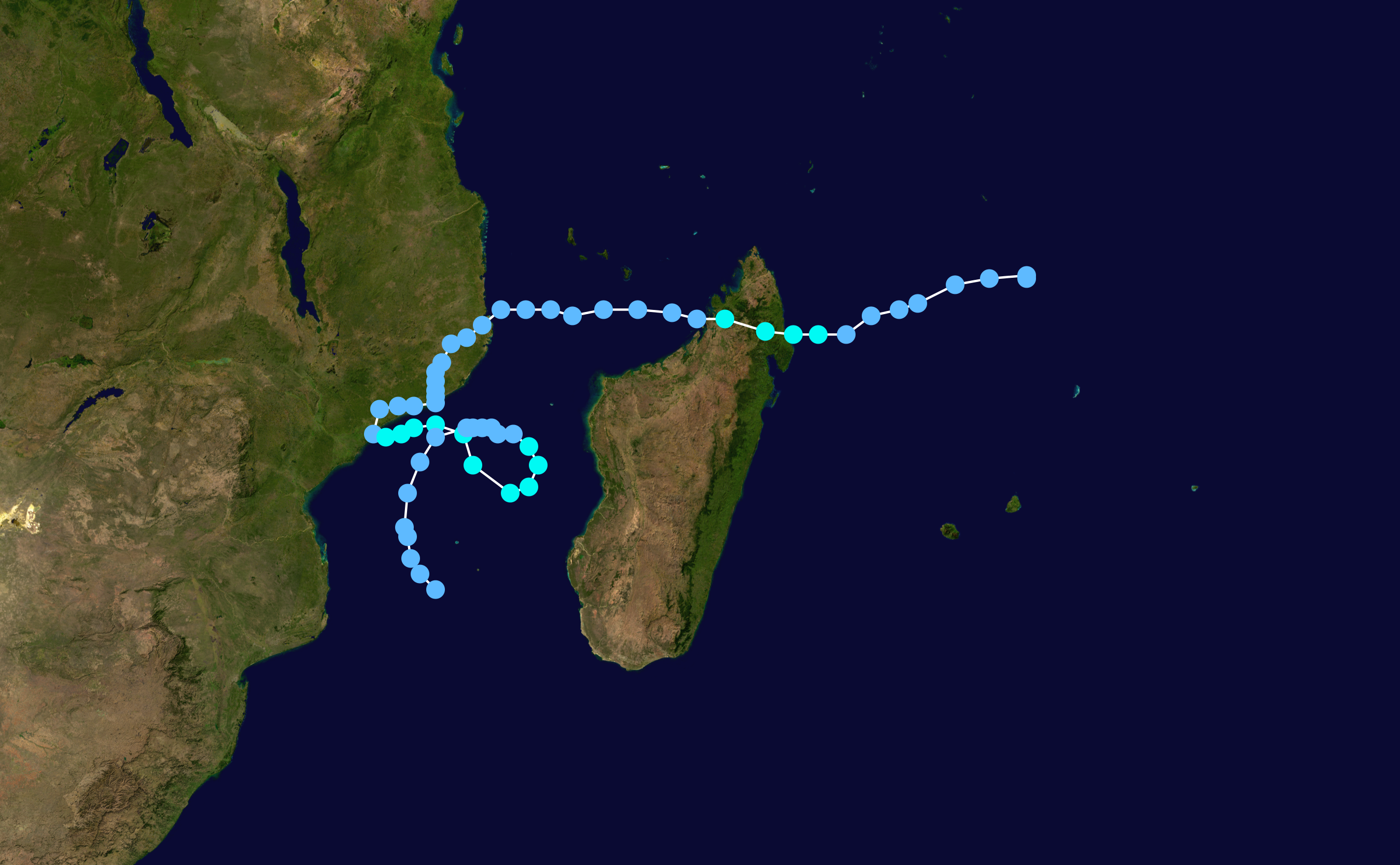
- Duration: March 27 – April 10
- Peak intensity: 85 km/h (50 mph) (10-min); 998 hPa (mbar)

Moderate Tropical Storm Gladys developed on March 27. It struck Madagascar and later Mozambique. Gladys then moved erratically in the Mozambique Channel before dissipating on April 10.

=== Moderate Tropical Storm Bert–Heliotrope ===
- Moderate tropical storm (MFR)
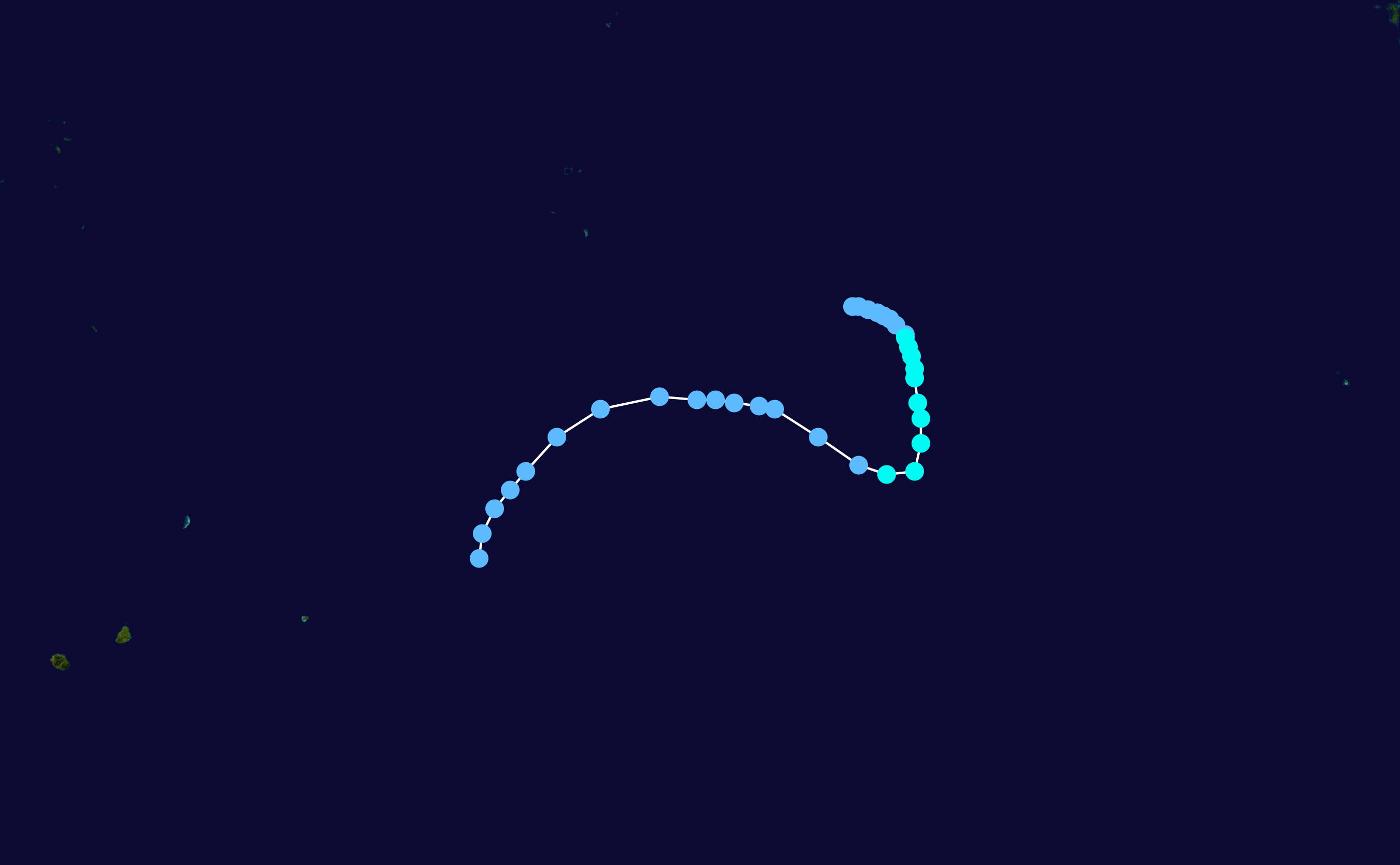
- Duration: April 3 – April 12
- Peak intensity: 85 km/h (50 mph) (10-min); 1000 hPa (mbar)

Moderate Tropical Storm Bert–Heliotrope existed from April 3 to April 12. It caused no damage or casualties and did not make landfall.

== Storm names ==
Within the South-West Indian Ocean basin, tropical systems that attain 10-minute sustained windspeeds of 65 km/h, (40 mph) are assigned a name by the Regional Specialized Meteorological Centre on Réunion (RSMC La Réunion). Systems that move into this region from the Australian region are given a second name by Météo-France. New naming lists are used every year so a name is normally used only once, thus no names are retired.

- Audrey
- Barbara
- Clotilde
- Danae
- Ella
- Frederique
- Gladys
- Heliotrope
- Io (unused)
- Jacqueline (unused)
- Kiki (unused)
- Luce (unused)
- Marylou (unused)
- Nadine (unused)
- Odile (unused)
- Patsy (unused)
- Rita (unused)
- Sonia (unused)
- Therese (unused)
- Ursule (unused)
- Valerie (unused)
- Yvonne (unused)
- Zoe (unused)

== Season effects ==
Name	Dates	Peak intensity			Areas affected	Damage (USD)	Deaths	Ref(s).
Name	Dates	Category	Wind speed	Pressure	Areas affected	Damage (USD)	Deaths	Ref(s).
Audrey	November 17 – 29, 1975	Moderate tropical storm	85 km/h (50 mph)	995 hPa (29.38 inHg)	None	None	None	
Barbara	December 3 – 19, 1975	Tropical cyclone	175 km/h (110 mph)	980 hPa (28.94 inHg)	None	None	None	
Clotilde	January 7 – 21, 1976	Very Intense Tropical cyclone	250 km/h (155 mph)	980 hPa (28.94 inHg)	None	None	None	
Terry–Danae	January 10 – 29, 1976	Very Intense Tropical cyclone	260 km/h (160 mph)	955 hPa (28.20 inHg)	None	None	None	
Elsa	March 9 - 12, 1976	Moderate tropical storm	85 km/h (50 mph)	995 hPa (29.38 inHg)	None	None	None	
Frederique	March 25 – 26, 1976	Moderate tropical storm	75 km/h (45 mph)	1005 hPa (29.68 inHg)	None	None	None	
Gladys	March 27 – April 10, 1976	Moderate tropical storm	85 km/h (50 mph)	998 hPa (29.47 inHg)	None	None	None	
Bert–Heliotrope	April 3 – 12, 1976	Moderate tropical storm	85 km/h (50 mph)	1000 hPa (29.53 inHg)	None	None	None	
Carol	May 3 – 9, 1976	Moderate tropical storm	85 km/h (50 mph)	992 hPa (29.29 inHg)	None	None	None	
Season aggregates
8 systems			260 km/h (160 mph)	955 hPa (28.20 inHg)				

== See also ==
- Atlantic hurricane seasons: 1975, 1976
- Eastern Pacific hurricane seasons: 1975, 1976
- Western Pacific typhoon seasons: 1975, 1976
- North Indian Ocean cyclone seasons: 1975, 1976
