= 1975–76 Australian region cyclone season =

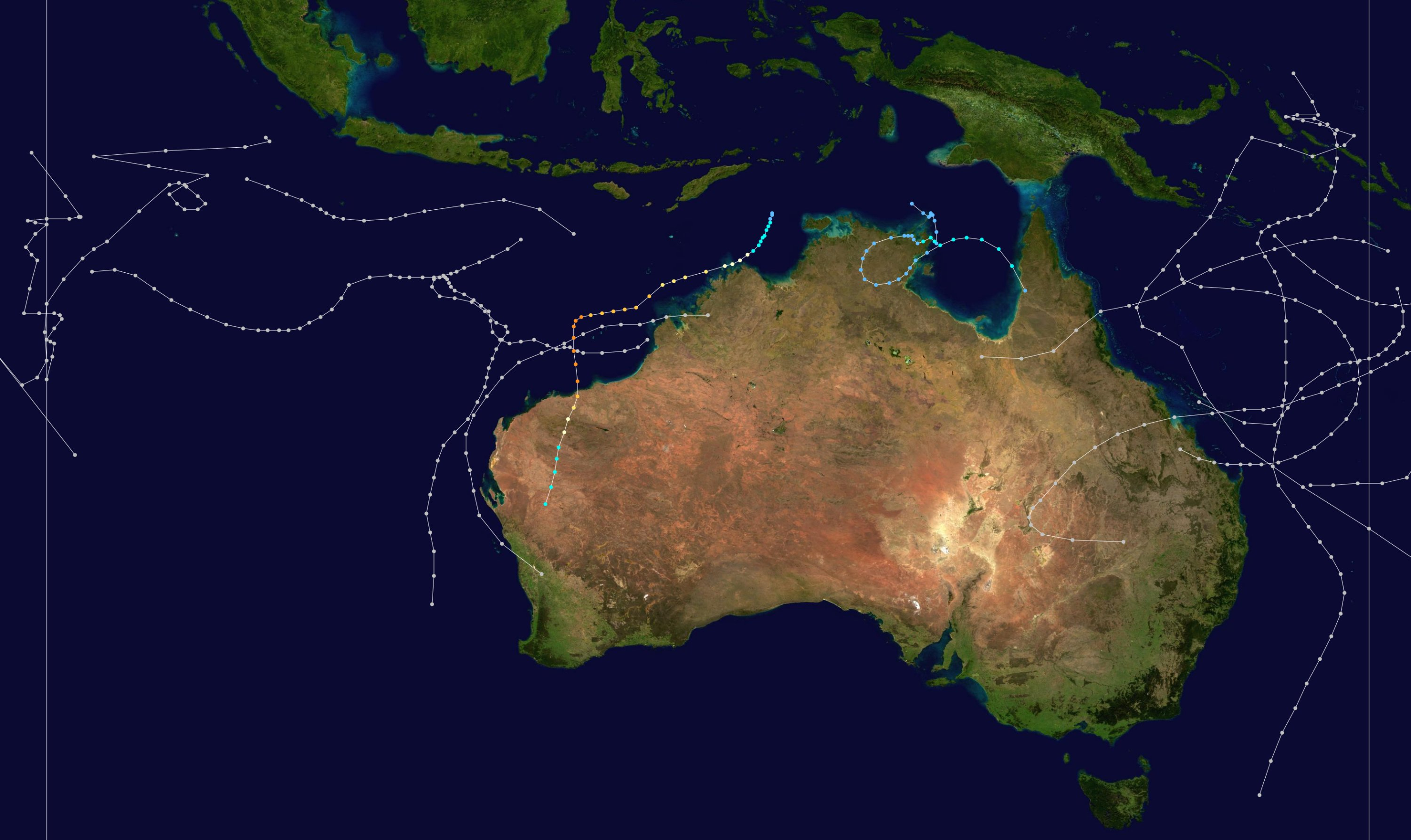
- Season summary map

Seasonal boundaries
- First system formed: 17 November 1975
- Last system dissipated: 9 May 1976

Strongest storm
- Name: Joan
  - Maximum winds: 215 km/h (130 mph) (10-minute sustained)
  - Lowest pressure: 915 hPa (mbar)

Seasonal statistics
- Tropical lows: 16
- Tropical cyclones: 16
- Severe tropical cyclones: 8
- Total fatalities: >1
- Total damage: $31 million (1976 USD)

Related articles
- 1975–76 South Pacific cyclone season; 1975–76 South-West Indian Ocean cyclone season

The 1975–76 Australian region cyclone season was an above average tropical cyclone season.

== Systems ==
=== Severe Tropical Cyclone Ray ===
- Category 3 severe tropical cyclone (Australian scale)
- Category 1 tropical cyclone (SSHWS)
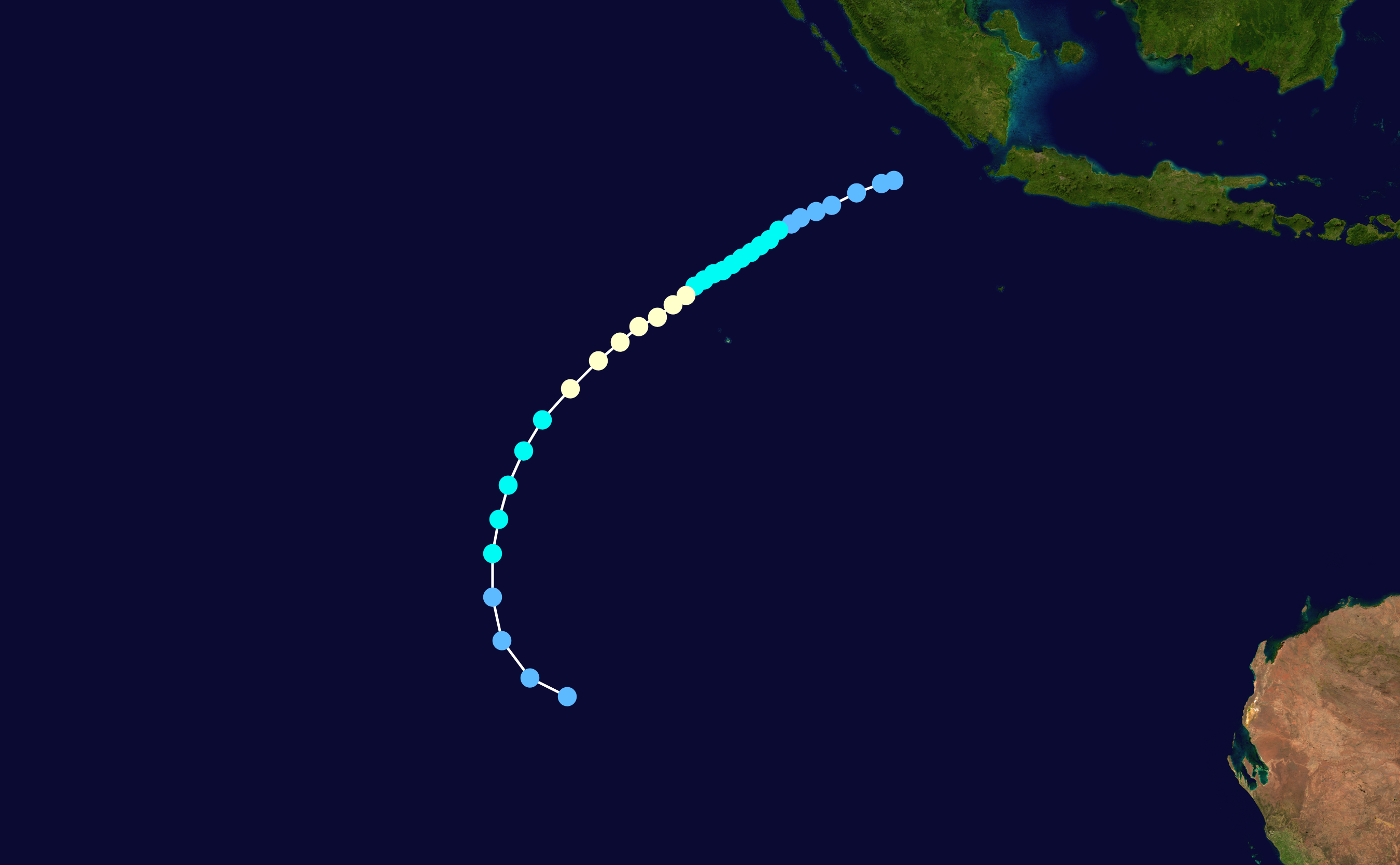
- Duration: 17 November – 25 November
- Peak intensity: 130 km/h (80 mph) (10-min); 973 hPa (mbar)

Ray developed from a low pressure area located west of Java. Ray threatened Cocos Island for two days while it was developing. The system eventually degenerated over the central Indian Ocean.

=== Severe Tropical Cyclone Joan ===
- Category 5 severe tropical cyclone (Australian scale)
- Category 4 tropical cyclone (SSHWS)
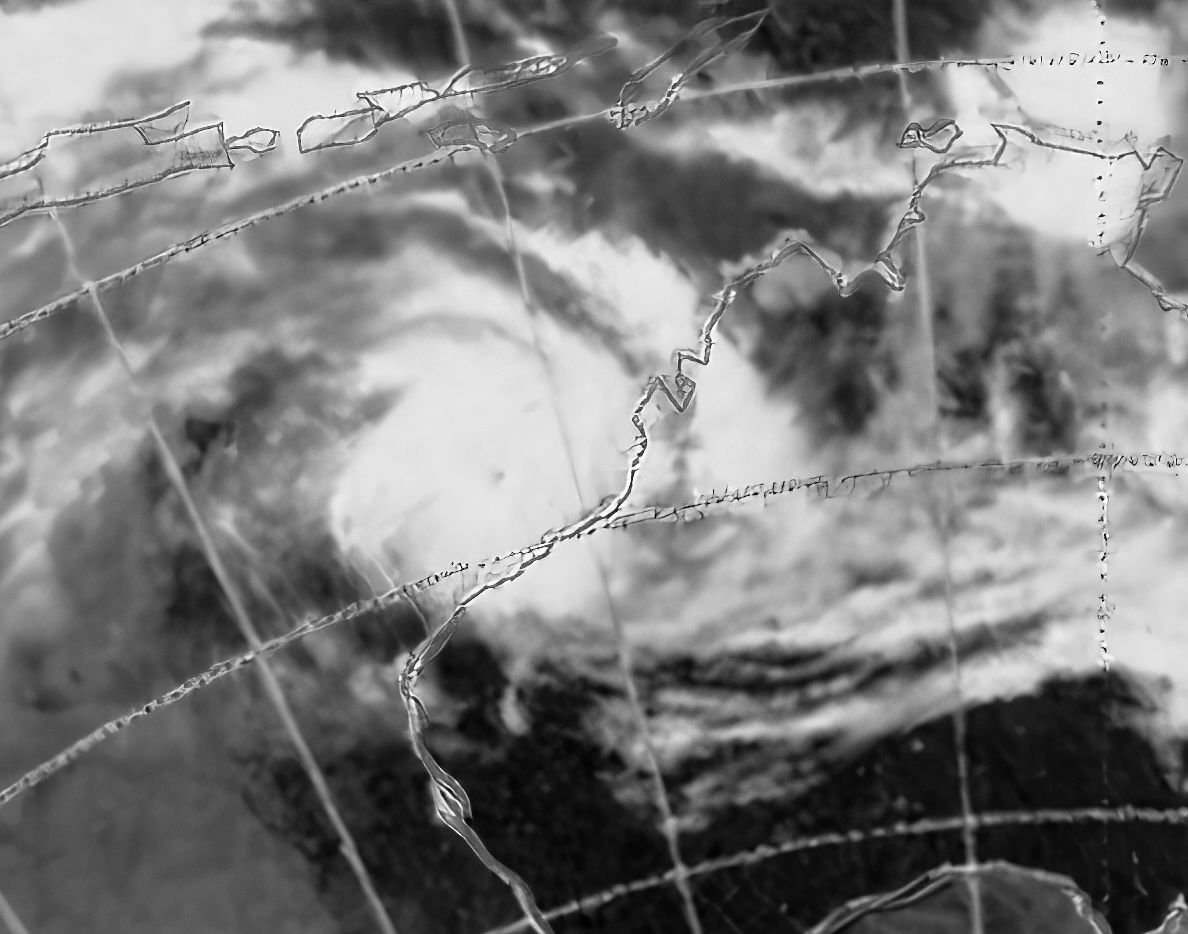
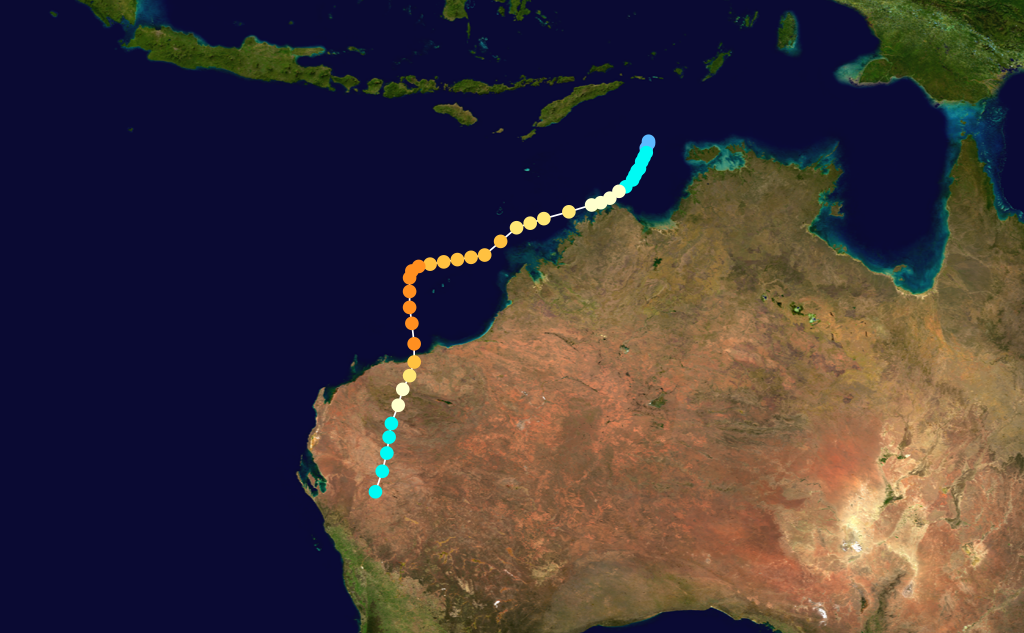
- Duration: 30 November – 10 December
- Peak intensity: 215 km/h (130 mph) (10-min); 915 hPa (mbar)

On the morning of 30 November, satellite imagery showed a large cloud mass in the Timor Sea. The satellite photograph received on the morning of 1 December showed that significant organization had occurred in the cloud mass during the previous 24 hours. It was deemed at 0115 UTC that the system be named the developing cyclone Joan, located about 310 km west-northwest of Darwin. Joan's movement in the following 48 hours was towards the southwest at an average 5 km/h. The first evidence of the increasing strength of Joan came as the cyclone moved west-southwest past the northernmost areas of Western Australia on 3 December. The cyclone's generally west-southwesterly track after 2 December took it away from the coast until 0900 6 December when it was about 420 km north of Port Hedland and the system turned southward. At about 2200 UTC 7 December, the eye of tropical cyclone Joan crossed the coast about 50 km west of Port Hedland. The cyclone was travelling south-southwest at about 14 km/h and crossed over or adjacent to the homesteads on the pastoral properties Mundabullangana, Mallina, Coolawanyah, Hamersley, and Mount Brockman. As cyclone Joan crossed the coastal plain and the Chichester Range only a slow moderation of its intensity seems to have occurred, but as the cyclone crossed the Hamersley Range the available evidence suggests that a rapid weakening took place.

Tropical cyclone Joan was the most destructive cyclone to affect the Port Hedland area in more than 30 years. The city was subjected to sustained winds exceeding 90 km/h for about 10 hours with winds in excess of 120 km/h for three hours. The maximum measured wind gust of 208 km/h on 8 December, is the fourth highest on record in Australia. Severe property damage occurred at Port Hedland and at other settlements close to the cyclone's path. Subsequent flooding damaged roads and sections of the iron ore railways, particularly that of Hamersley Iron Pty Ltd. Sheep losses were heavy but, remarkably, no loss of human life or serious injury was reported. The estimated damage to private property and public facilities is believed to have exceeded $25 million.

=== Tropical Cyclone Kim ===
- Category 1 tropical cyclone (Australian scale)
- Tropical storm (SSHWS)
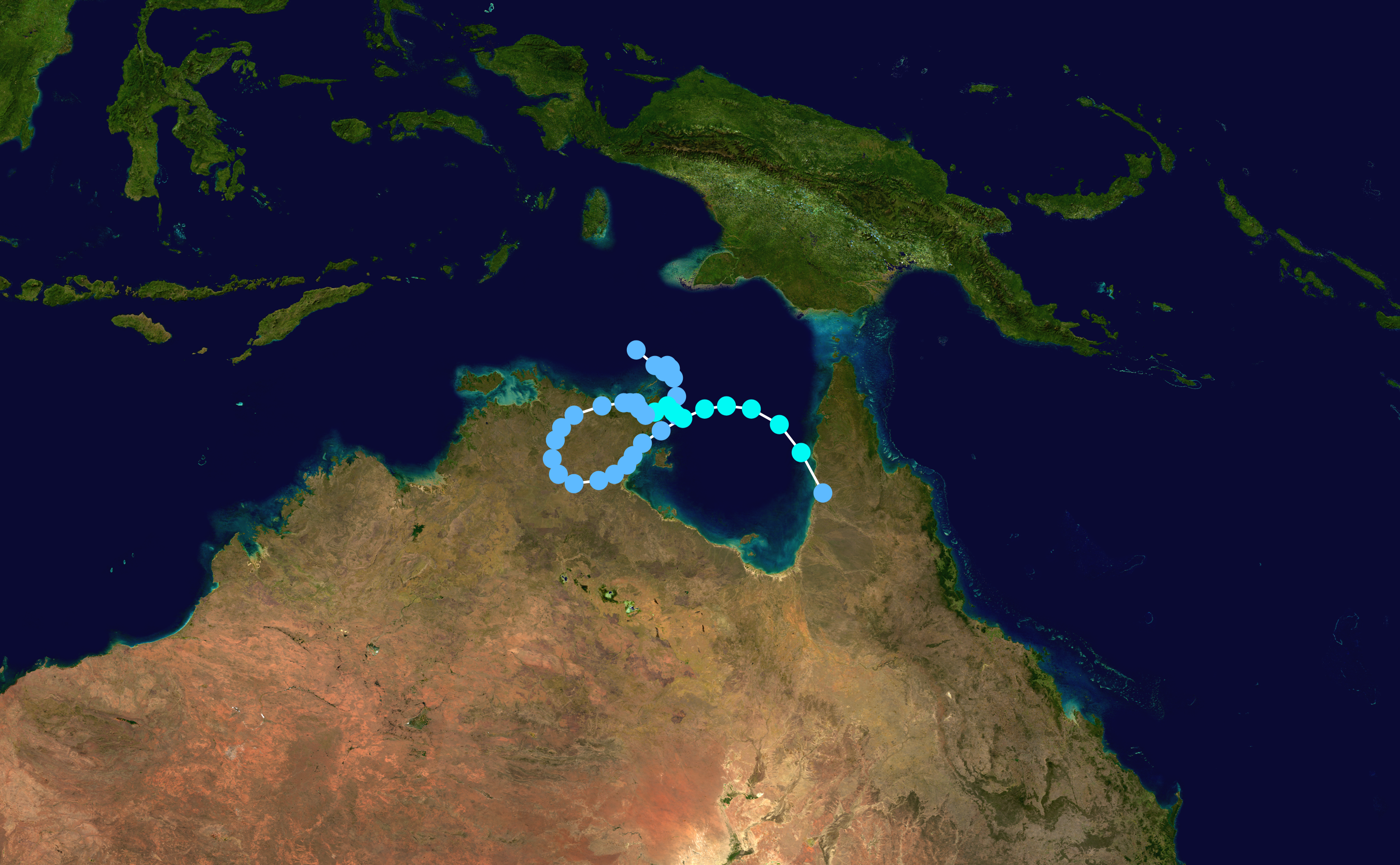
- Duration: 1 December – 10 December
- Peak intensity: 85 km/h (50 mph) (10-min); 990 hPa (mbar)

=== Tropical Cyclone Sue ===
- Category 1 tropical cyclone (Australian scale)
- Tropical storm (SSHWS)
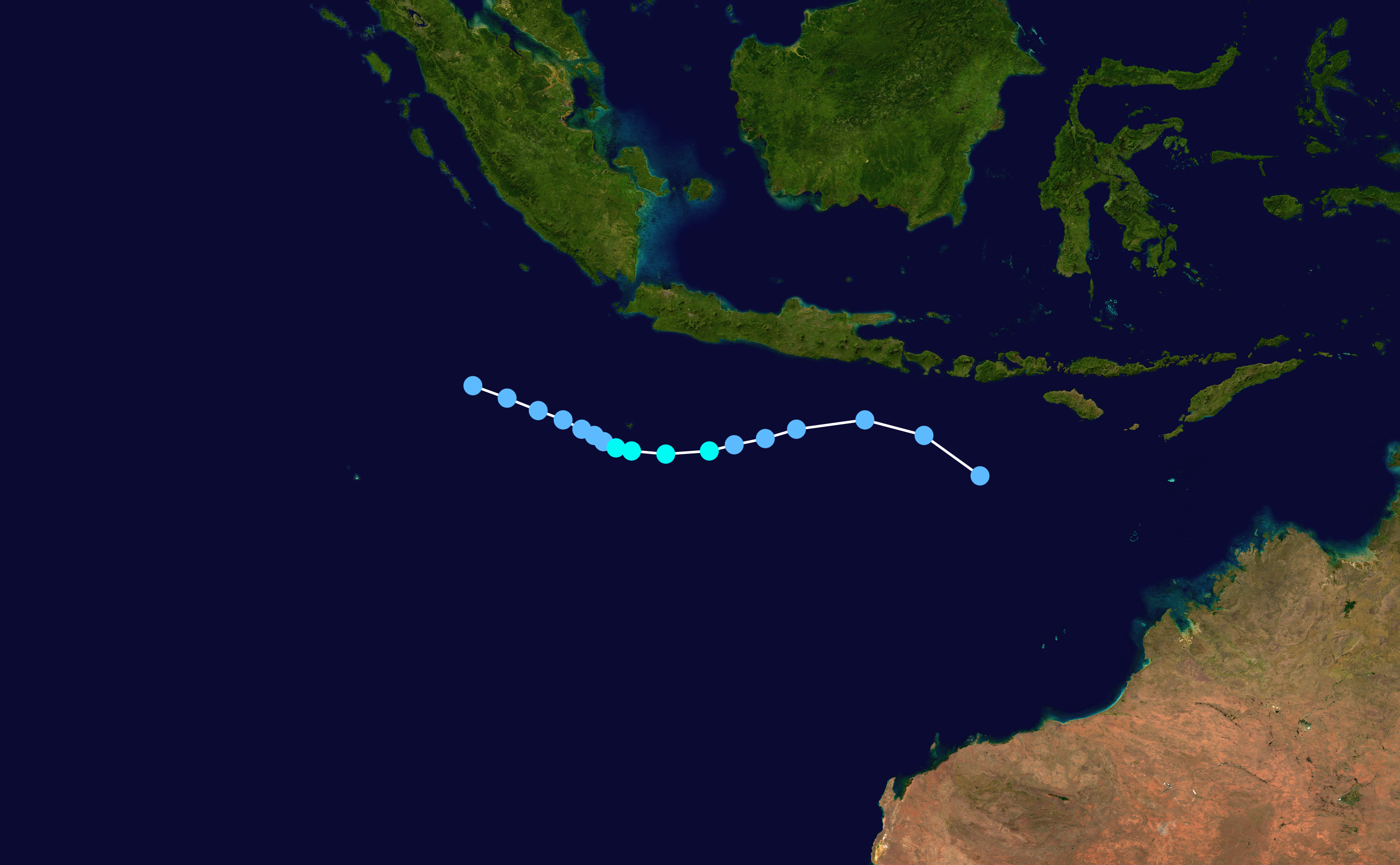
- Duration: 12 December – 16 December
- Peak intensity: 75 km/h (45 mph) (10-min); 994 hPa (mbar)

Sue was not an intense cyclone but moved in an eastward direction. It passed within 90 km (56 mi) of Christmas Island. One ship reported winds exceeding gale force. Winds up to 75 km/h (47 mph) were reported near the centre, lower than what the ship recorded. 78 mm (3.1 in) of rain fell at Christmas Island in a 3-day period.

=== Severe Tropical Cyclone David ===
- Category 3 severe tropical cyclone (Australian scale)
- Category 2 tropical cyclone (SSHWS)
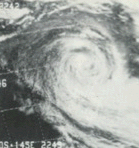
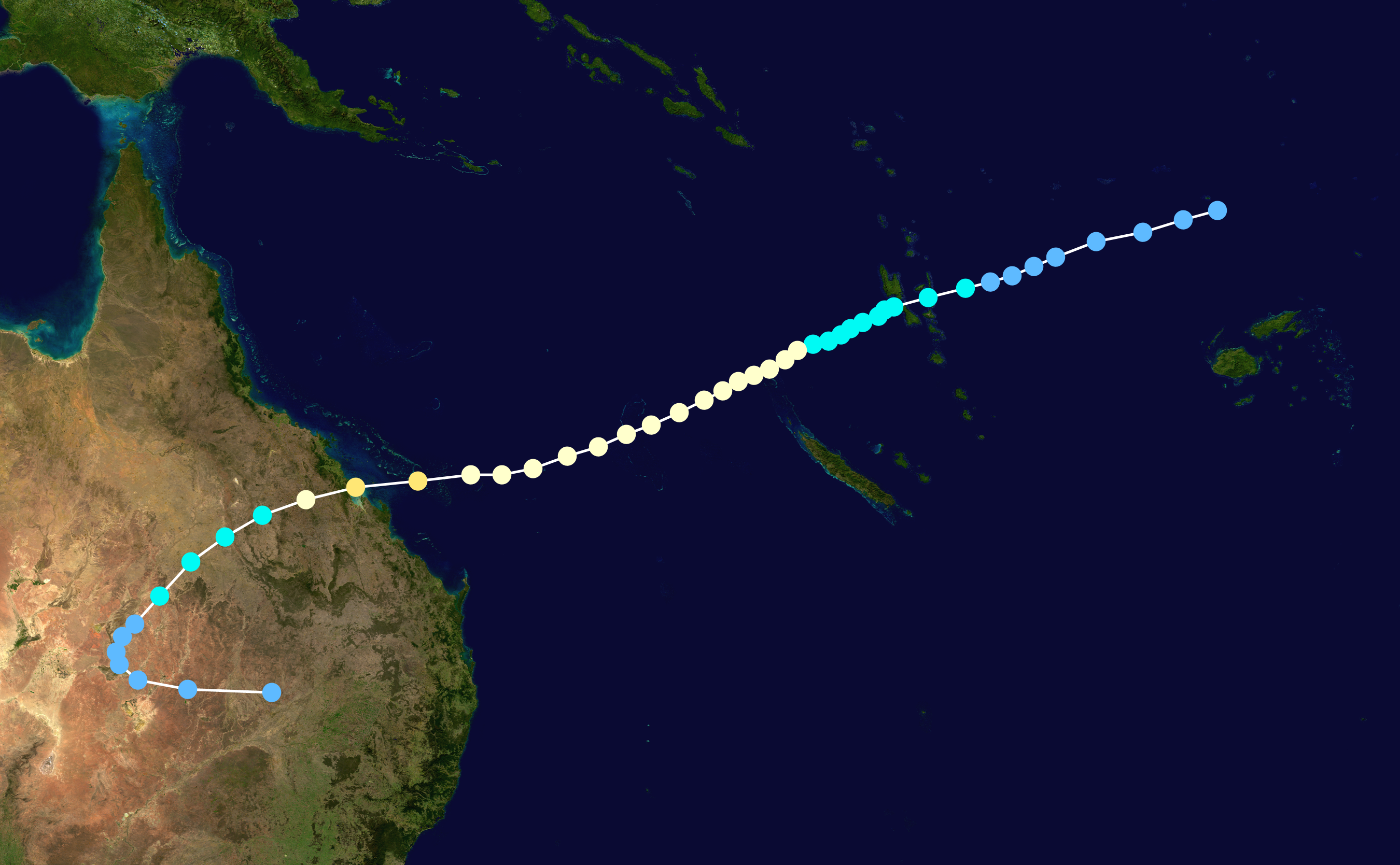
- Duration: 11 January – 22 January
- Peak intensity: 155 km/h (100 mph) (10-min); 961 hPa (mbar)

=== Severe Tropical Cyclone Vanessa ===
- Category 3 severe tropical cyclone (Australian scale)
- Category 1 tropical cyclone (SSHWS)
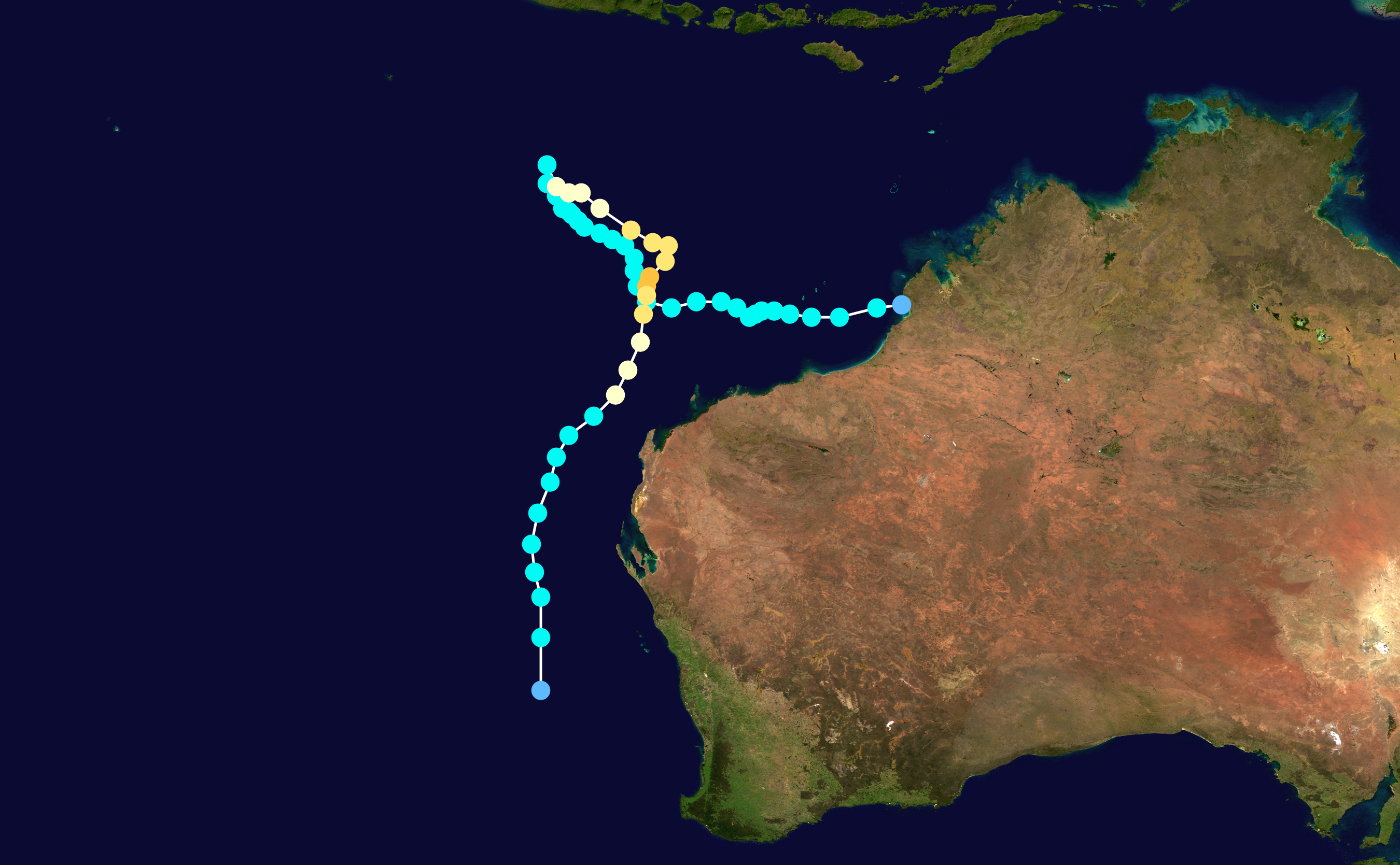
- Duration: 15 January – 28 January
- Peak intensity: 140 km/h (85 mph) (10-min); 950 hPa (mbar)

Vanessa developed slowly as it moved westward from the Broome area. It affected many coastal communities despite not making landfall. Maximum winds were recorded at 75 km/h (47 mph) in the Exmouth area on 25 January, with a gust of 87 km/h (54 mph) recorded in Perth on 28 January. Seas as high as 7.5 m (25 ft) and swell as high as 10 m (33 ft) were reported by ships. No surge or sea damage was reported, but caused some disruptions to shipping services.

=== Tropical Cyclone Alan ===
- Category 1 tropical cyclone (Australian scale)
- Tropical storm (SSHWS)
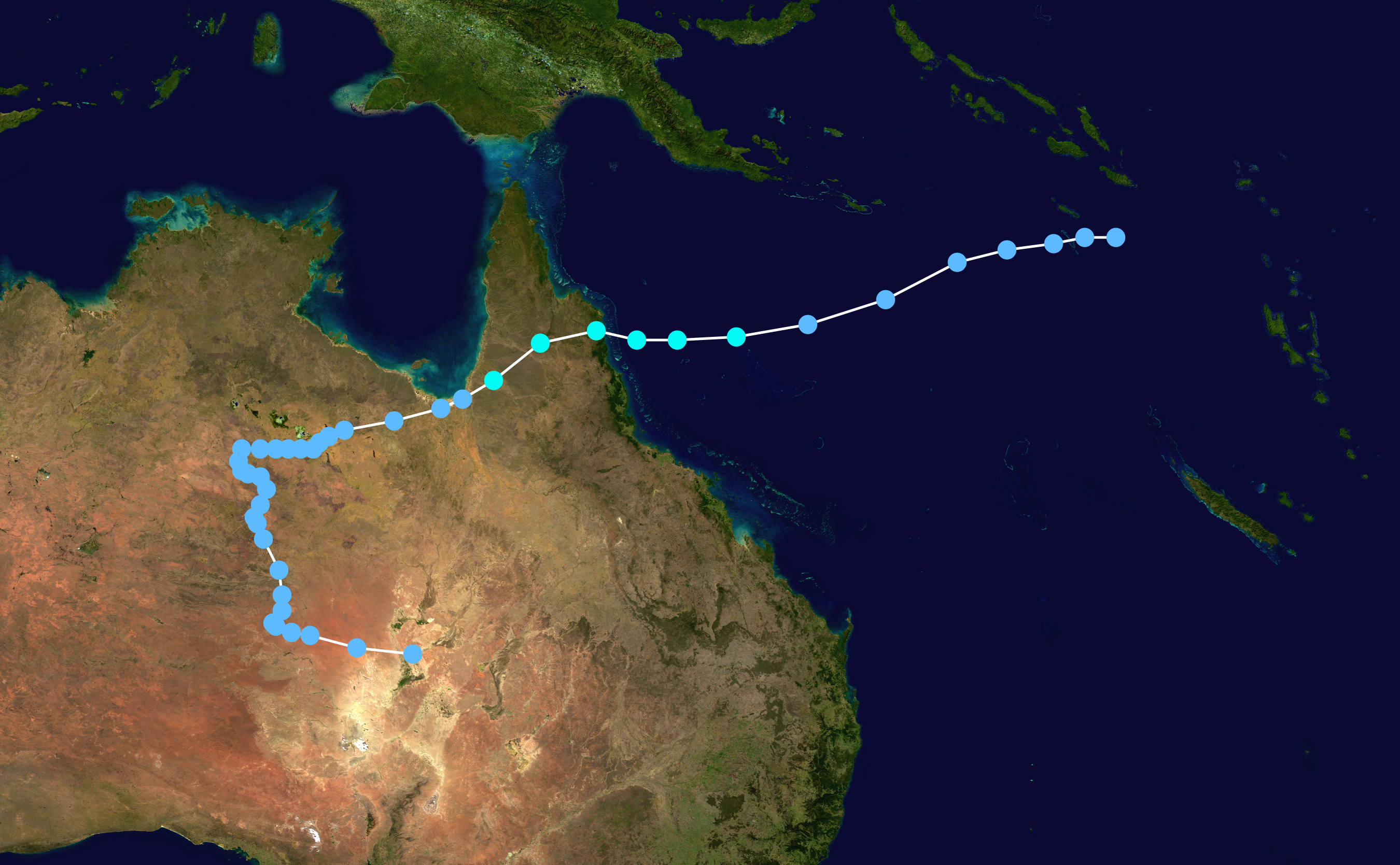
- Duration: 30 January – 9 February
- Peak intensity: 65 km/h (40 mph) (10-min); 989 hPa (mbar)

=== Severe Tropical Cyclone Beth ===
- Category 3 severe tropical cyclone (Australian scale)
- Category 1 tropical cyclone (SSHWS)
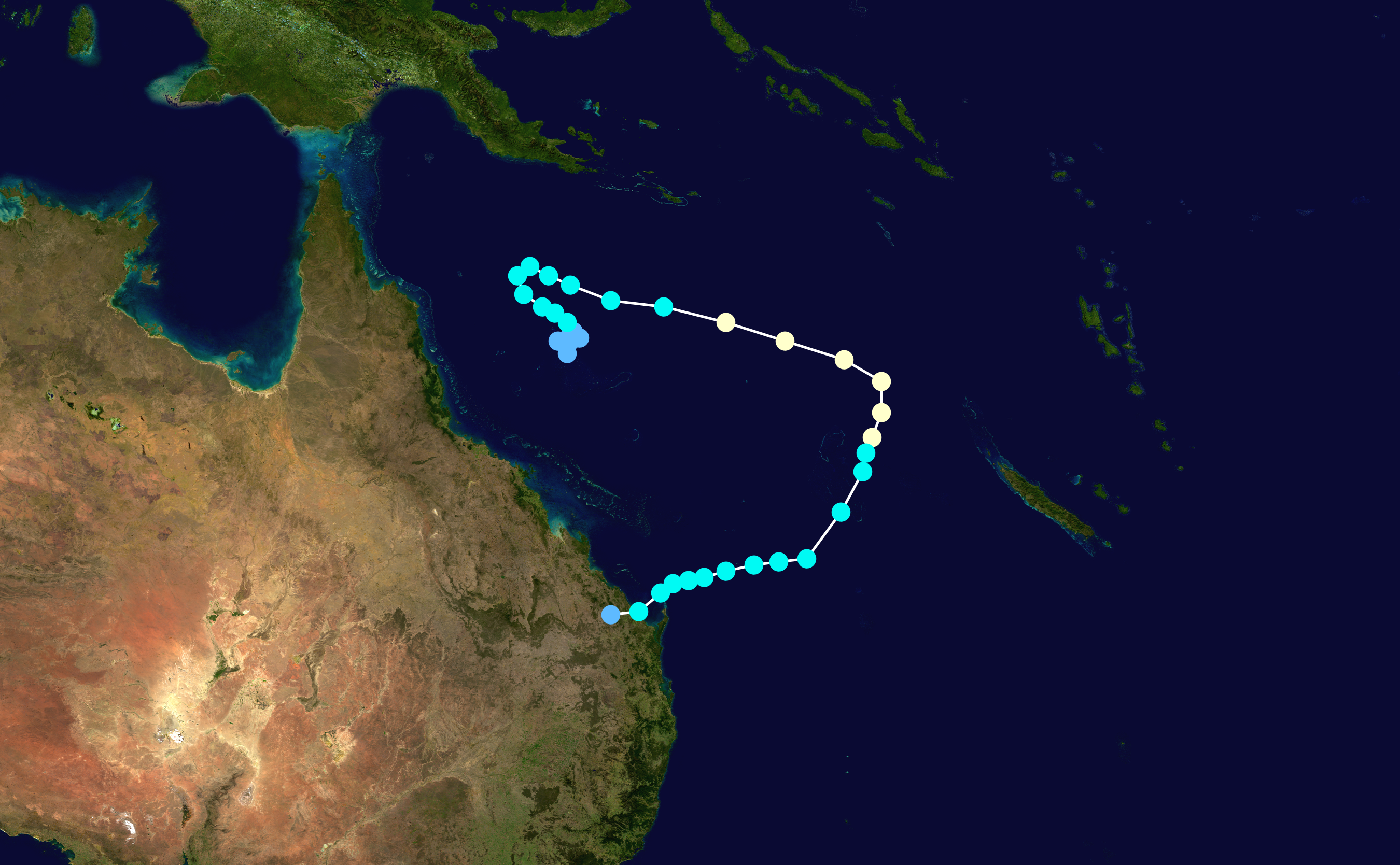
- Duration: 13 February – 22 February
- Peak intensity: 130 km/h (80 mph) (10-min); 972 hPa (mbar)

=== Severe Tropical Cyclone Wally ===
- Category 3 severe tropical cyclone (Australian scale)
- Category 1 tropical cyclone (SSHWS)
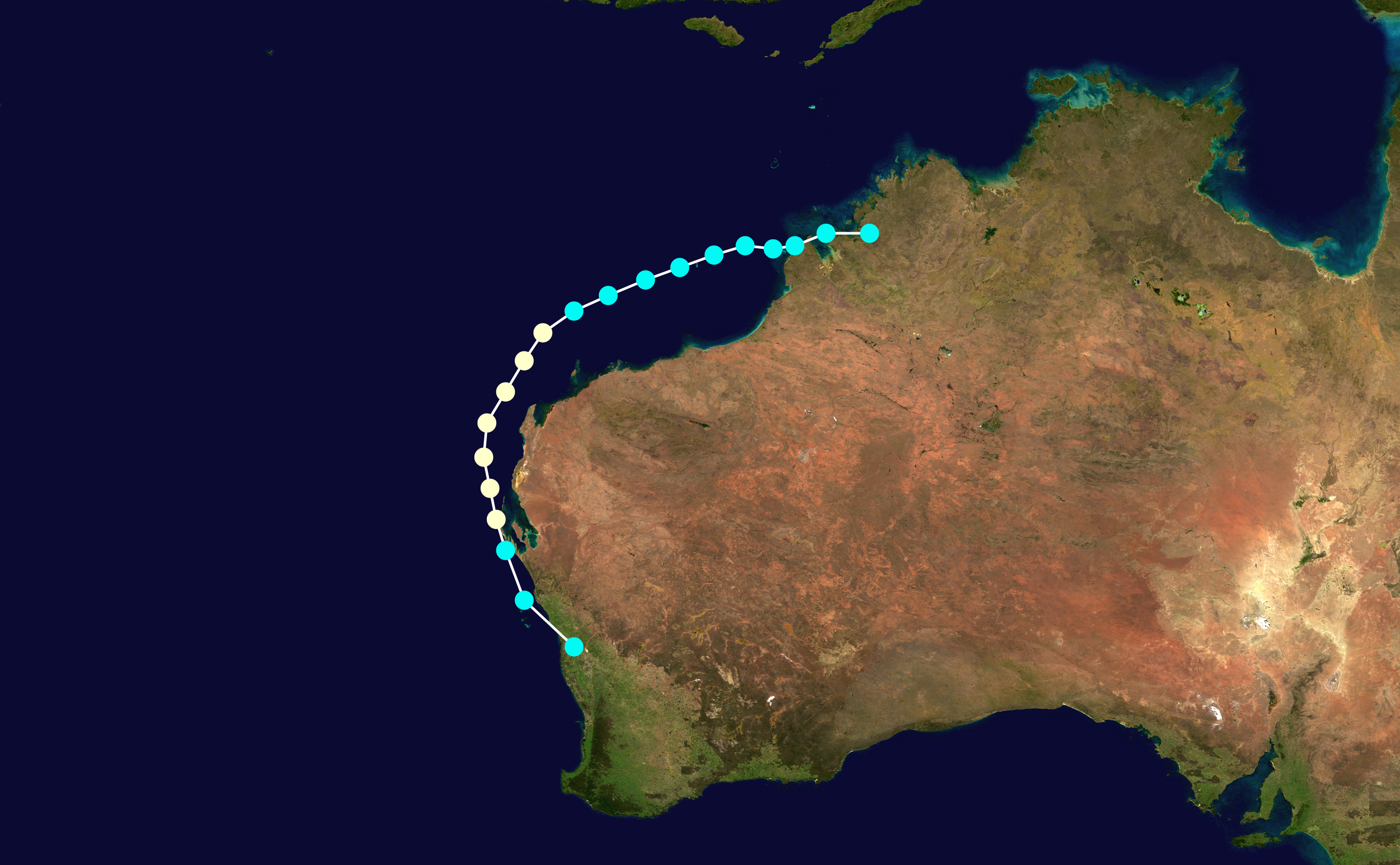
- Duration: 22 February – 27 February
- Peak intensity: 140 km/h (85 mph) (10-min); 973 hPa (mbar)

=== Tropical Cyclone Hope ===
- Category 1 tropical cyclone (Australian scale)
- Tropical storm (SSHWS)
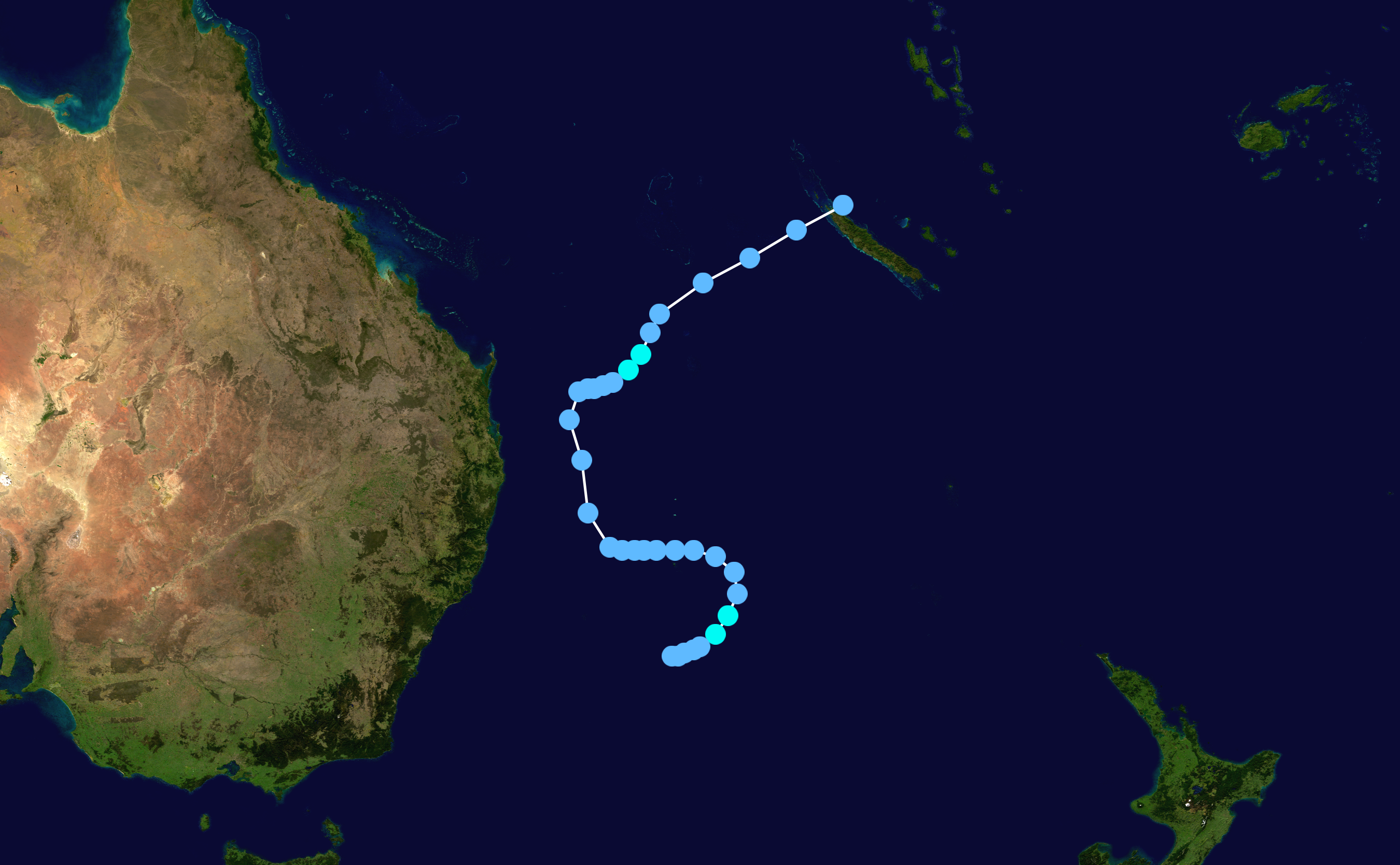
- Duration: 24 February – 6 March
- Peak intensity: 75 km/h (45 mph) (10-min); 990 hPa (mbar)

=== Severe Tropical Cyclone Colin ===
- Category 3 severe tropical cyclone (Australian scale)
- Category 2 tropical cyclone (SSHWS)
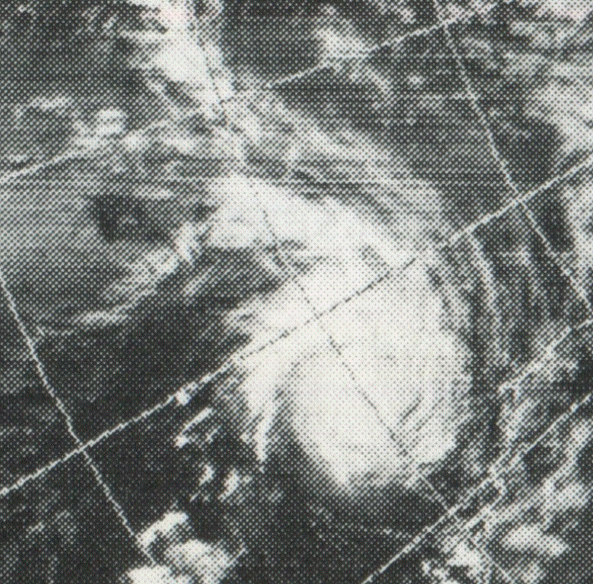
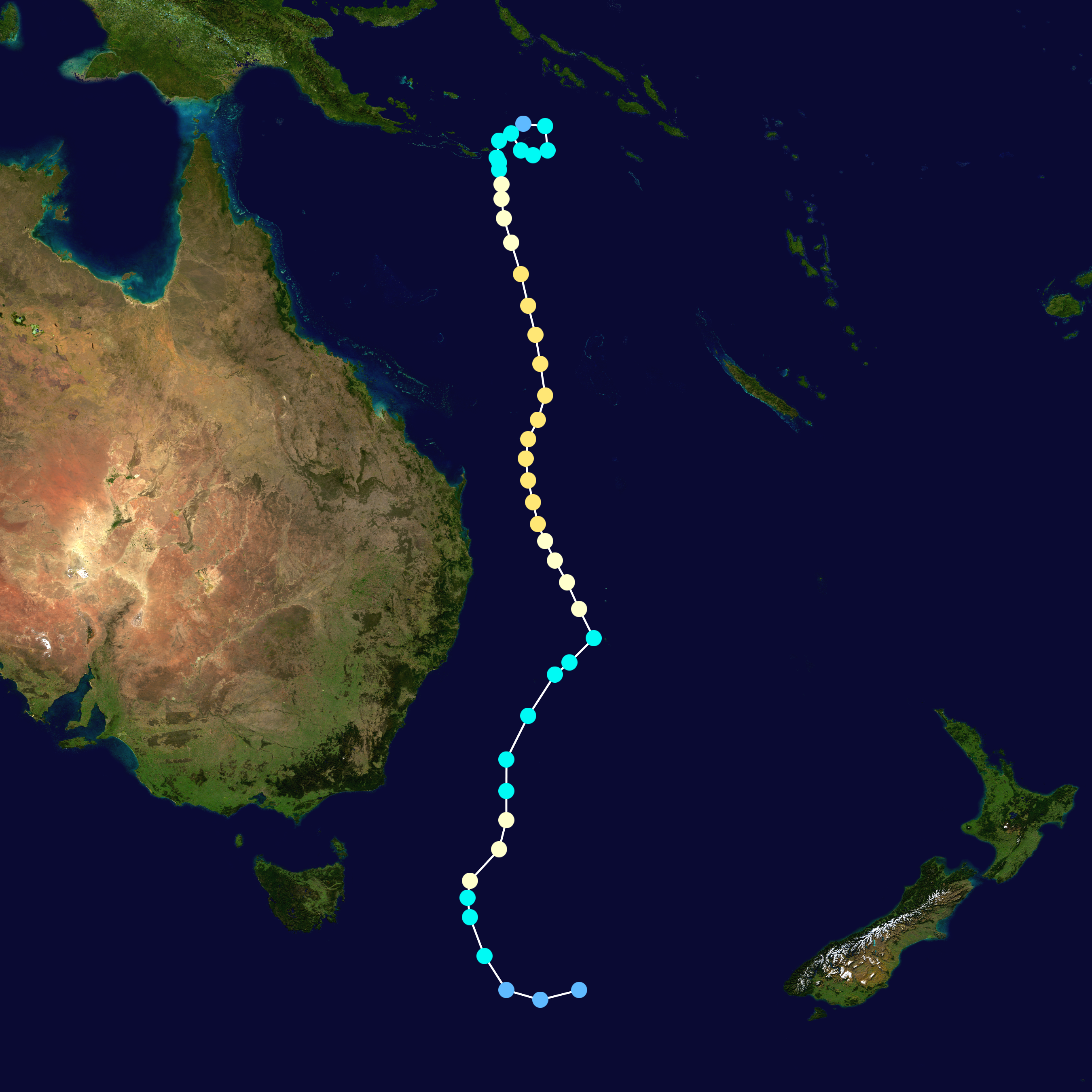
- Duration: 25 February – 7 March
- Peak intensity: 155 km/h (100 mph) (10-min); 954 hPa (mbar)

Colin churned up rough seas all across the eastern coast of Australia and caused one fatality as a result when a large wave swept a woman off a cliff.

=== Tropical Cyclone Alice ===
- Category 2 tropical cyclone (Australian scale)
- Tropical storm (SSHWS)
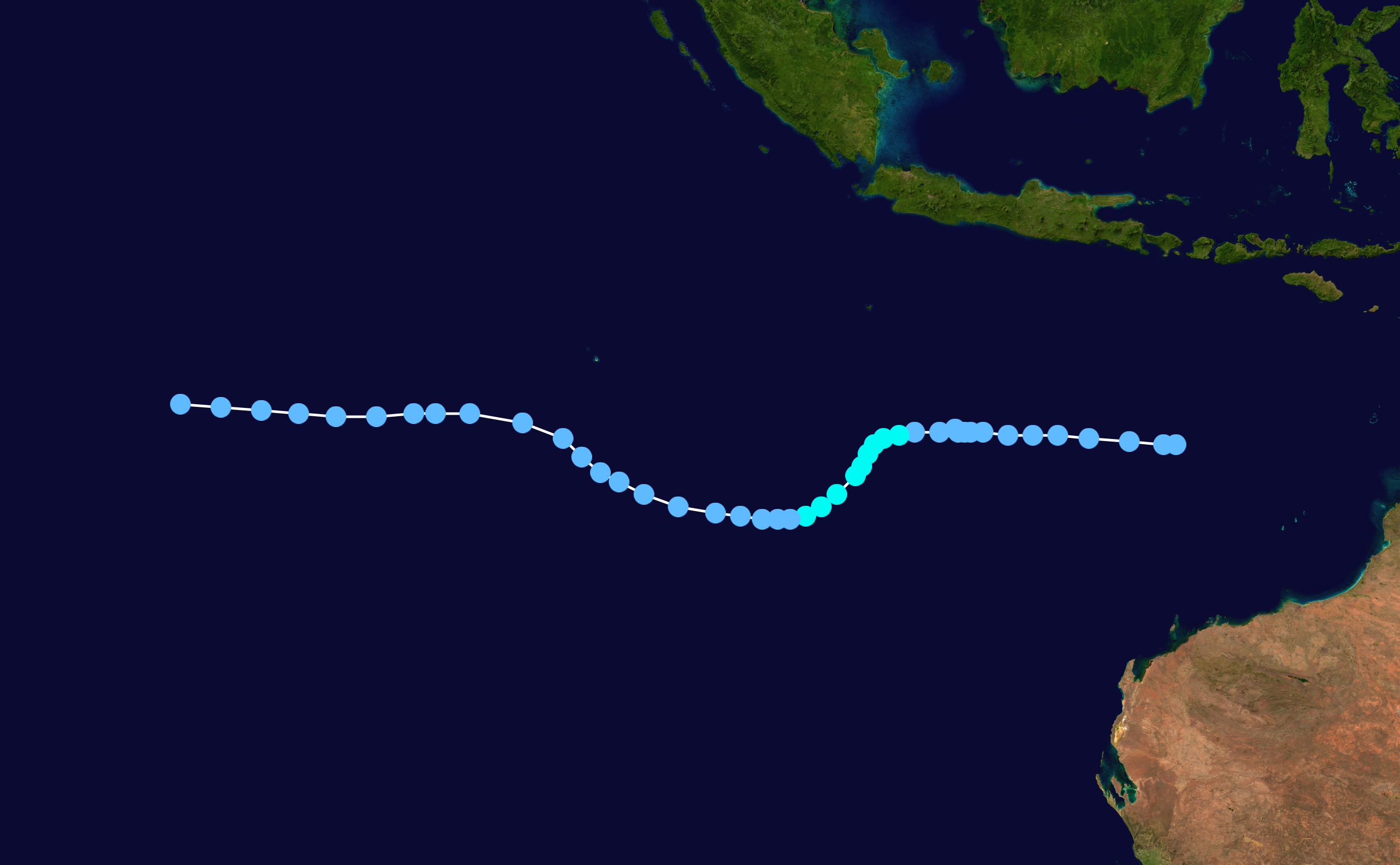
- Duration: 2 March – 13 March
- Peak intensity: 95 km/h (60 mph) (10-min); 988 hPa (mbar)

=== Tropical Cyclone Dawn ===
- Category 2 tropical cyclone (Australian scale)
- Tropical storm (SSHWS)
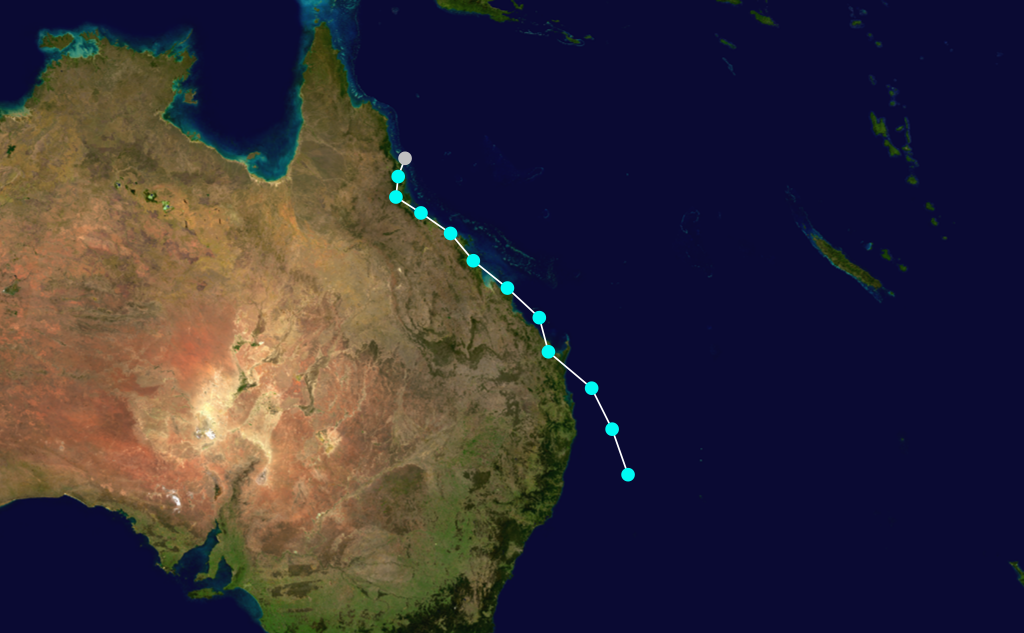
- Duration: 3 March – 6 March
- Peak intensity: 95 km/h (60 mph) (10-min); 988 hPa (mbar)

=== Tropical Cyclone Linda ===
- Category 1 tropical cyclone (Australian scale)
- Tropical storm (SSHWS)
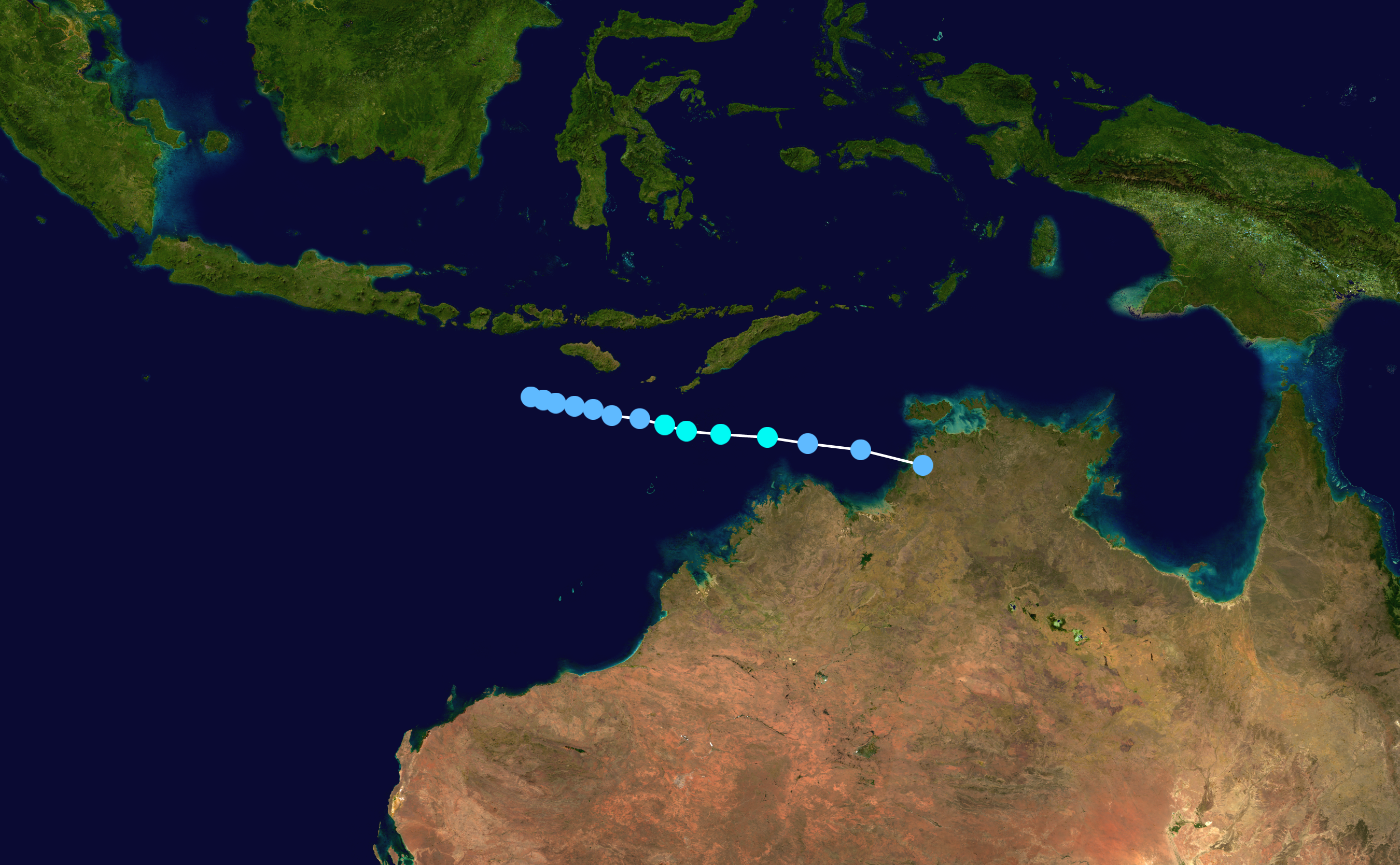
- Duration: 14 March – 17 March
- Peak intensity: 75 km/h (45 mph) (10-min); 995 hPa (mbar)

=== Severe Tropical Cyclone Watorea ===
- Category 4 severe tropical cyclone (Australian scale)
- Category 1 tropical cyclone (SSHWS)
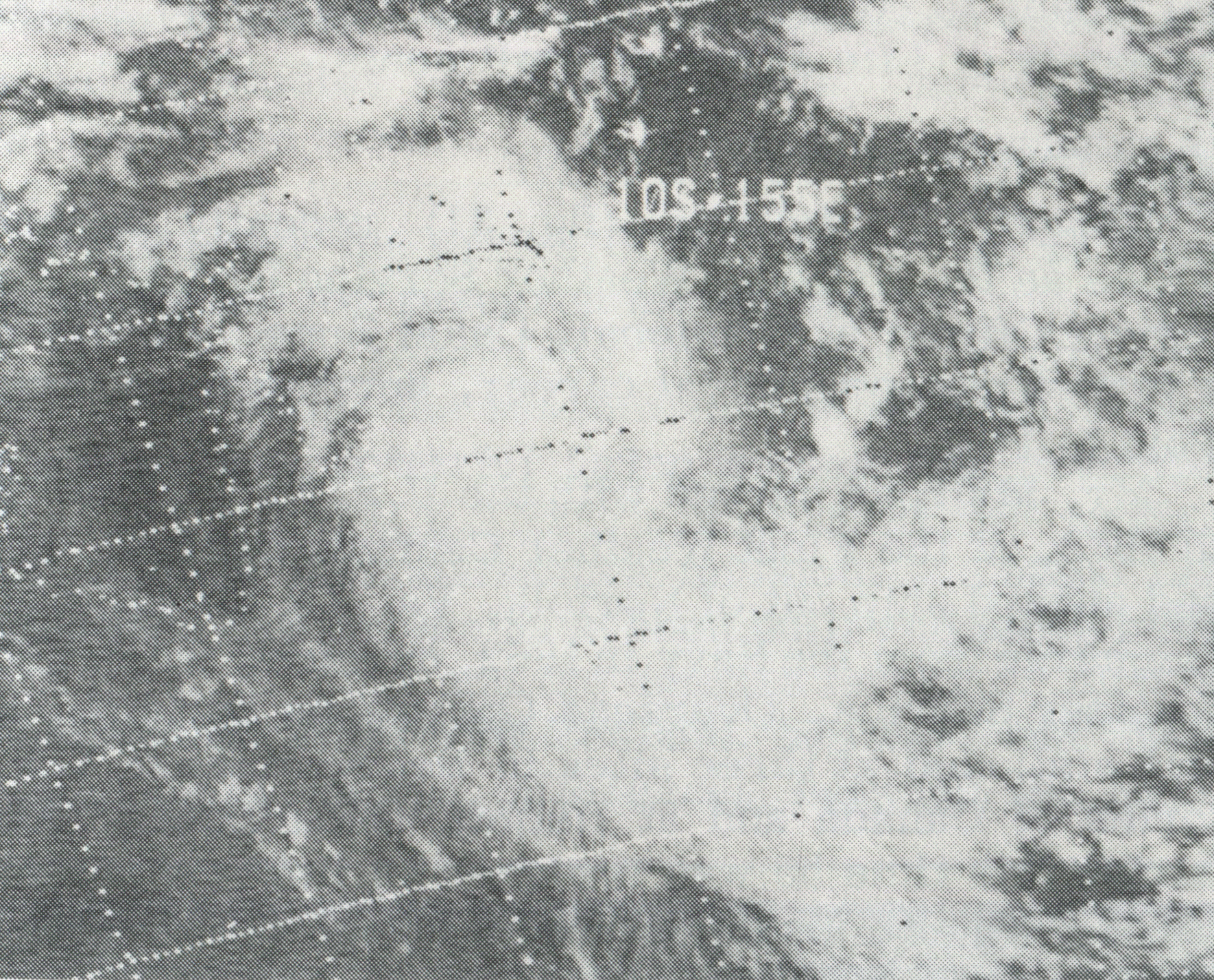
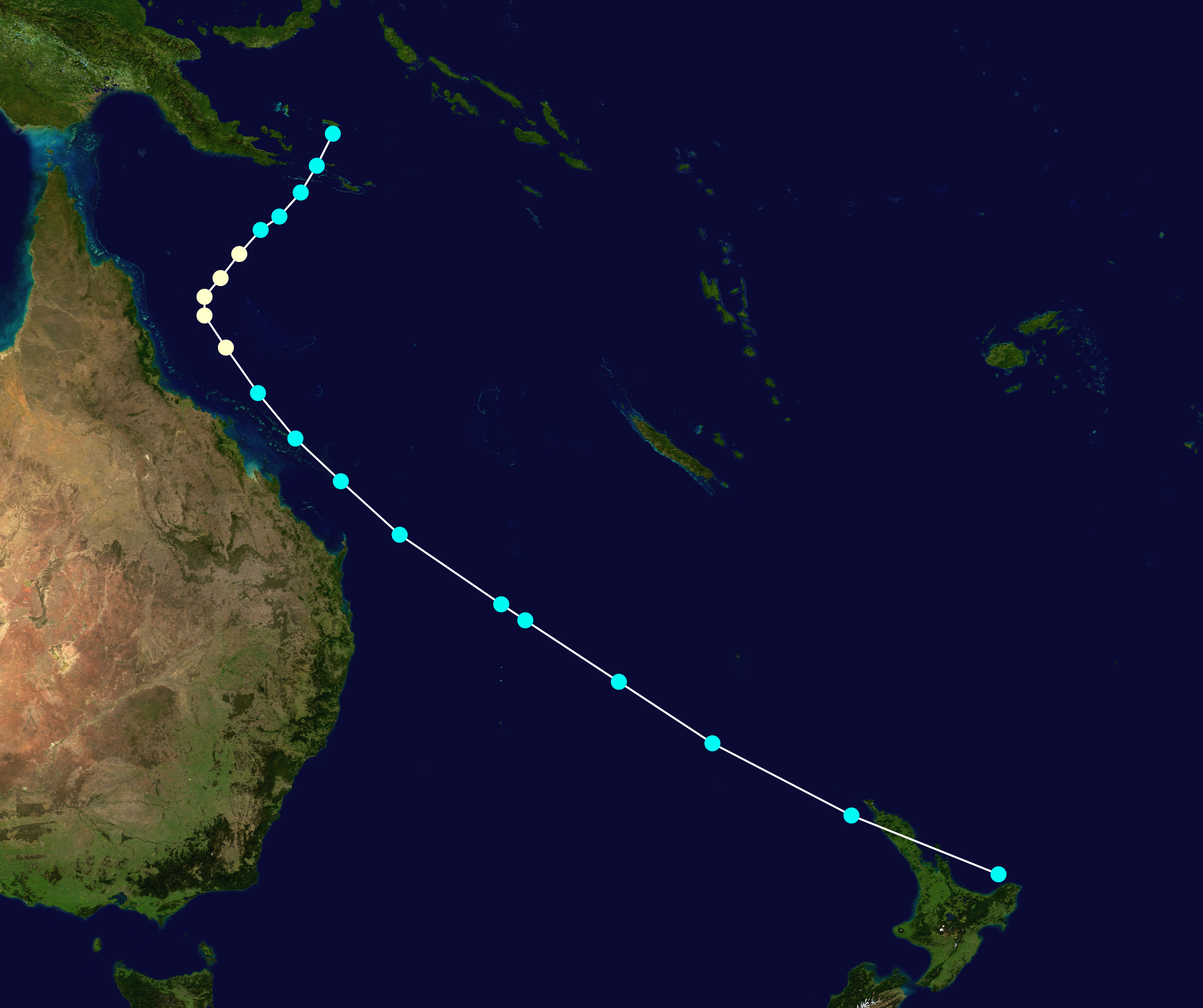
- Duration: 25 April – 28 April
- Peak intensity: 165 km/h (105 mph) (10-min); 970 hPa (mbar)

=== Tropical Cyclone Carol ===
- Category 1 tropical cyclone (Australian scale)
- Tropical storm (SSHWS)
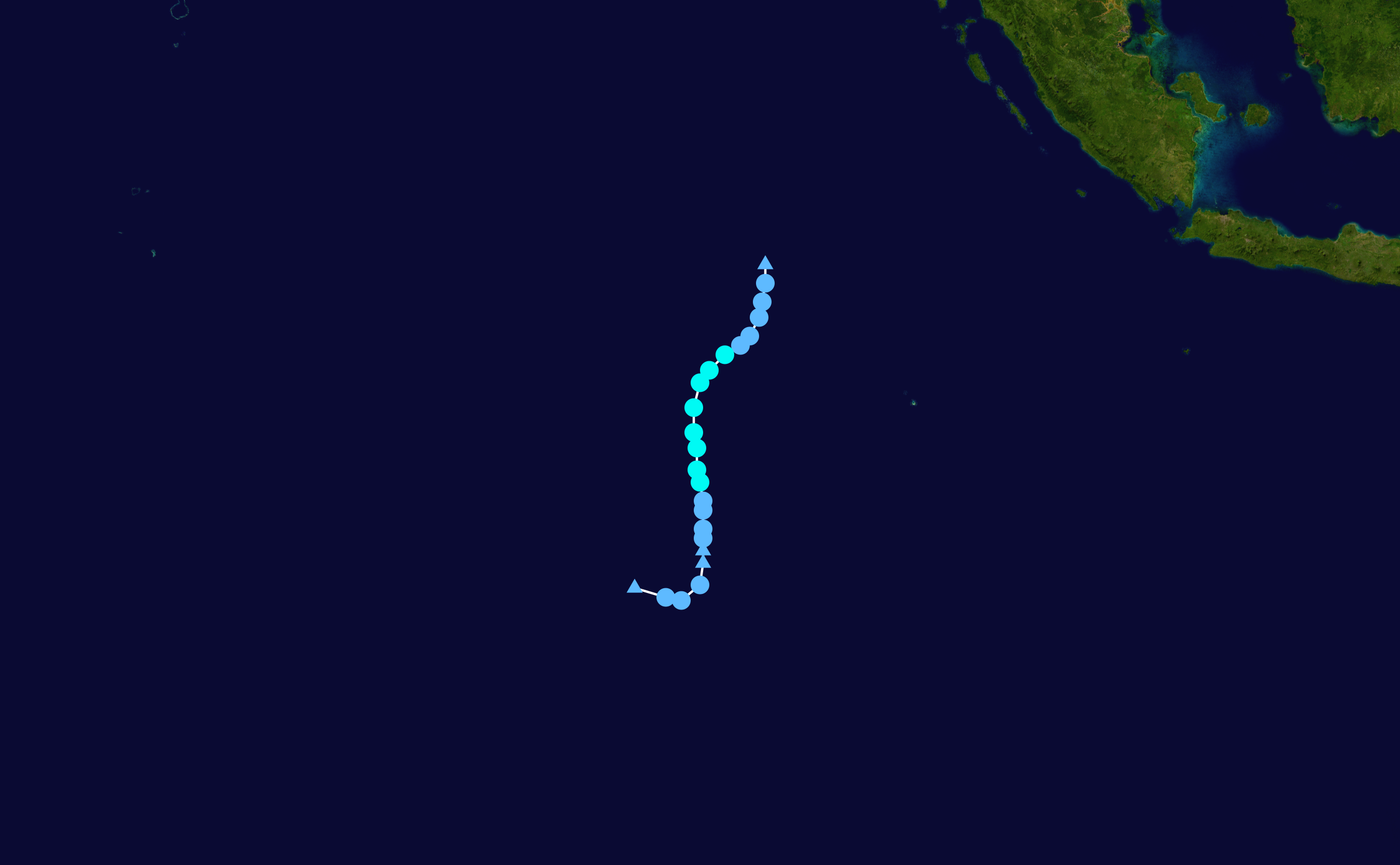
- Duration: 3 May – 9 May
- Peak intensity: 85 km/h (50 mph) (10-min); 991 hPa (mbar)

== See also ==
- Atlantic hurricane seasons: 1975, 1976
- Eastern Pacific hurricane seasons: 1975, 1976
- Western Pacific typhoon seasons: 1975, 1976
- North Indian Ocean cyclone seasons: 1975, 1976
