= 1977–78 Australian region cyclone season =

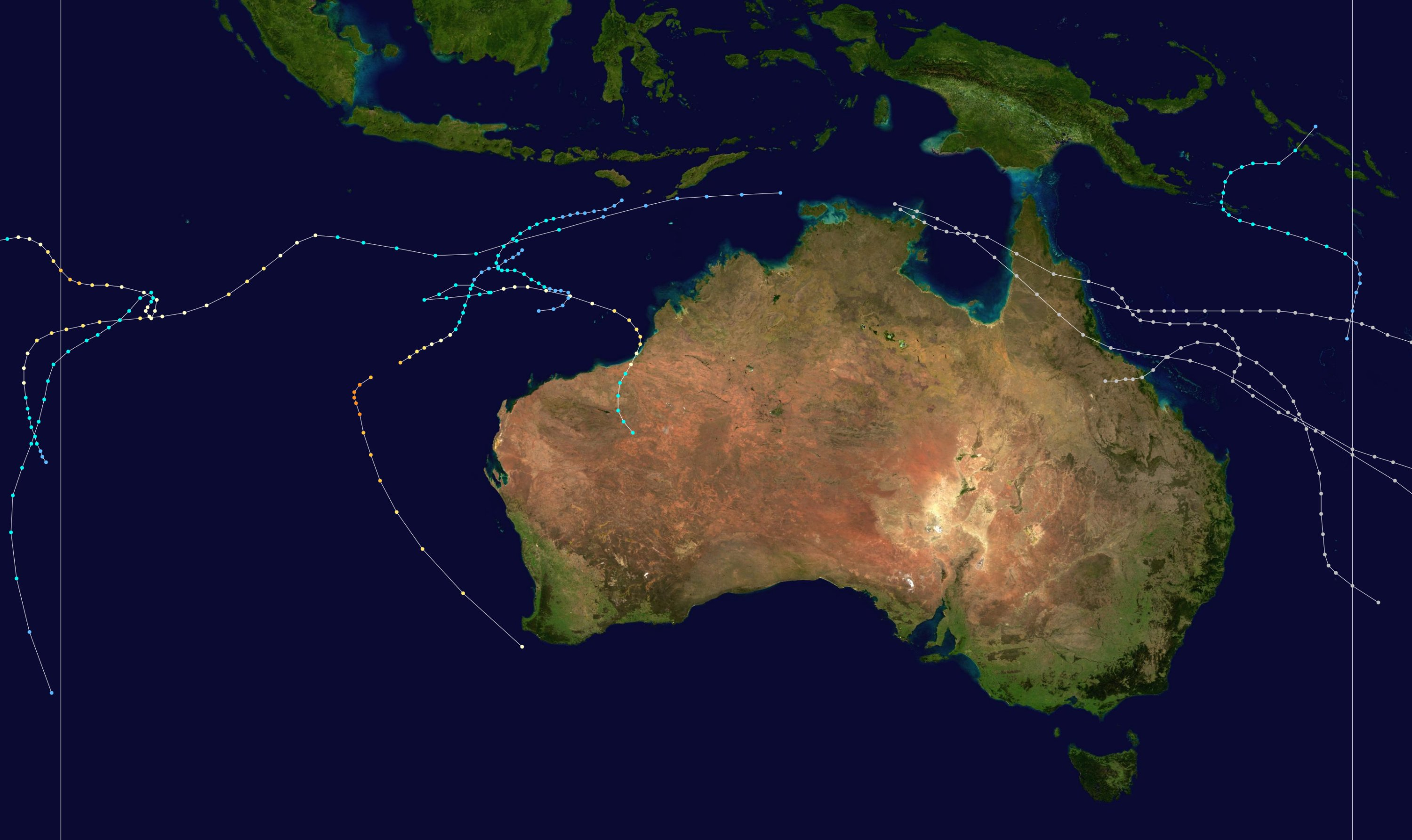
- Season summary map

Seasonal boundaries
- First system formed: 6 November 1977
- Last system dissipated: 11 April 1978

Strongest storm
- Name: Alby
  - Maximum winds: 205 km/h (125 mph) (10-minute sustained)
  - Lowest pressure: 930 hPa (mbar)

Seasonal statistics
- Tropical lows: 9
- Tropical cyclones: 9
- Severe tropical cyclones: 4
- Total fatalities: >5
- Total damage: $45.05 million (1978 USD)

Related articles
- 1977–78 South Pacific cyclone season; 1977–78 South-West Indian Ocean cyclone season

The 1977–78 Australian region cyclone season was a below average tropical cyclone season.

== Systems ==
=== Tropical Cyclone Tom ===
- Category 2 tropical cyclone (Australian scale)
- Tropical storm (SSHWS)
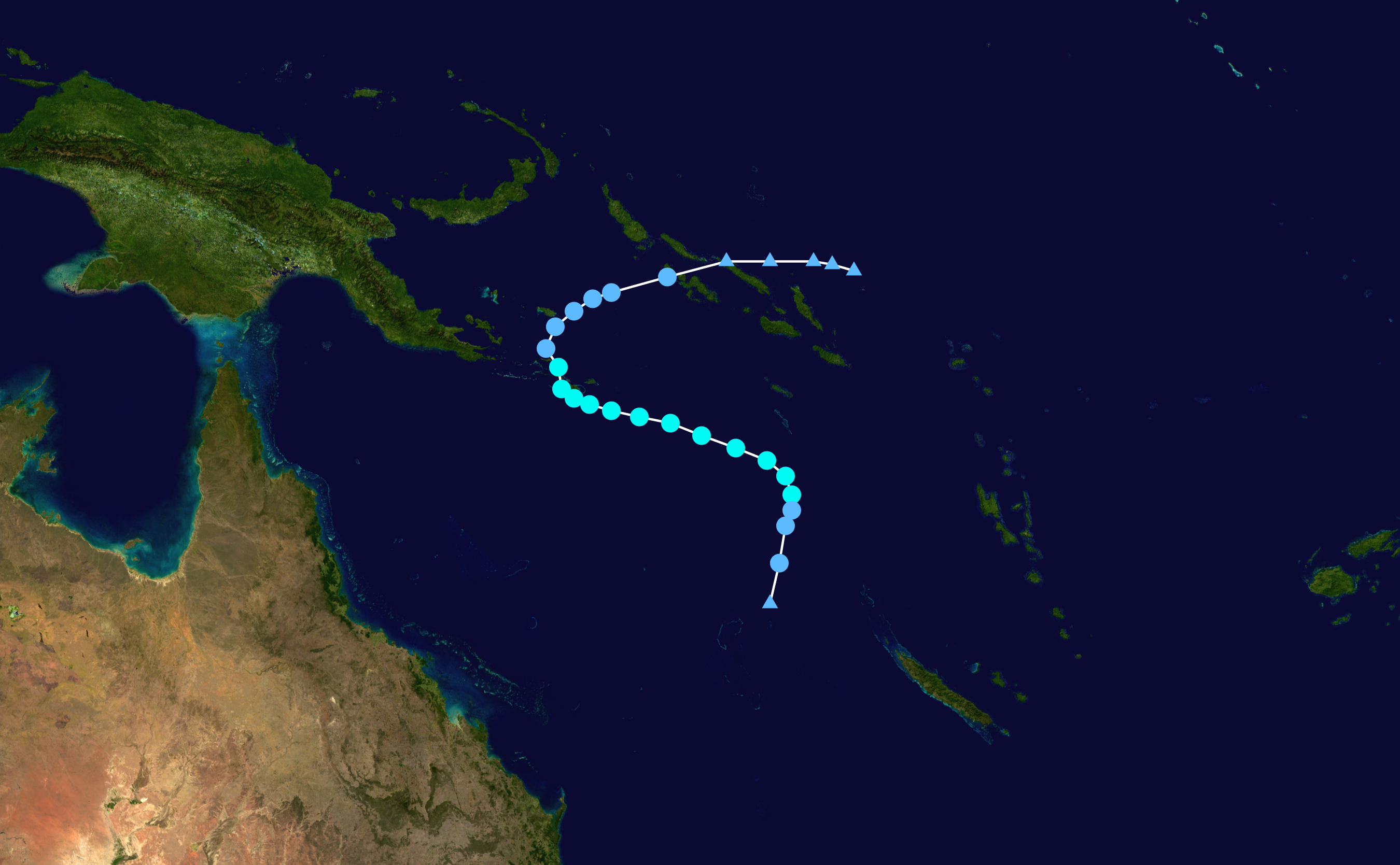
- Duration: 6 November – 11 November
- Peak intensity: 95 km/h (60 mph) (10-min); 990 hPa (mbar)

=== Tropical Cyclone Sam–Celimene ===
- Category 2 tropical cyclone (Australian scale)
- Tropical storm (SSHWS)
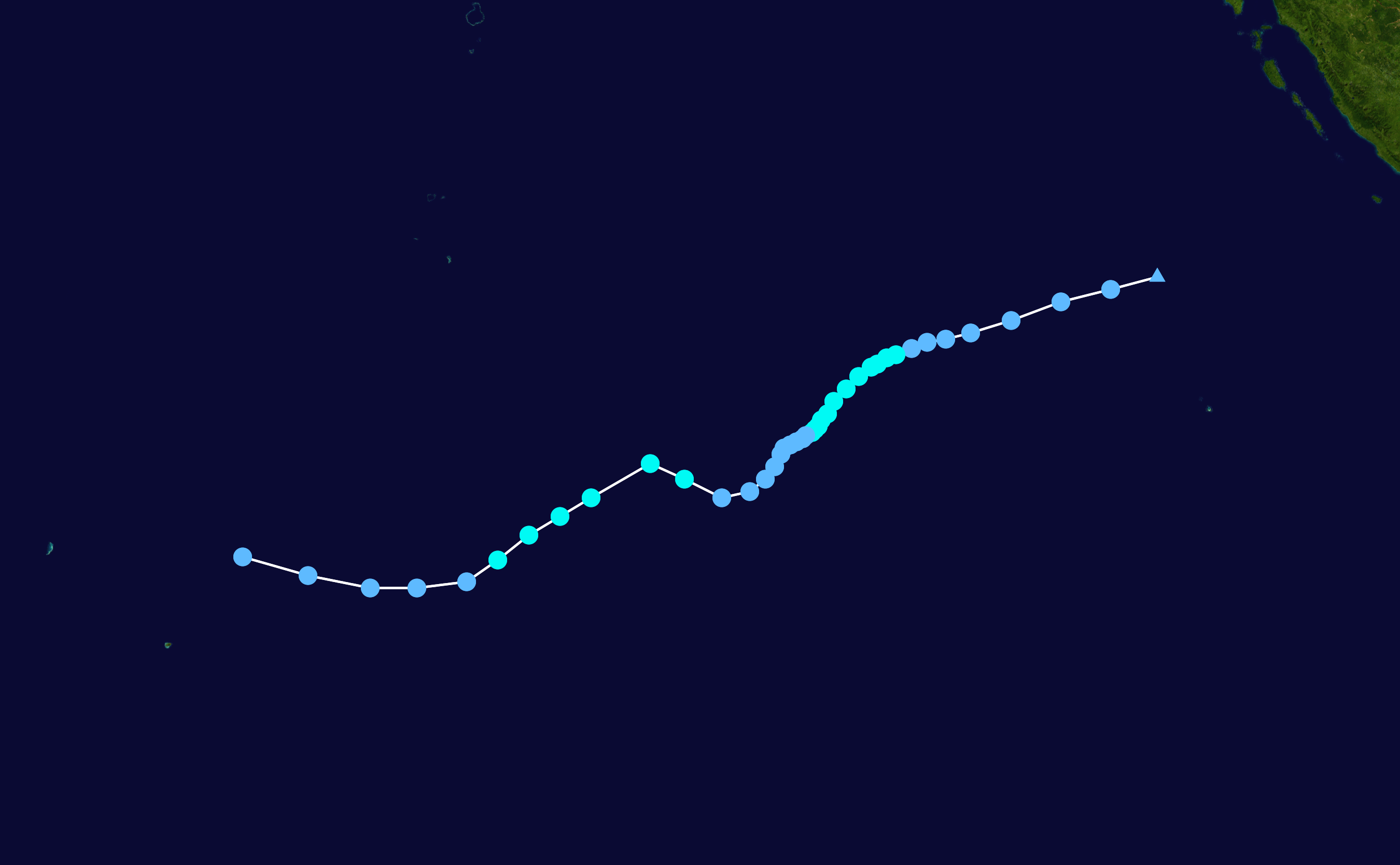
- Duration: 13 December – 14 December (exited basin)
- Peak intensity: 95 km/h (60 mph) (10-min); 1003 hPa (mbar)

=== Severe Tropical Cyclone Trudy ===
- Category 4 severe tropical cyclone (Australian scale)
- Category 2 tropical cyclone (SSHWS)
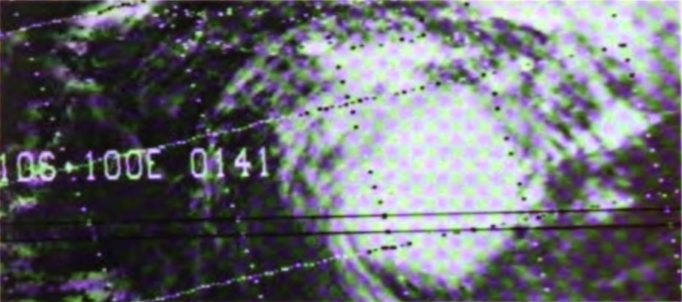
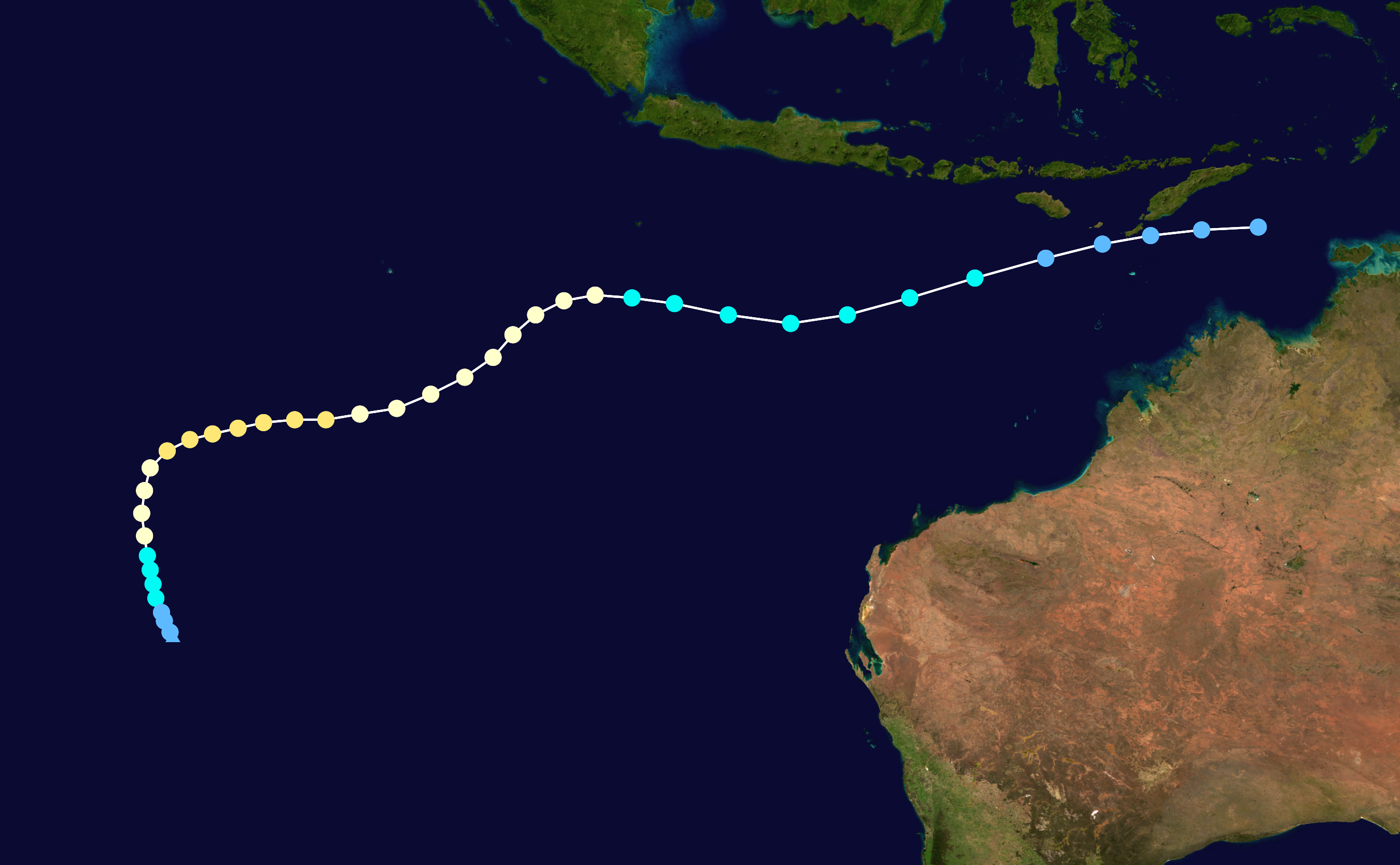
- Duration: 10 January – 20 January
- Peak intensity: 165 km/h (105 mph) (10-min); 954 hPa (mbar)

=== Severe Tropical Cyclone Vern ===
- Category 3 severe tropical cyclone (Australian scale)
- Category 1 tropical cyclone (SSHWS)
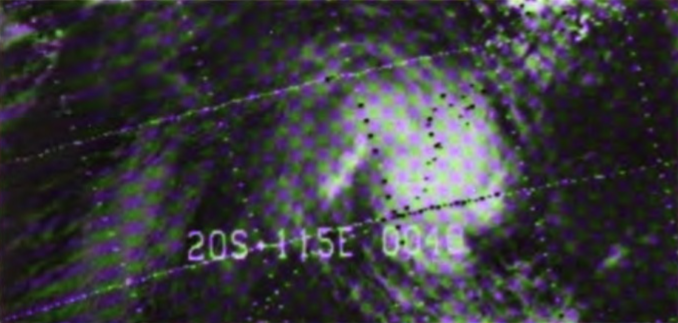
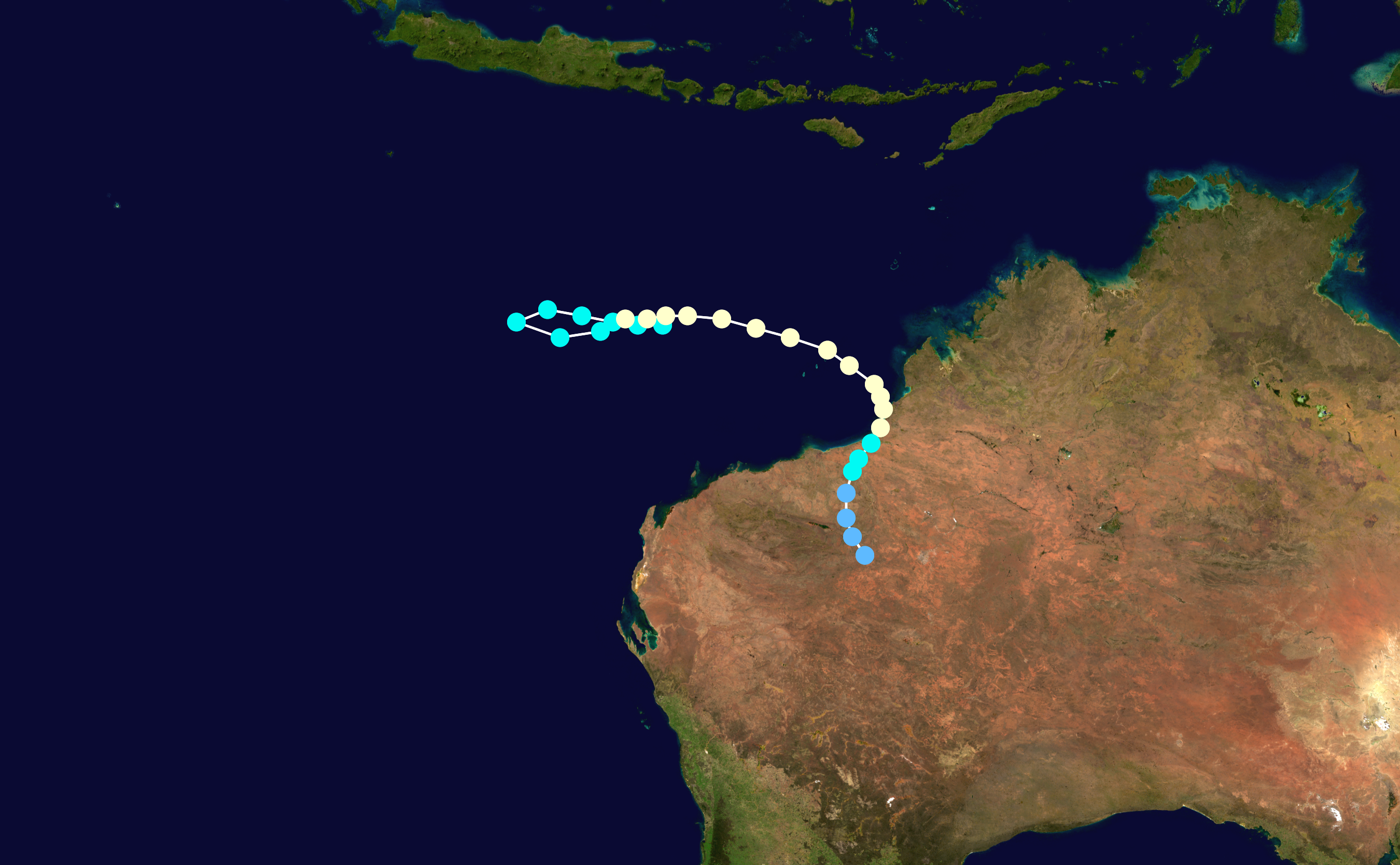
- Duration: 27 January – 3 February
- Peak intensity: 150 km/h (90 mph) (10-min); 964 hPa (mbar)

Cyclone Vern formed on 27 January from one of several low pressure centres within a trough that extended from the Cocos Islands eastward across northern Australia to Queensland. Over the period of a couple days, the strong northwesterly monsoonal flow to the north of the trough interacted with the strengthening easterly winds of a high-pressure area moving into the Great Australian Bight. As a result, one of the lows rapidly deepening into a tropical cyclone off the Kimberley coast. After initially moving tracking westward out to sea, the storm executed an anticyclonic loop and proceeded to move eastward. Then, early on 31 January, while located about 250 km (155 mi) northwest of Broome, Vern took a sharp turn toward the southeast then south. It continued in that general direction until it made landfall near Anna Plains at about 03:00 GMT, 1 February, with winds of about 145 km/h (90 mph). Inland, the system tracked southwestward then to the south again, causing flooding and minor damage, before dissipating on 3 February over the Pilbara.

=== Tropical Cyclone Gwen ===
- Category 2 tropical cyclone (Australian scale)
- Tropical storm (SSHWS)
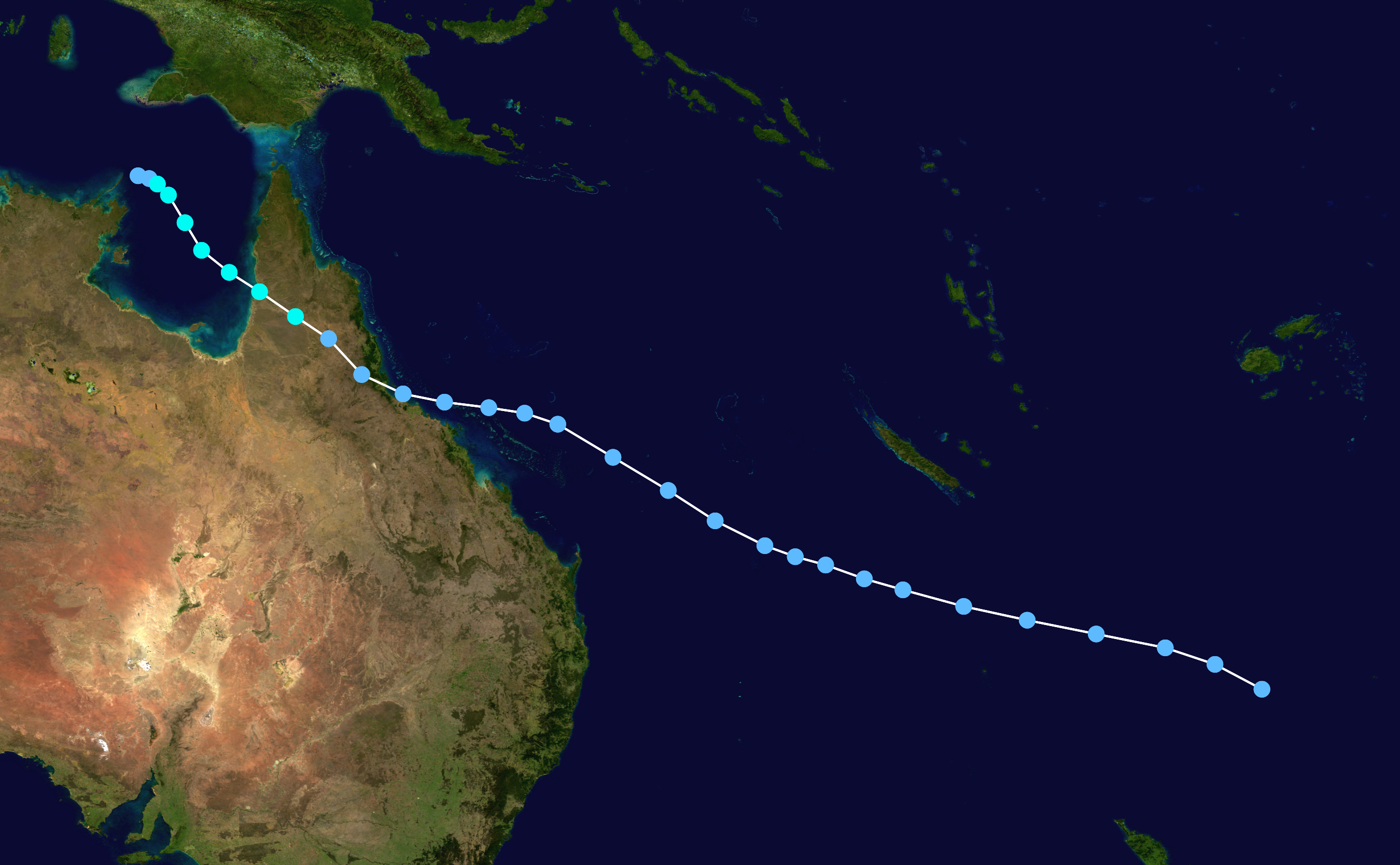
- Duration: 25 February – 27 February
- Peak intensity: 95 km/h (60 mph) (10-min); 987 hPa (mbar)

=== Severe Tropical Cyclone Winnie ===
- Category 4 severe tropical cyclone (Australian scale)
- Category 3 tropical cyclone (SSHWS)
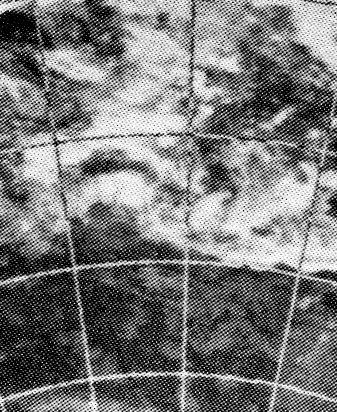
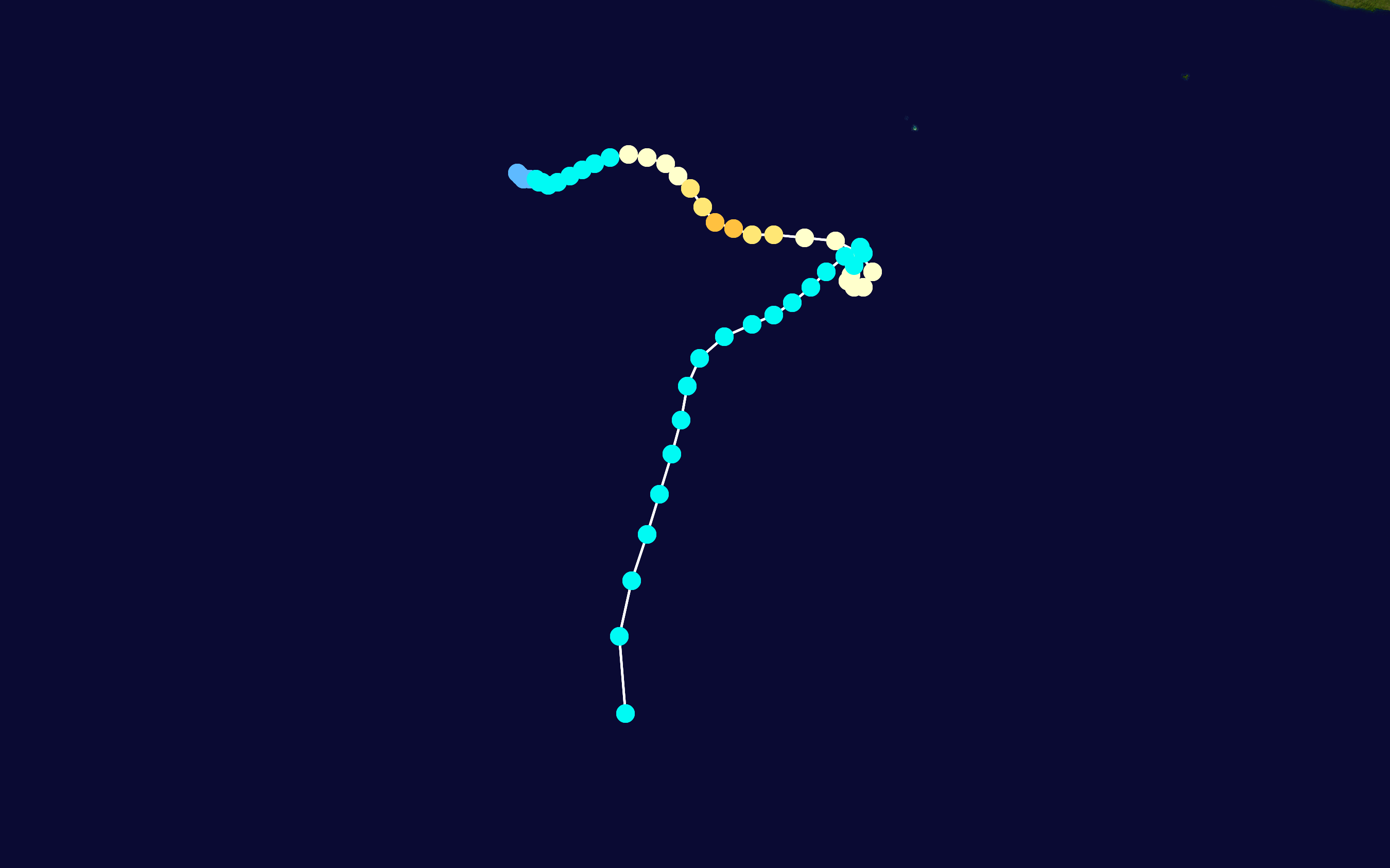
- Duration: 16 March – 29 March
- Peak intensity: 185 km/h (115 mph) (10-min); 945 hPa (mbar)

=== Severe Tropical Cyclone Alby ===
- Category 5 severe tropical cyclone (Australian scale)
- Category 4 tropical cyclone (SSHWS)
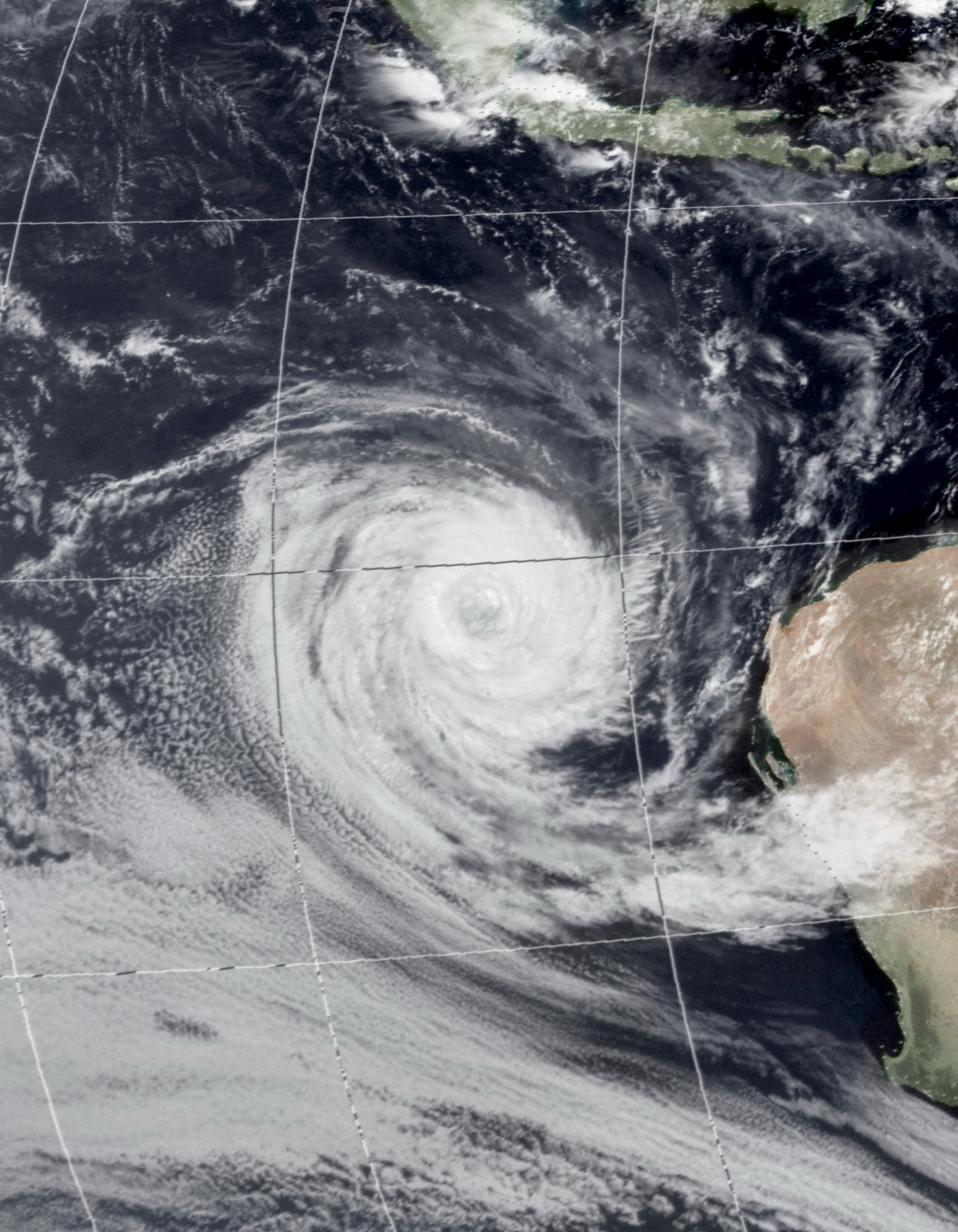
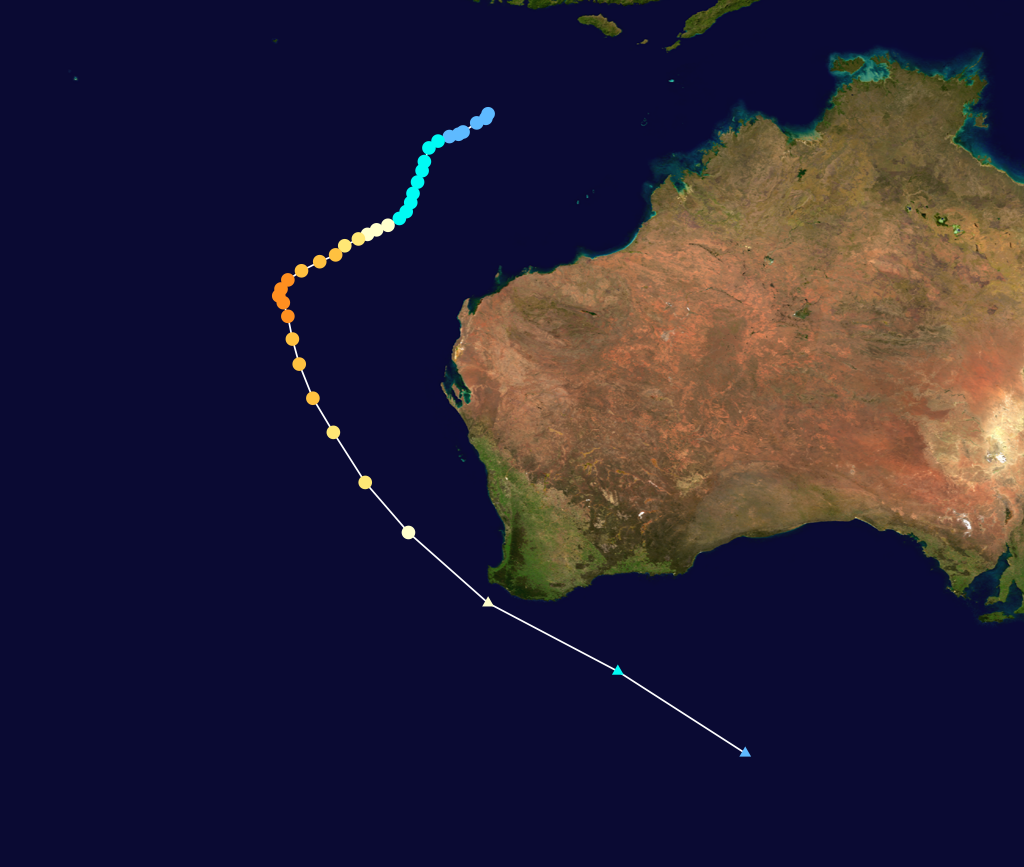
- Duration: 27 March – 5 April
- Peak intensity: 205 km/h (125 mph) (10-min); 930 hPa (mbar)

On 27 March, a tropical depression developed in the eastern Indian Ocean between Indonesia and Australia. It drifted to the southwest, and slowly strengthened into a tropical storm on 29 March. Alby continued slowly southwestward, and attained cyclone status on 30 March. The rate of intensification, which was slower earlier in its life, became more steady towards strengthening, and reached the equivalent of Category 3 status on 1 April. Tropical Cyclone Alby turned more to the south, and quickly reached a peak of 135 mph (217 km/h) later on 1 April. After maintaining its strength for 30 hours, Alby weakened as it turned to the southeast. Its forward momentum increased over the southeast Indian Ocean, and Alby was only an 85 mph (137 km/h) cyclone as it passed off the southwest coast of Australia on 4 April. It continued rapidly to the southeast, and became extra-tropical on 5 April while south of the continent.

On 4 April, Tropical Cyclone Alby passed close to the southwest corner of Western Australia, killing five people and causing widespread but mostly minor damage to the southwest. The damage bill was estimated to be $39 million (2003 dollars). A man was blown from the roof of a shed and a woman was killed by a falling pine tree. Another man was killed when a tree fell on the bulldozer he was operating and two men drowned when their dinghy overturned at Albany. Storm surge and destructive waves caused coastal inundation and erosion from Perth to Busselton, damaging the Busselton Jetty and Fremantle Harbour. Fires fanned by the strong winds burned an estimated 1,140 km^{2} (440 sq mi) of forest and farming land.

=== Tropical Cyclone Brenda ===
- Category 2 tropical cyclone (Australian scale)
- Tropical storm (SSHWS)
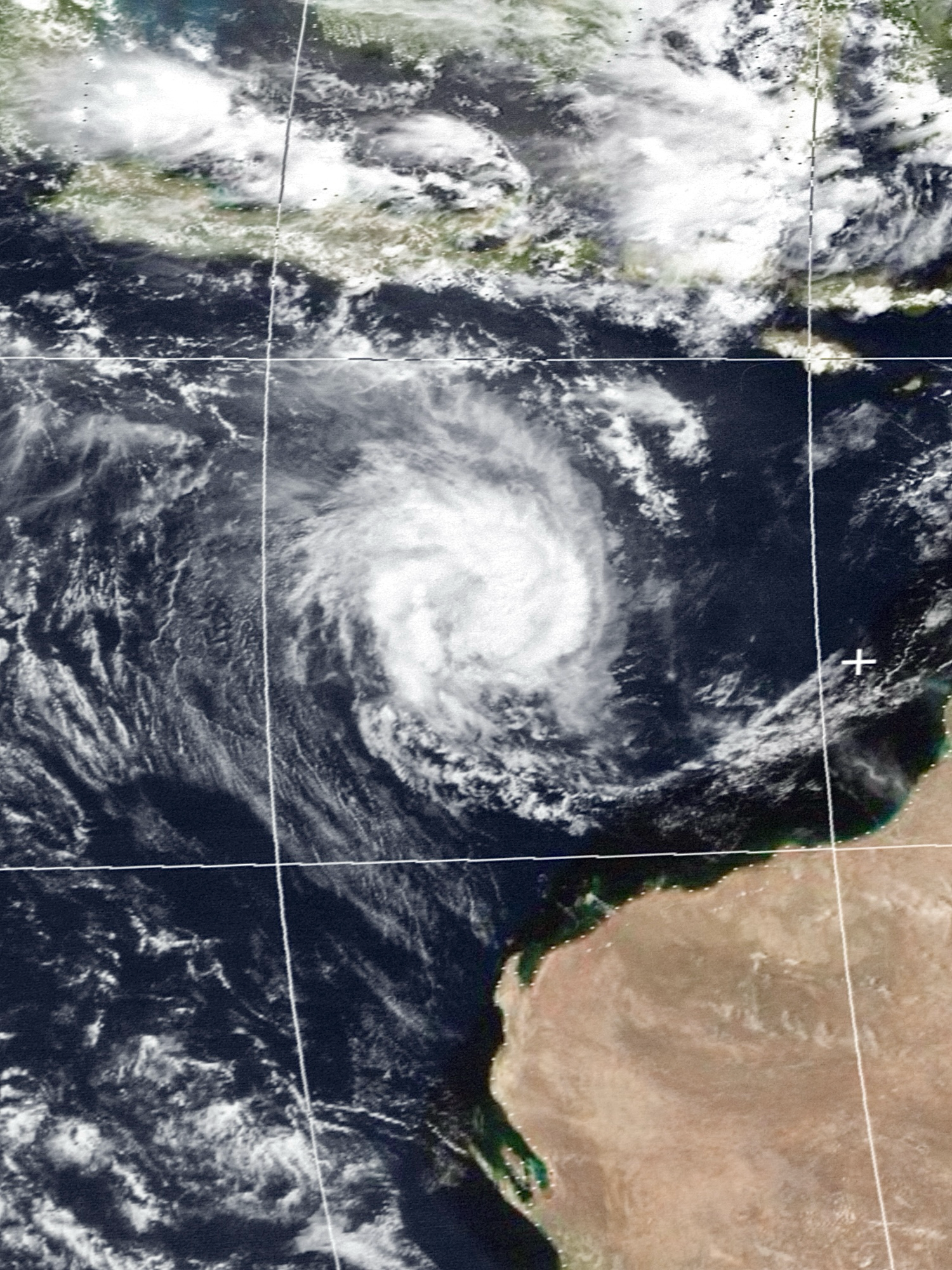
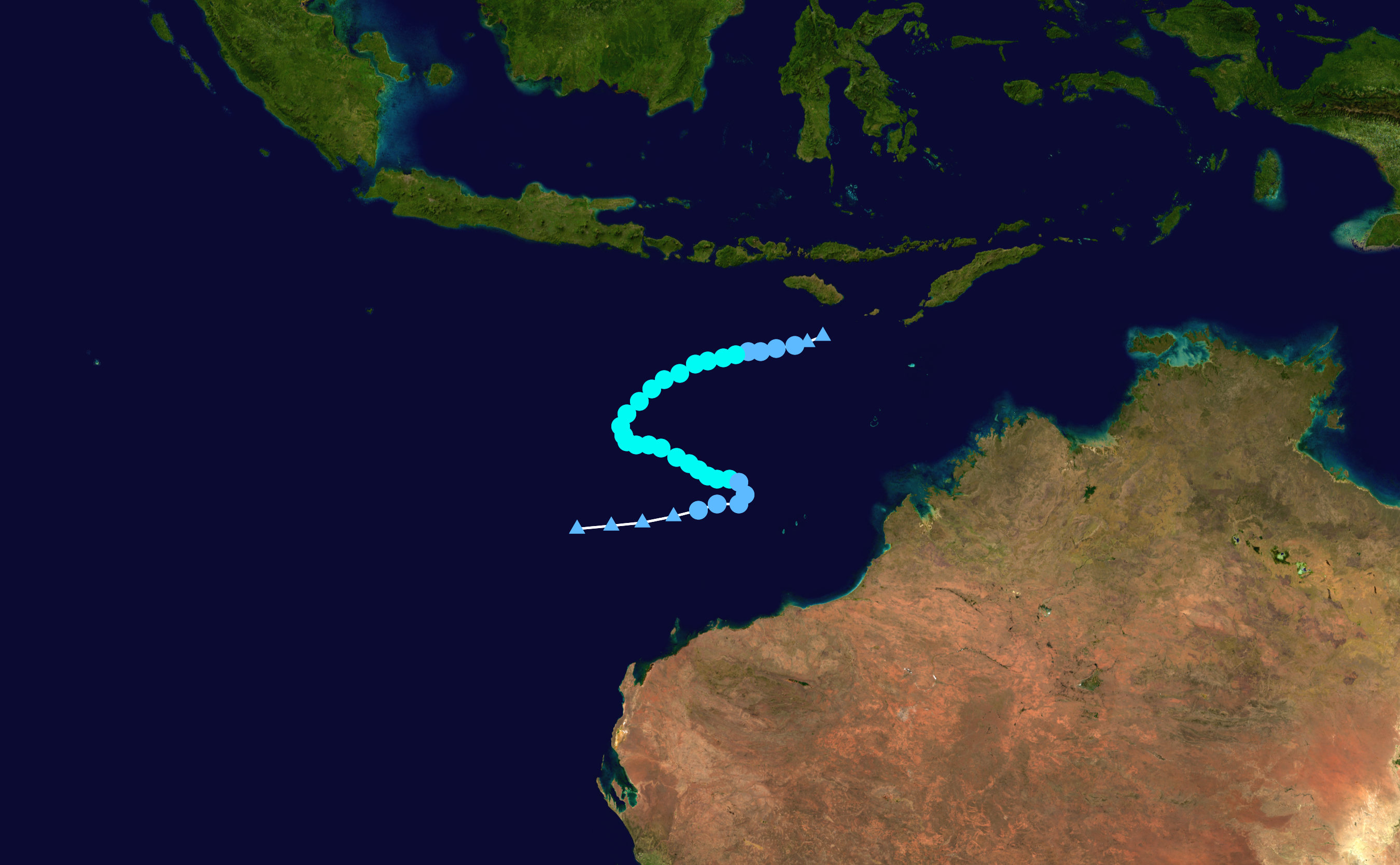
- Duration: 5 April – 14 April
- Peak intensity: 95 km/h (60 mph) (10-min); 990 hPa (mbar)

=== Tropical Cyclone Hal ===
- Category 2 tropical cyclone (Australian scale)
- Tropical storm (SSHWS)
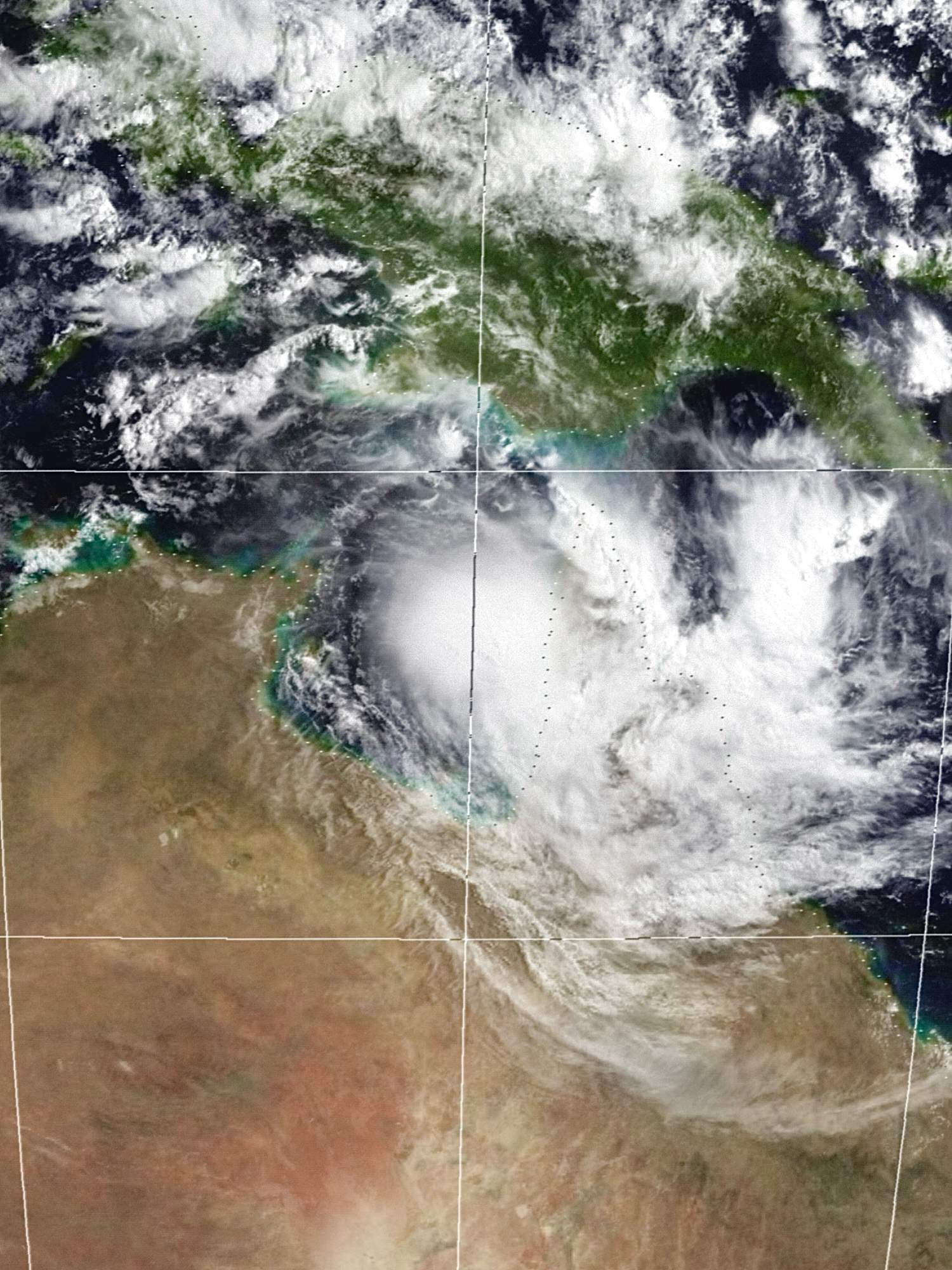
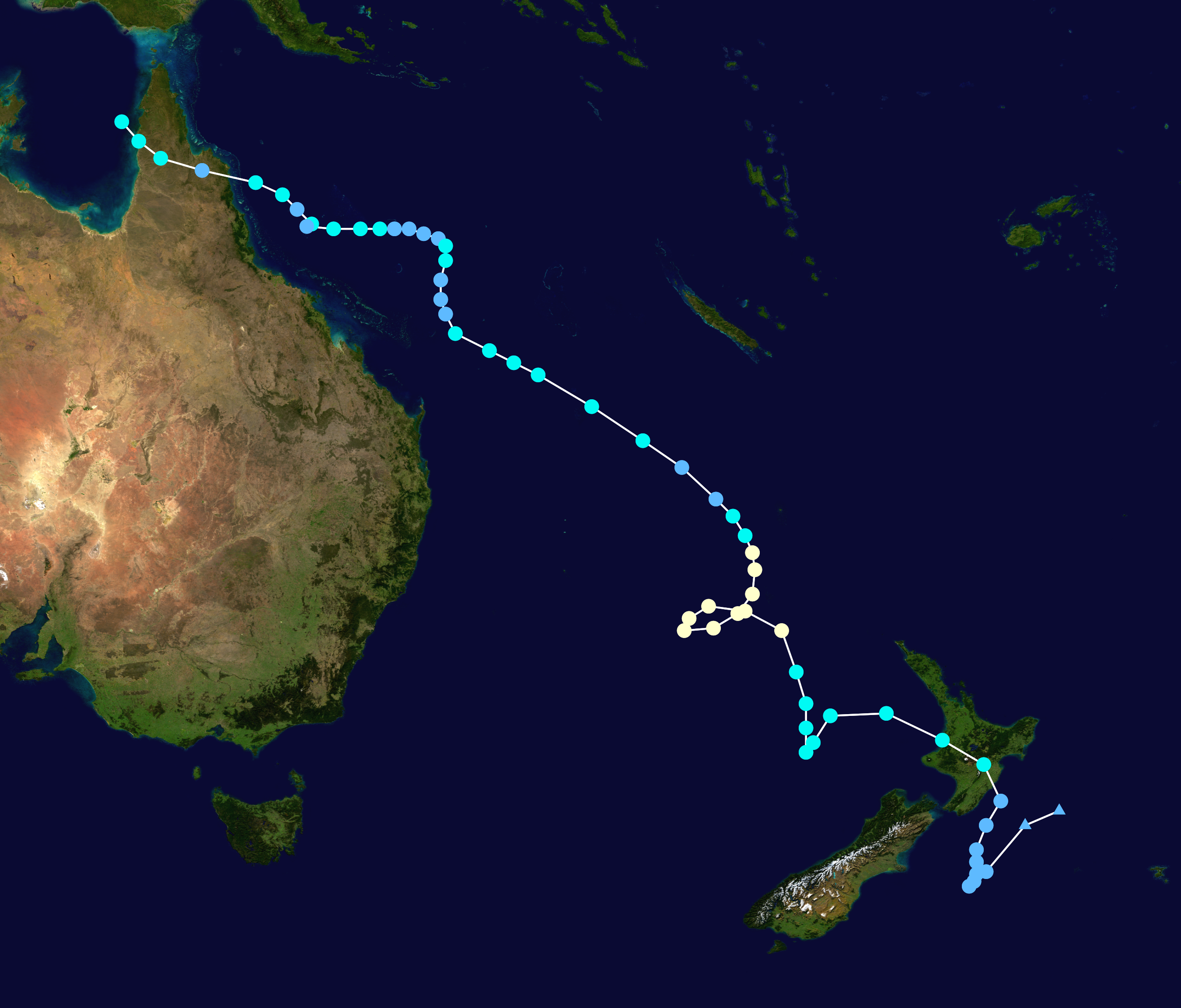
- Duration: 6 April – 11 April (exited basin)
- Peak intensity: 95 km/h (60 mph) (10-min); 985 hPa (mbar)

== See also ==
- Tropical cyclones in 1978
- Atlantic hurricane seasons: 1977, 1978
- Eastern Pacific hurricane seasons: 1977, 1978
- Western Pacific typhoon seasons: 1977, 1978
- North Indian Ocean cyclone seasons: 1977, 1978
