= 1977–78 South Pacific cyclone season =

Tropical cyclone season

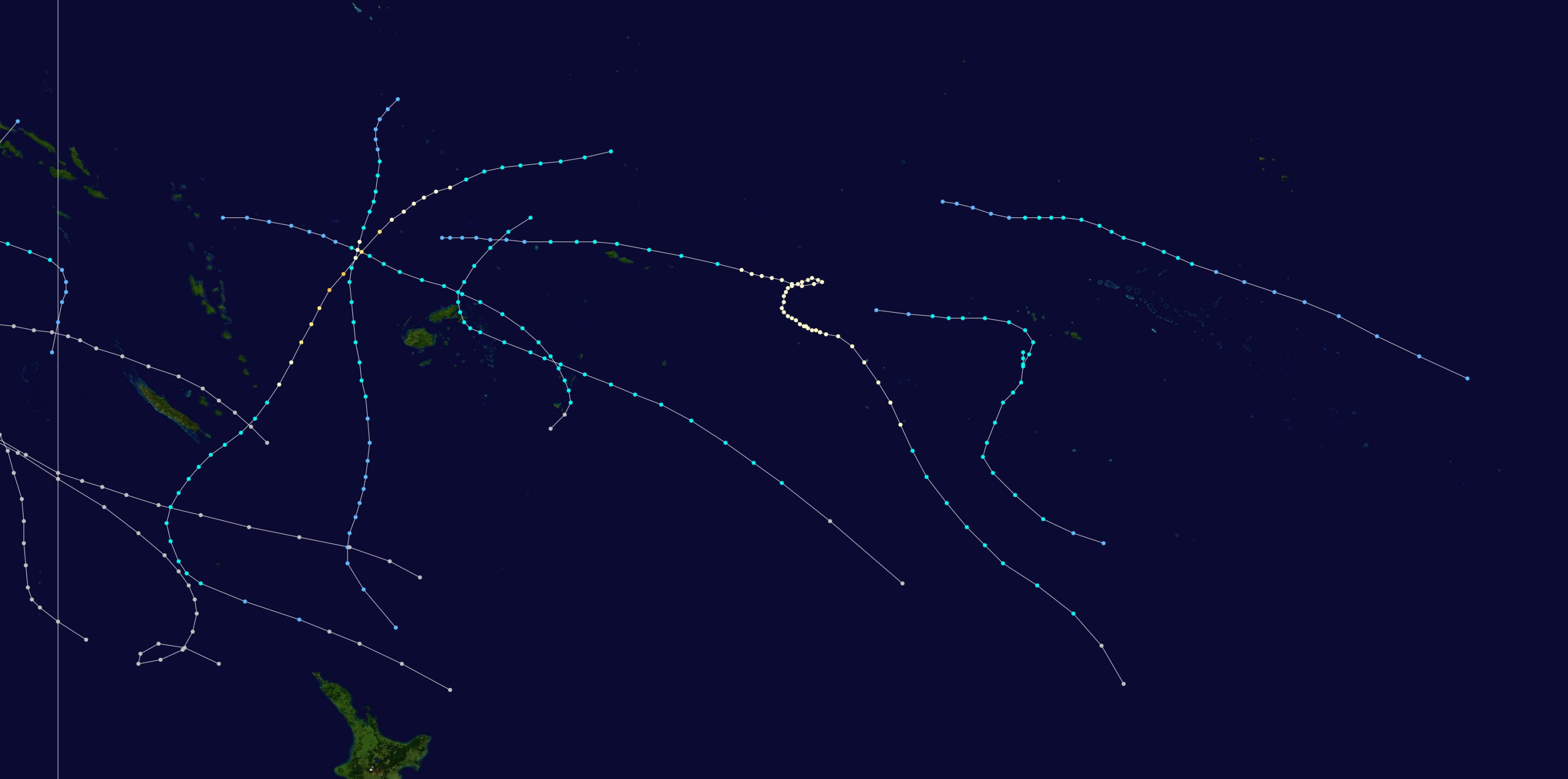
- Season summary map

Seasonal boundaries
- First system formed: November 24, 1977
- Last system dissipated: April 22, 1978

Strongest storm
- Name: Bob and Charles
  - Maximum winds: 155 km/h (100 mph) (10-minute sustained)
  - Lowest pressure: 945 hPa (mbar)

Seasonal statistics
- Total depressions: 8
- Tropical cyclones: 8
- Severe tropical cyclones: 3
- Total fatalities: Unknown
- Total damage: Unknown

Related articles
- 1977–78 South-West Indian Ocean cyclone season; 1977–78 Australian region cyclone season

The 1977–78 South-West Indian Ocean cyclone season was a near-average season, with eight tropical cyclones forming.

== Systems ==
=== Tropical Cyclone Steve ===
- Category 2 tropical cyclone (Australian scale)
- Category 1 tropical cyclone (SSHWS)
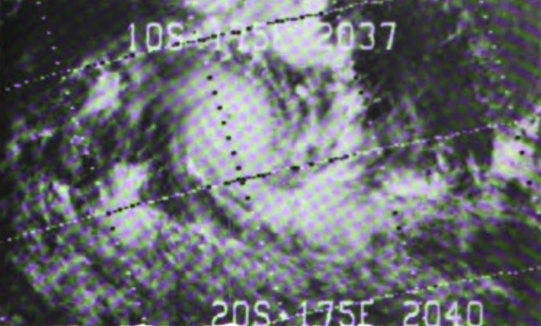
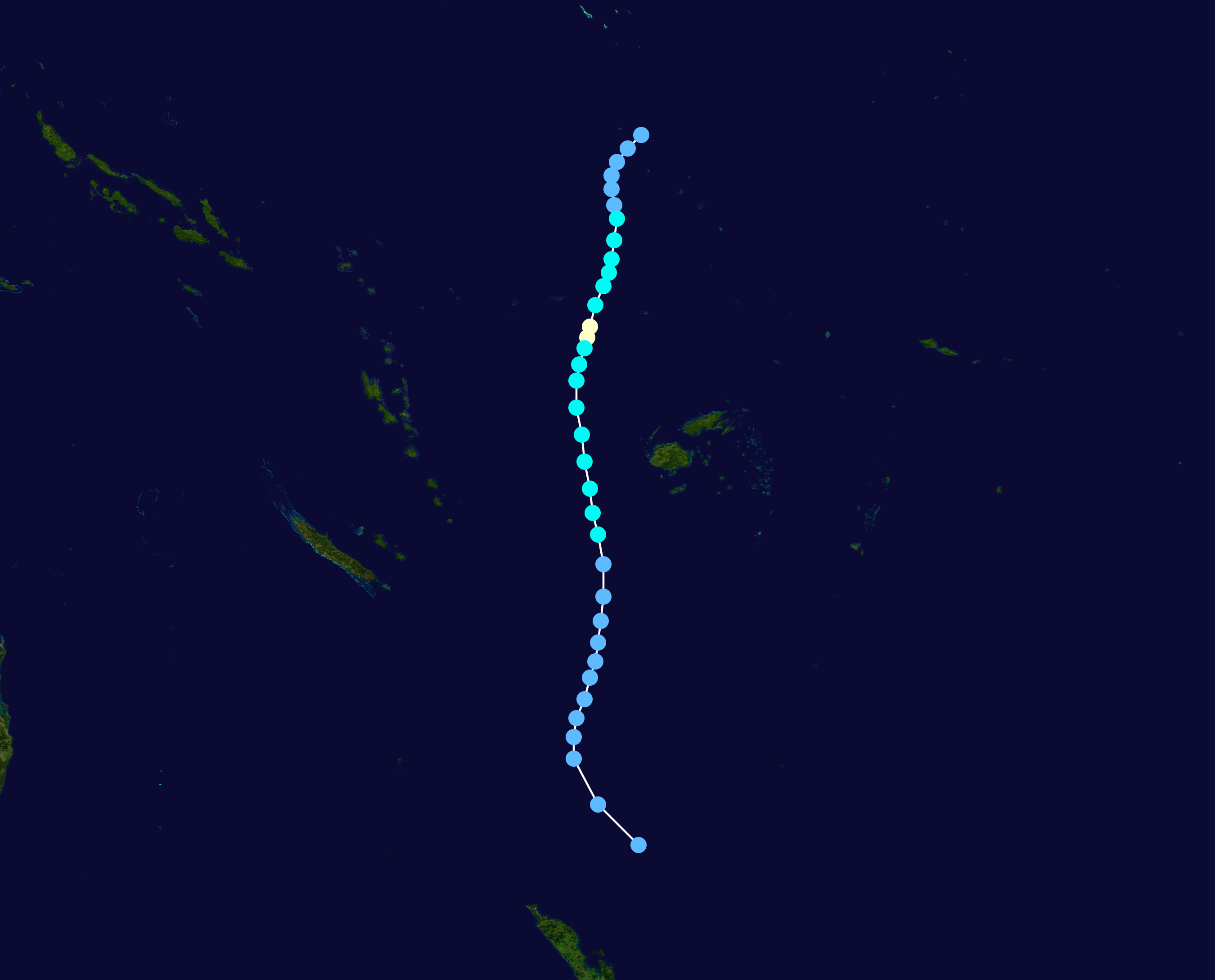
- Duration: November 24 – December 4
- Peak intensity: 110 km/h (70 mph) (10-min); 965 hPa (mbar)

=== Tropical Cyclone Tessa ===
- Category 1 tropical cyclone (Australian scale)
- Tropical storm (SSHWS)
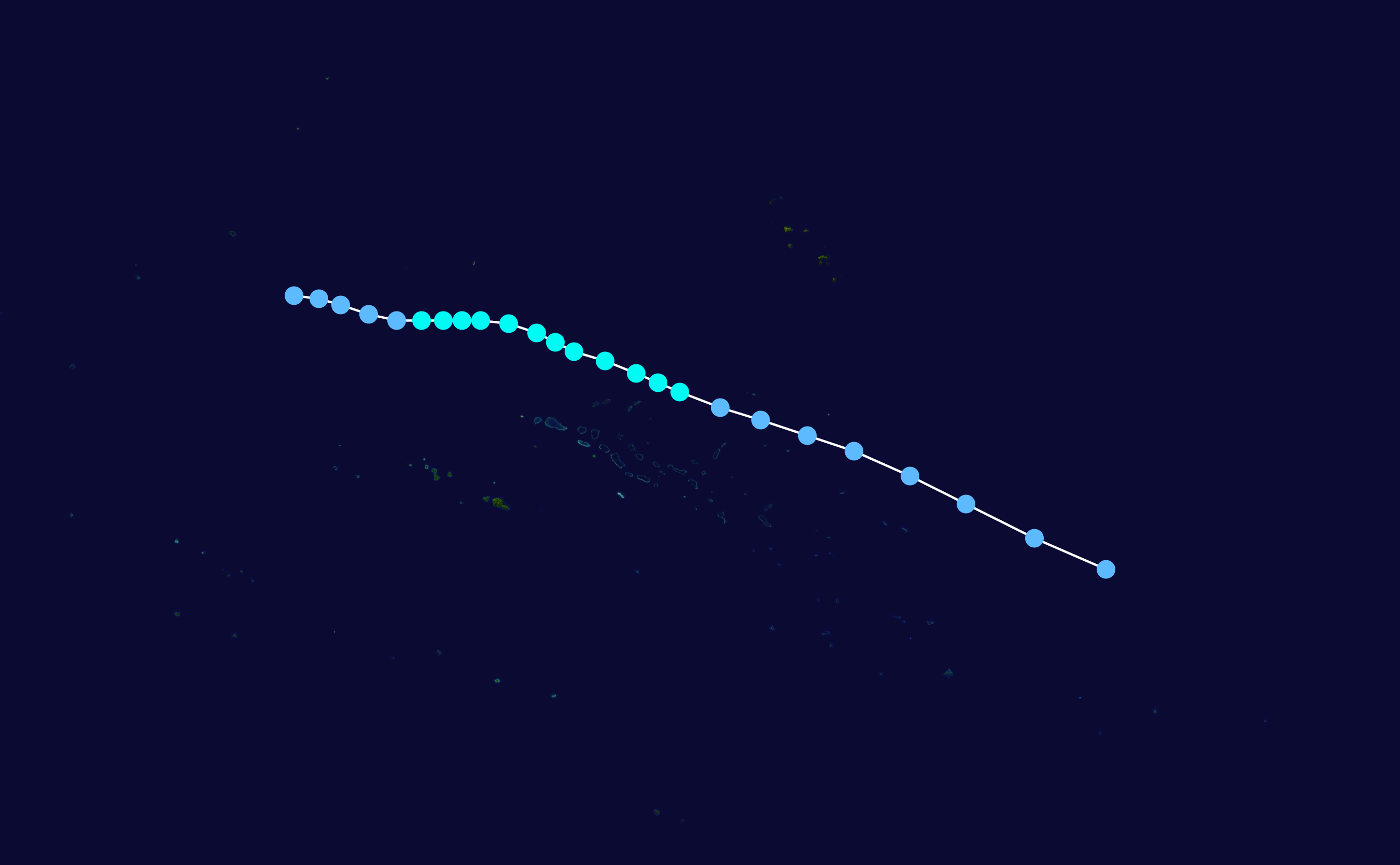
- Duration: December 5 – December 11
- Peak intensity: 75 km/h (45 mph) (10-min); 990 hPa (mbar)

Tessa precursor tropical depression was first noted on December 5, while it was located in the southern Line Islands of Kiribati. Over the next couple of days, the system moved southeastwards and gradually intensified, before it was named Tessa by the FMS during December 7.

During December 9, the system moved in between Puka Puka and Reao as it continued to weaken and move south-eastwards towards the Gambier Islands. The system was last noted during December 11, while it was located about 590 km (365 mi) to the northeast of Adams Town in the Pitcairn Islands. As the system moved through the Tuamotu Islands of French Polynesia, Tessa caused significant precipitation over the islands, with the Puka Puka weather station recording a 24-hour rainfall total of 154.2 mm (6.07 in) during December 8.

=== Tropical Cyclone Anne ===
- Category 2 tropical cyclone (Australian scale)
- Tropical storm (SSHWS)
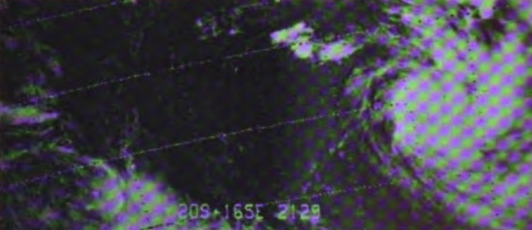
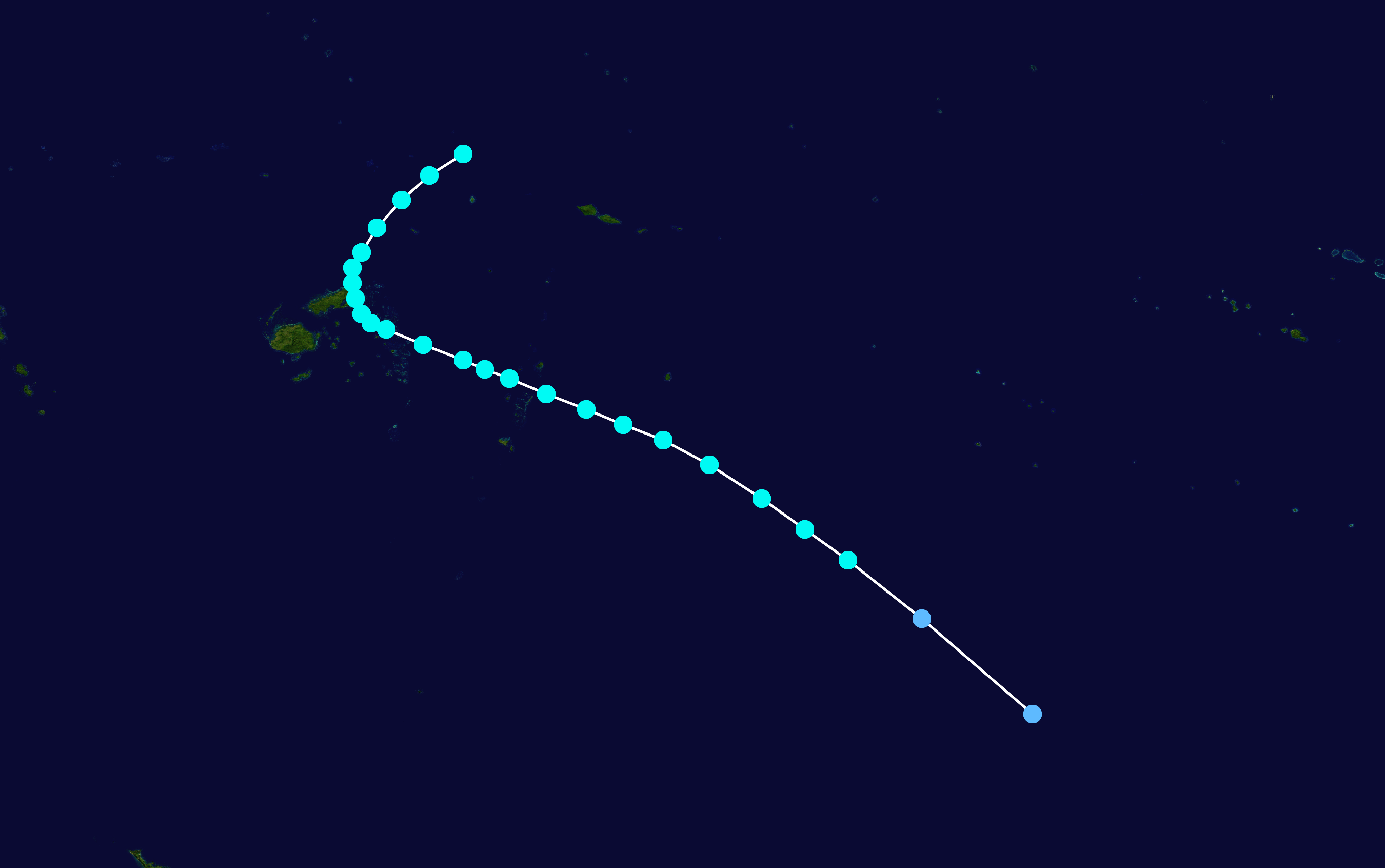
- Duration: December 23 – December 31
- Peak intensity: 100 km/h (65 mph) (10-min); 980 hPa (mbar)

For several days during the week building up to Christmas 1977, a tropical disturbance persisted about 925 km (575 mi) to the northeast of Fiji and to the northwest of Samoa. A distinct cyclonic circulation subsequently started to develop during December 23, while it was located about 740 km (460 mi) to the northeast of Vanua Levu. Over the next day the system moved south-westwards and passed within 75 km (45 mi) of Futuna, before it was named Anne by the FMS during December 24, as satellite pictures showed that a tropical cyclone was developing. During December 25, the winds were indirectly estimated to be off gale-force, as it passed south-westwards through the Fijian Islands.

=== Severe Tropical Cyclone Bob ===
- Category 3 severe tropical cyclone (Australian scale)
- Category 1 tropical cyclone (SSHWS)
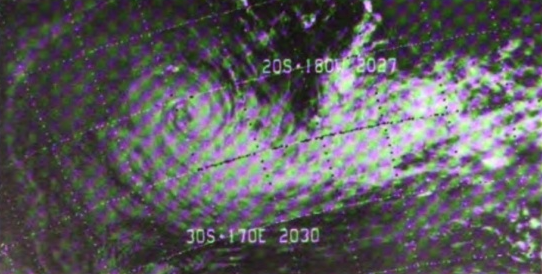
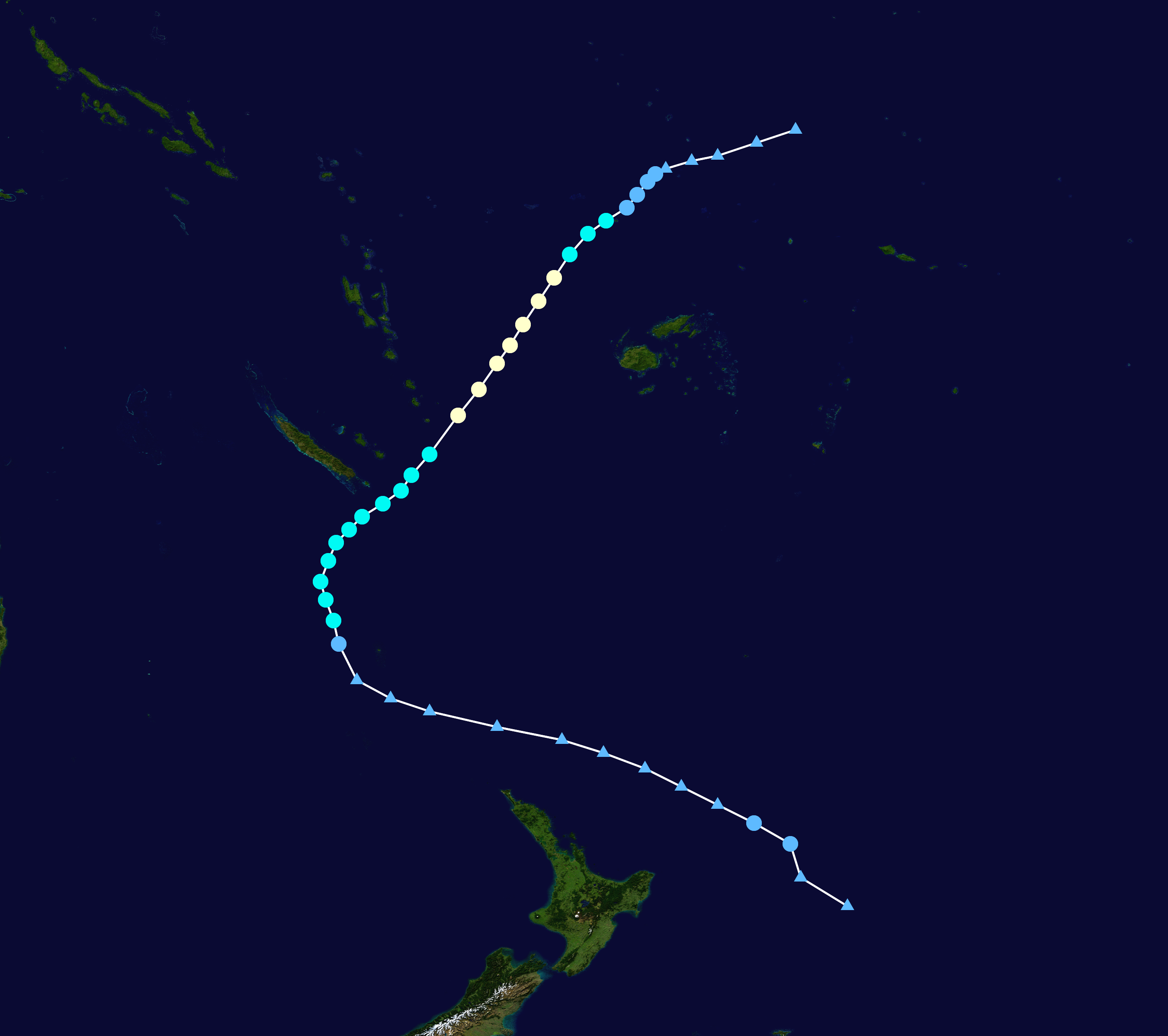
- Duration: December 31 – January 12
- Peak intensity: 155 km/h (100 mph) (10-min); 945 hPa (mbar)

=== Severe Tropical Cyclone Charles ===
- Category 3 severe tropical cyclone (Australian scale)
- Category 1 tropical cyclone (SSHWS)
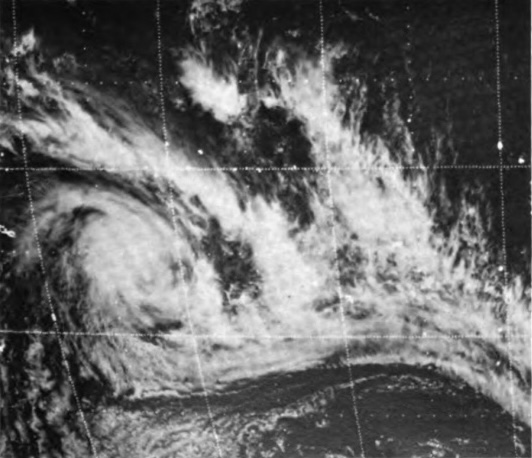
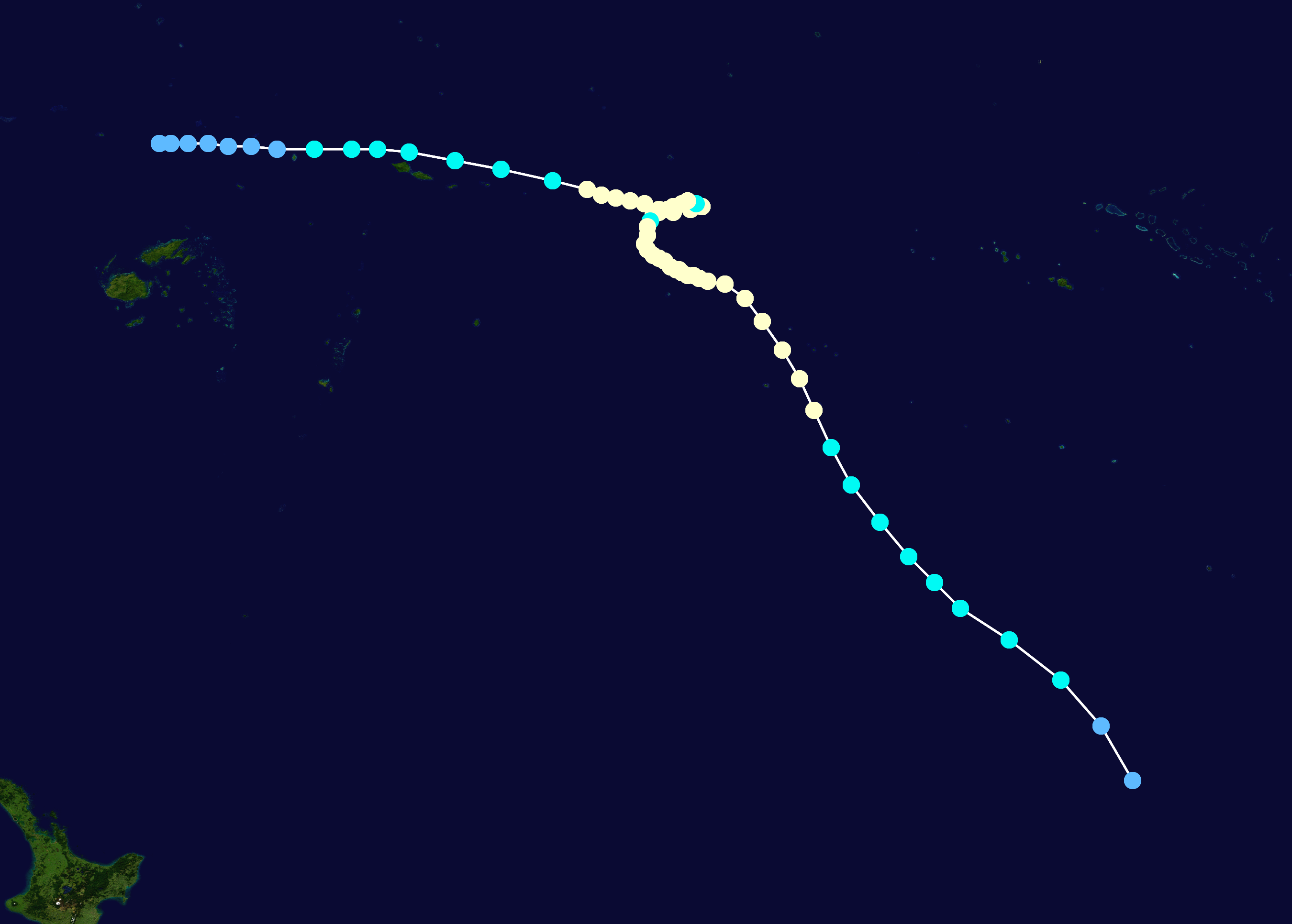
- Duration: February 13 – March 1
- Peak intensity: 155 km/h (100 mph) (10-min); 945 hPa (mbar)

=== Tropical Cyclone Diana ===
- Category 2 tropical cyclone (Australian scale)
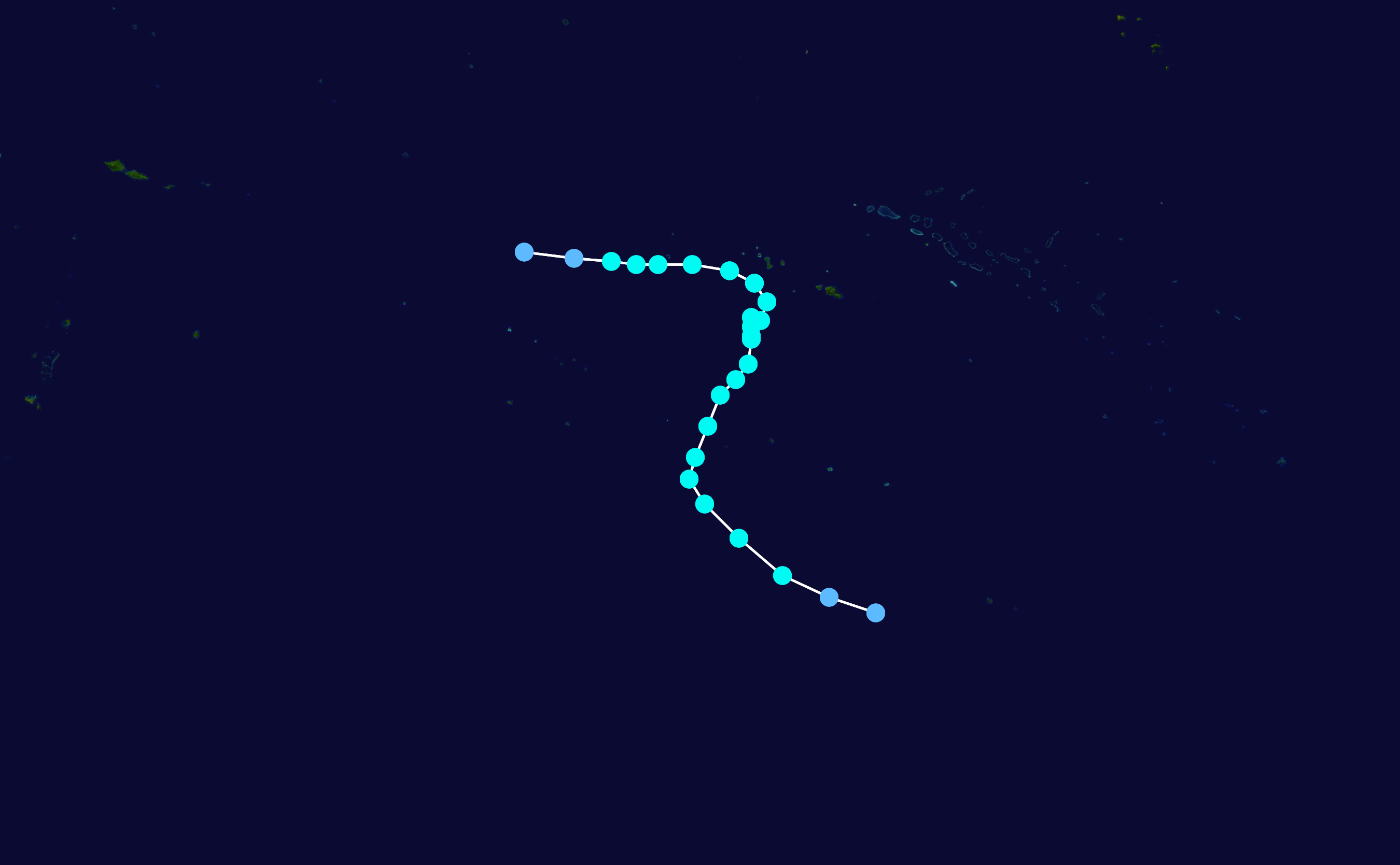
- Duration: February 15 – February 22
- Peak intensity: 100 km/h (65 mph) (10-min); 980 hPa (mbar)

During February 15, a tropical depression developed within the South Pacific Convergence Zone, to the west of French Polynesia's Society Islands. Over the next couple of days, the system moved eastwards towards Mopelia while gradually developing further, before it was named Diana by the FMS during February 16.

=== Tropical Cyclone Ernie ===
- Category 2 tropical cyclone (Australian scale)
- Tropical storm (SSHWS)
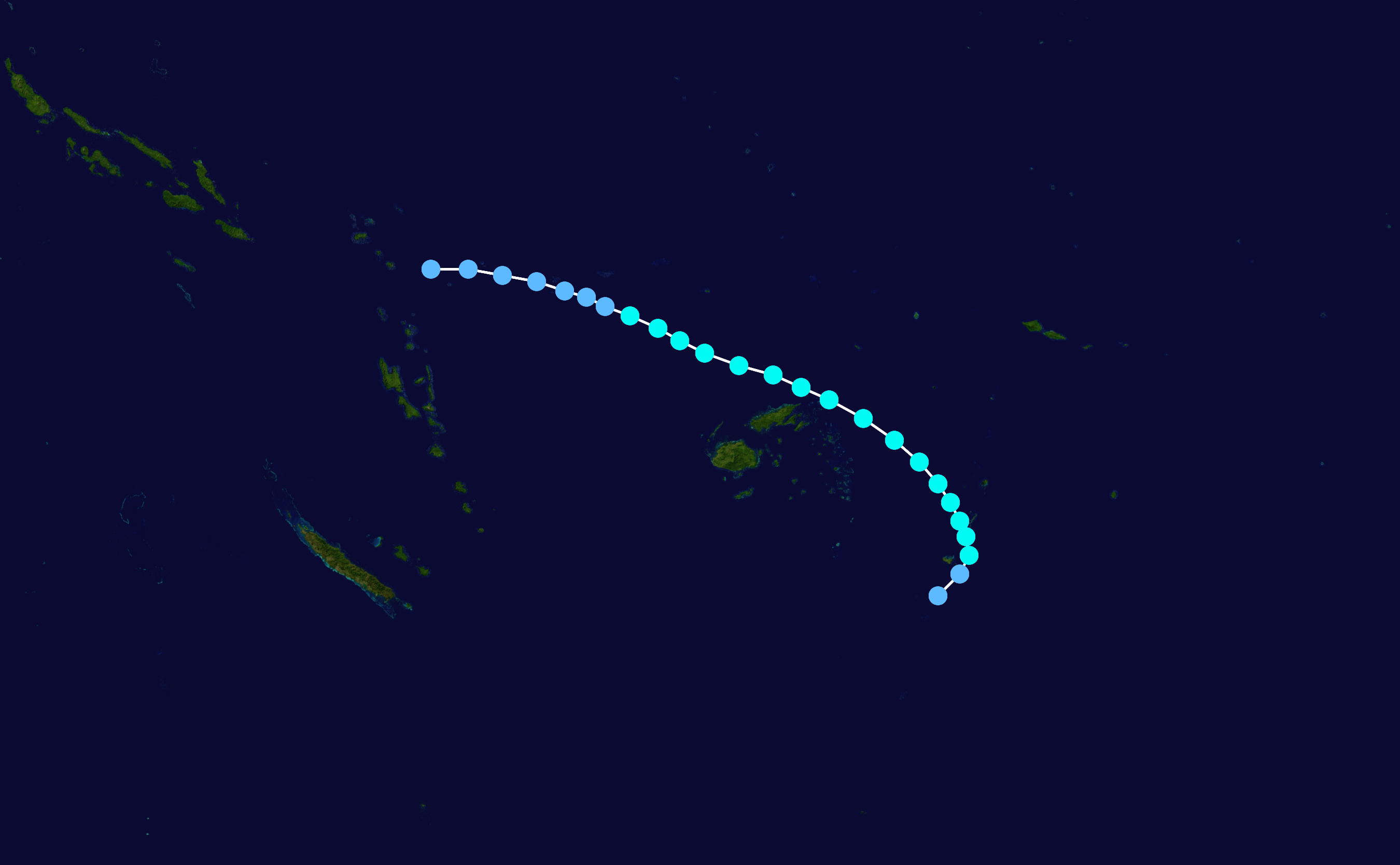
- Duration: February 17 – February 23
- Peak intensity: 100 km/h (65 mph) (10-min); 980 hPa (mbar)

During February 17, the FMS started to monitor a tropical depression that had developed, about 560 km (350 mi) to the northwest of Udu Point in Fiji. During that day, the system deepened as it moved south-eastwards towards Fiji before the FMS named it Ernie.

=== Severe Tropical Cyclone Hal ===
- Category 3 severe tropical cyclone (Australian scale)
- Category 1 tropical cyclone (SSHWS)
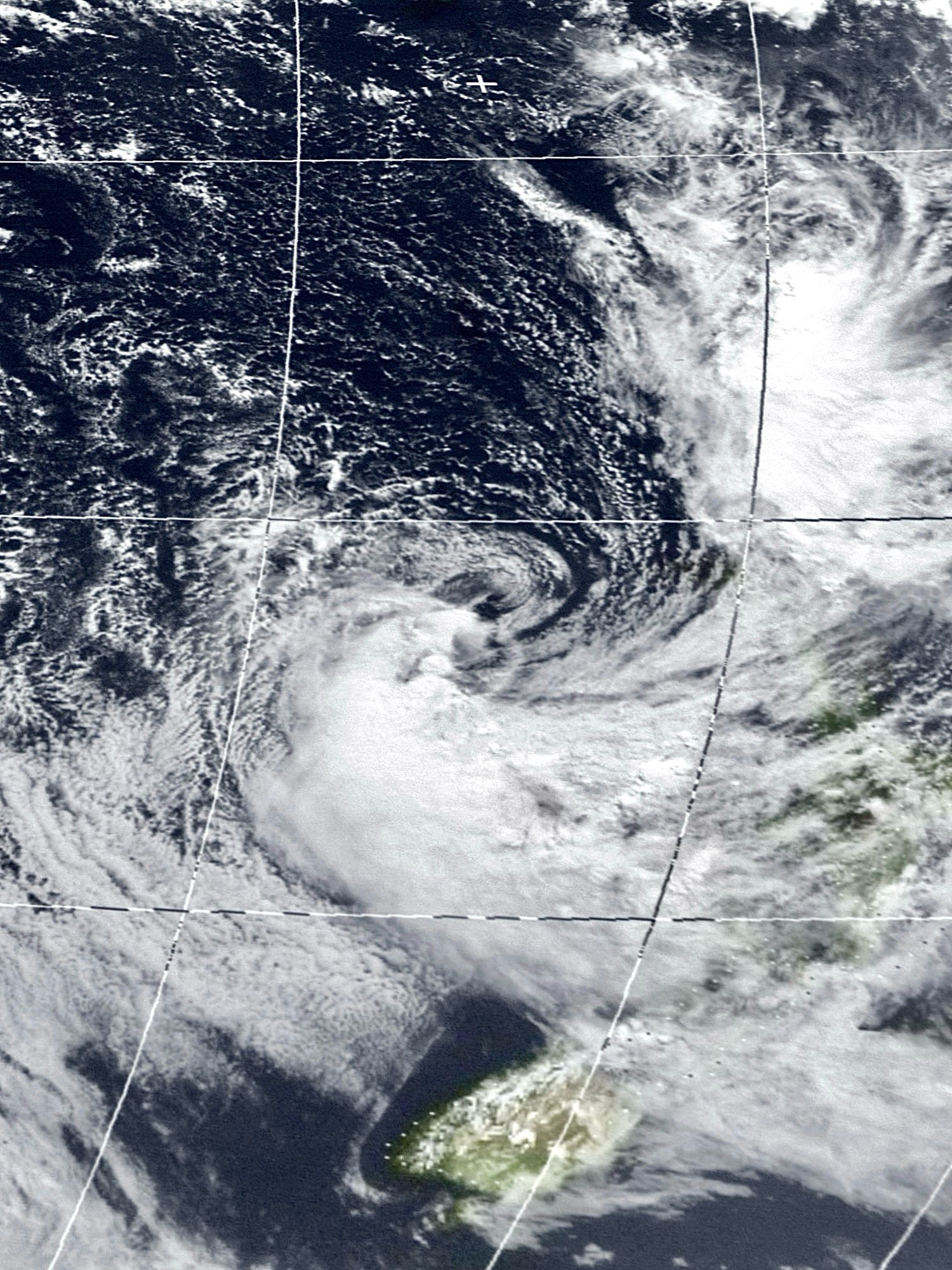
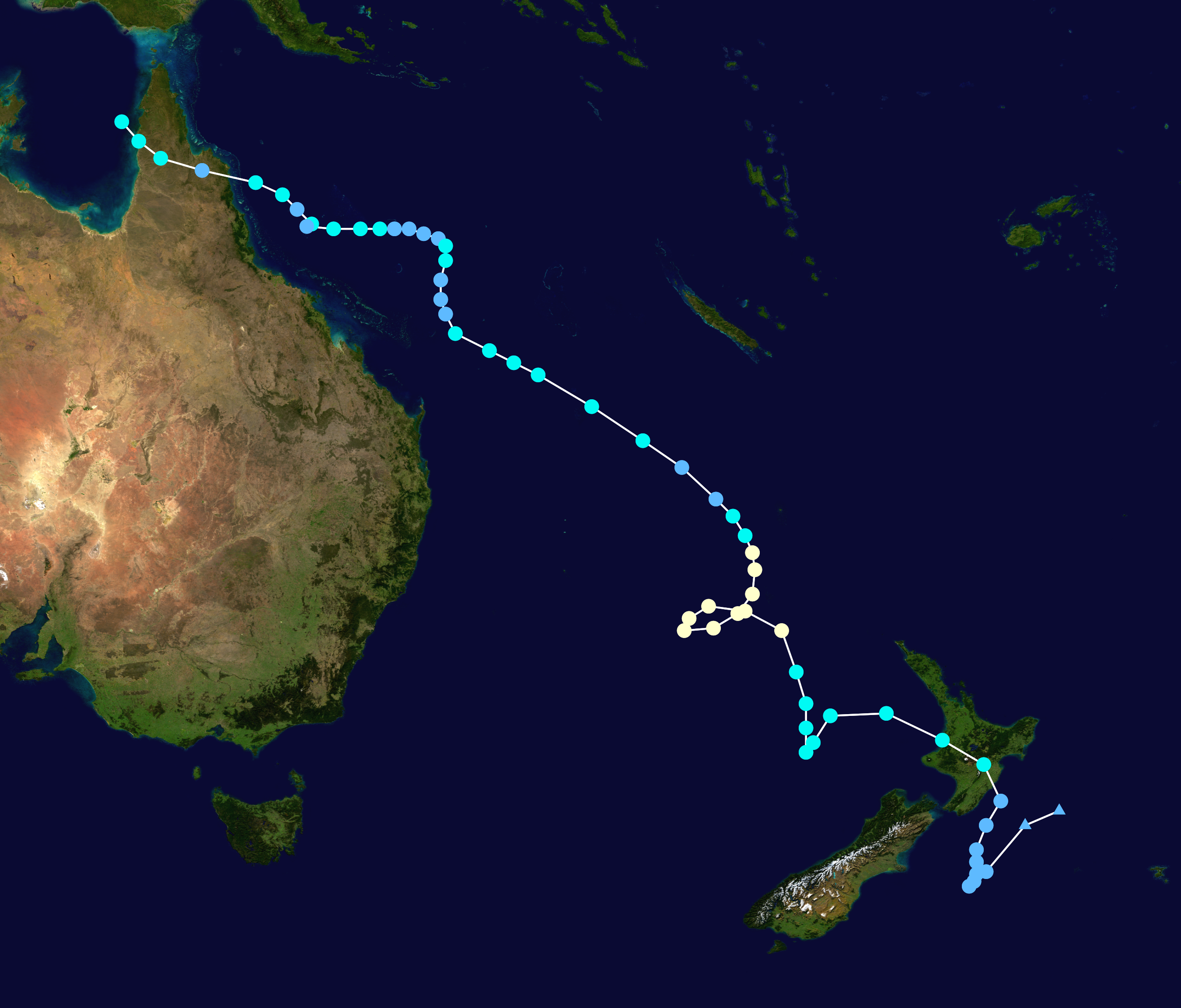
- Duration: April 13 (entered basin) – April 22
- Peak intensity: 130 km/h (80 mph) (10-min); 965 hPa (mbar)

== Season effects ==
Name	Dates	Peak intensity			Areas affected	Damage (USD)	Deaths	Ref(s).
Name	Dates	Category	Wind speed	Pressure	Areas affected	Damage (USD)	Deaths	Ref(s).
Steve	November 24 – December 4	Category 2 tropical cyclone	110 km/h (70 mph)	965 hPa (28.50 inHg)				
Tessa	December 5 – 11	Category 1 tropical cyclone	75 km/h (45 mph)	990 hPa (29.23 inHg)				
Anne	December 23 – 31	Category 1 tropical cyclone	100 km/h (65 mph)	980 hPa (28.94 inHg)				
Bob	December 31 – January 12	Category 3 severe tropical cyclone	155 km/h (100 mph)	945 hPa (27.91 inHg)				
Charles	February 13 – March 1	Category 3 severe tropical cyclone	155 km/h (100 mph)	945 hPa (27.91 inHg)				
Diana	February 15 – 22	Category 2 tropical cyclone	100 km/h (65 mph)	980 hPa (28.94 inHg)				
Ernie	February 17 – 23	Category 2 tropical cyclone	100 km/h (65 mph)	980 hPa (28.94 inHg)				
Hal	April 13 – 22	Category 3 severe tropical cyclone	130 km/h (80 mph)	965 hPa (28.50 inHg)				
Season aggregates
8 systems	November 24 – April 22		155 km/h (100 mph)	945 hPa (27.91 inHg)				

== See also ==
- Tropical cyclones in 1978
- Atlantic hurricane seasons: 1977, 1978
- Eastern Pacific hurricane seasons: 1977, 1978
- Western Pacific typhoon seasons: 1977, 1978
- North Indian Ocean cyclone seasons: 1977, 1978
