= Tropical cyclones in 1977 =

- GOES-2 timelapse of Hurricane Anita in the Gulf of Mexico

Year boundaries
- First system: Clarence
- Formed: January 1, 1977
- Last system: Bob
- Dissipated: December 31, 1977

Strongest system
- Name: Babe
- Lowest pressure: 905 mbar (hPa); 26.73 inHg

Longest lasting system
- Name: Hervea
- Duration: 21.75 days

Year statistics
- Total systems: 125
- Named systems: 64
- Total fatalities: Unknown
- Total damage: Unknown
Related articles
- 1977 Atlantic hurricane season
- 1977 Pacific hurricane season
- 1977 Pacific typhoon season
- 1977 North Indian Ocean cyclone season
- 1976–77 South-West Indian Ocean cyclone season
- 1977–78 South-West Indian Ocean cyclone season
- 1976–77 Australian region cyclone season
- 1977–78 Australian region cyclone season
- 1976–77 South Pacific cyclone season
- 1977–78 South Pacific cyclone season

During 1977, tropical cyclones formed within seven different tropical cyclone basins, located within various parts of the Atlantic, Pacific and Indian Oceans. During the year, a total of 125 tropical cyclones had formed this year to date, while a record low of 64 tropical cyclones were named.

The most active basin in the year was the Western Pacific, which, however, documented only 19 named systems, but had over 50 tropical depressions forming. Conversely, both the North Atlantic hurricane and North Indian Ocean cyclone seasons experienced very highly below the long-term average number of cyclones reaching tropical storm intensity in recorded history, both numbering 6, respectively. Activity across the southern hemisphere's three basins—South-West Indian, Australian, and South Pacific—was just almost spread evenly, with each region recording an average total of 12 tropical cyclones.

The costliest tropical cyclone of the year was Hurricane Anita in the Atlantic which struck Northern Mexico in very late August. Damages are still unknown to date, but most estimates say that Anita caused at least US$500 million in total damage. The deadliest tropical cyclone of the year was the 1977 Andhra Pradesh cyclone in the North Indian Ocean, which killed at least 10 thousand people in the state of Andhra Pradesh in India. The cyclone became the most intense cyclone to hit the state since reliable records began in 1891. It was also the third recorded Super Cyclonic Storm in the satellite era of the basin which began in 1960.

== Systems ==
=== January ===
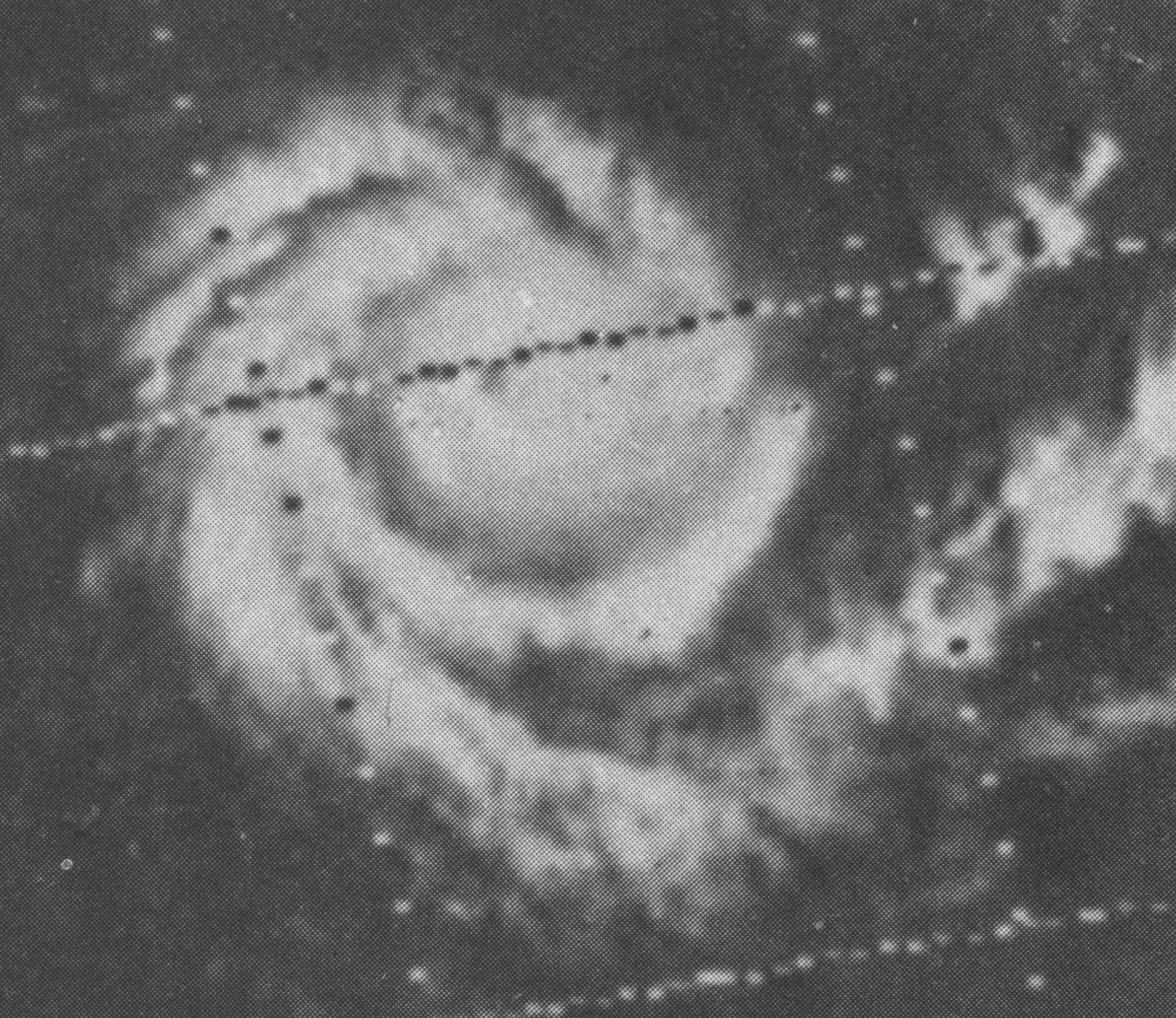
Cyclone Clarence

During January, a total of 9 tropical cyclones formed within the month with eight of those further intensifying to become official named systems. 1977 is one of only a few years to feature no storms forming in December of the previous year and dissipating in January of the listed year. Cyclone Clarence was the most intense of January, with pressure of 960 hPa, while Cyclone Irene was the strongest, with attained wind speeds of 150 kilometres per hour (93 mph).

Tropical cyclones formed in January 1977
Storm name	Dates active	Max wind km/h (mph)	Pressure (hPa)	Areas affected	Damage (USD)	Deaths	Refs
Clarence	January 1–13	130 (80)	960	St. Brandon, Réunion	Unknown	None	
Irene	January 6–13	150 (90)	970	Australia	Unknown	None	
TD (Atring)	January 10–13	55 (35)	1004	Philippines	Unknown	None	
Marion	January 11–21	110 (70)	980	Solomon Islands, Vanuatu, New Caledonia	Unknown	None	
June	January 16–26	120 (75)	965	Vanuatu, New Caledonia	Unknown	None	
Domitile	January 18–23	65 (40)	992	Juan de Nova Island, Madagascar	Unknown	None	
Emilie	January 28–February 5	100 (65)	980	Agaléga, Réunion, Madagascar, Mozambique, Northeastern South Africa	Unknown	≥300	
Fifi	January 29–February 10	120 (75)	985	Réunion	Unknown	1	
Keith	January 29–February 1	85 (50)	992	Australia	Unknown	None	

=== February ===
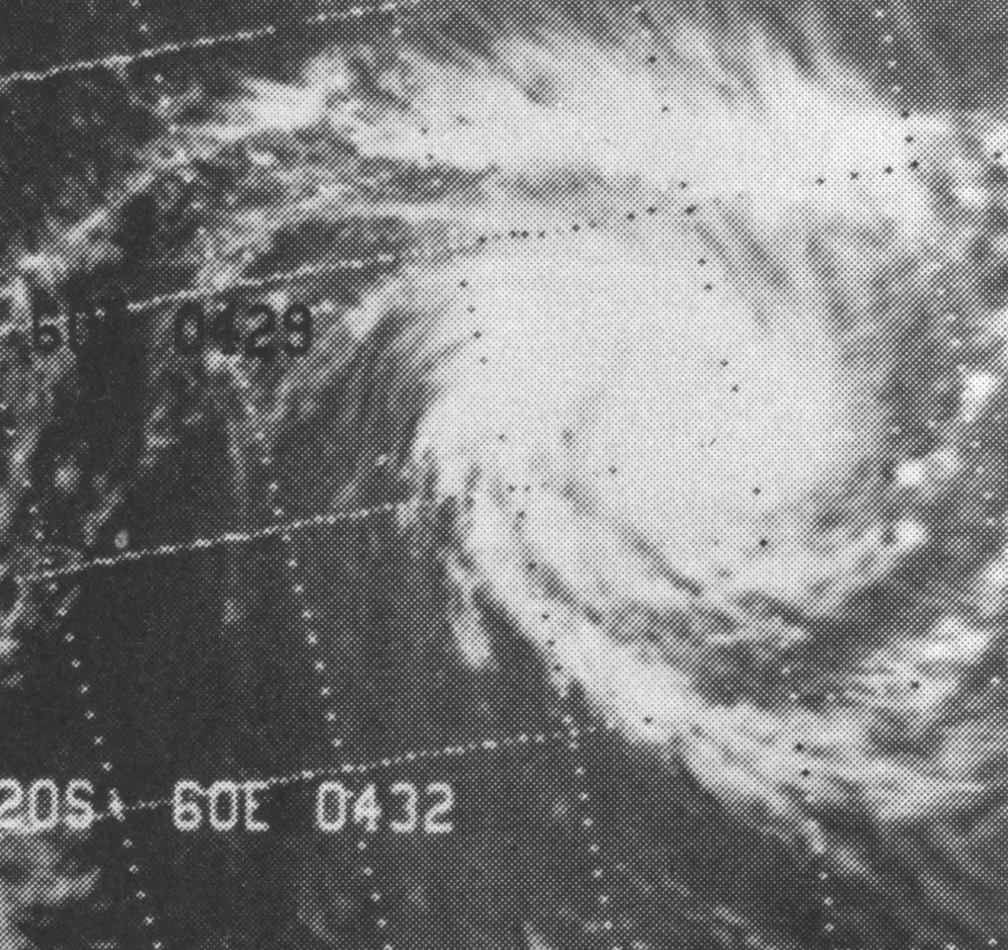
Cyclone Jack-Io

Tropical cyclones formed in February 1977
Storm name	Dates active	Max wind km/h (mph)	Pressure (hPa)	Areas affected	Damage (USD)	Deaths	Refs
07F	February 3–9	75 (45)	990	Fiji, Tonga	Unknown	None	
Gilda	February 4–9	55 (35)	1000	None	None	None	
Lily	February 8–12	65 (40)	996	Australia	Unknown	None	
Miles	February 9–13	75 (45)	994	None	None	None	
Hervea	February 10–March 3	110 (70)	970	Agaléga, Madagascar	Unknown	None	
Nancy	February 12–13	75 (45)	998	Australia	Unknown	None	
Jack-Io	February 13–March 2	165 (105)	≤935	Cocos (Keeling) Islands, Rodrigues	Unknown	None	
11F	February 20–24	75 (45)	990	Cook Islands	Unknown	None	
Karen	March 2–9	150 (90)	970	Australia	Unknown	None	

=== March ===
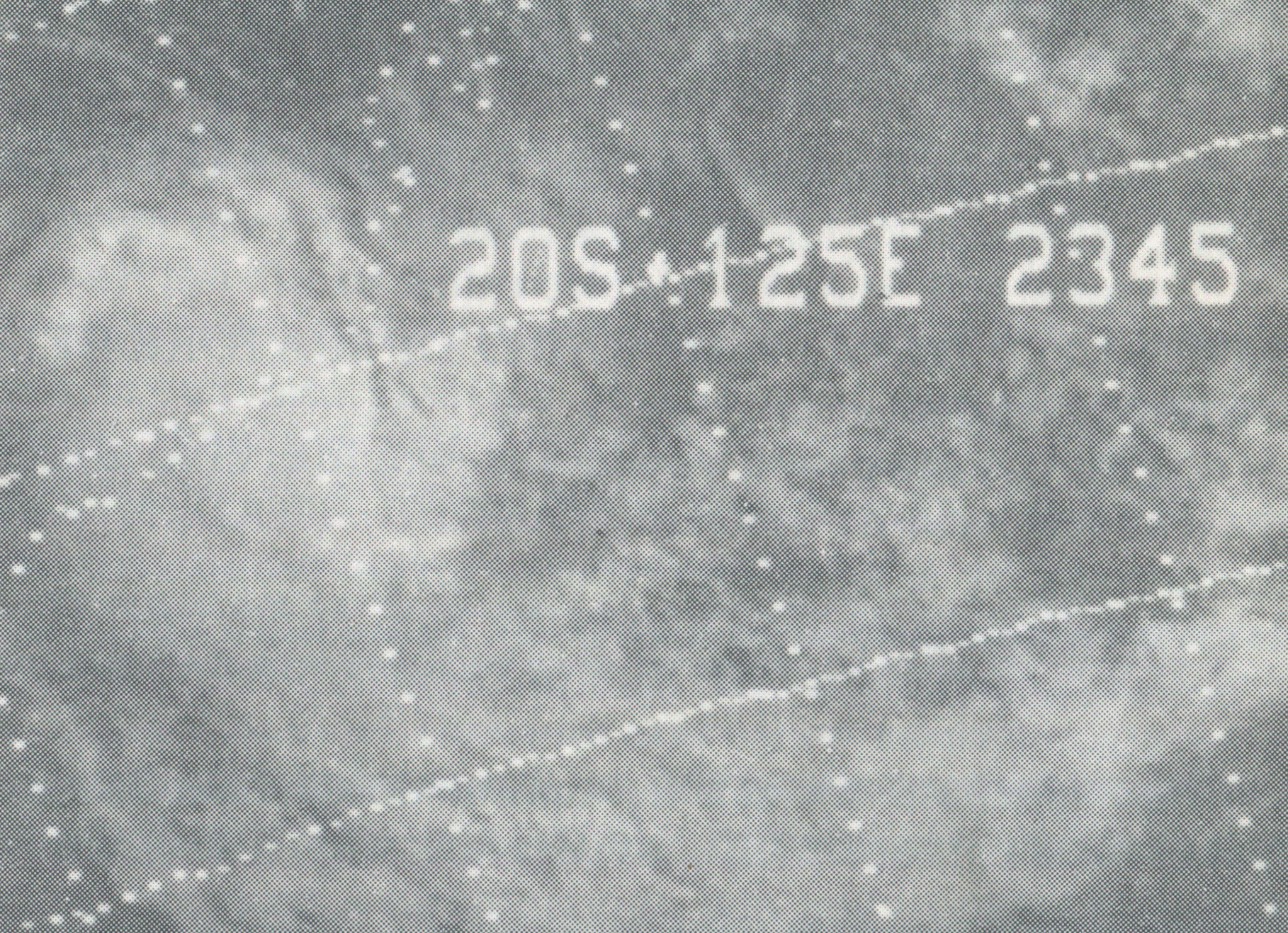
Cyclone Leo

Tropical cyclones formed in March 1977
Storm name	Dates active	Max wind km/h (mph)	Pressure (hPa)	Areas affected	Damage (USD)	Deaths	Refs
Otto	March 6–10	85 (50)	984	Australia	Unknown	None	
Norman	March 9–24	100 (65)	980	Solomon Islands, Vanuatu, New Caledonia	Unknown	None	
Pat	March 17–18	100 (65)	980	Tonga	Unknown	None	
Leo	March 24–28	165 (105)	955	Australia	Unknown	None	
Patsy	March 23–31	95 (60)	990	Marshall Islands	None	None	

=== April ===
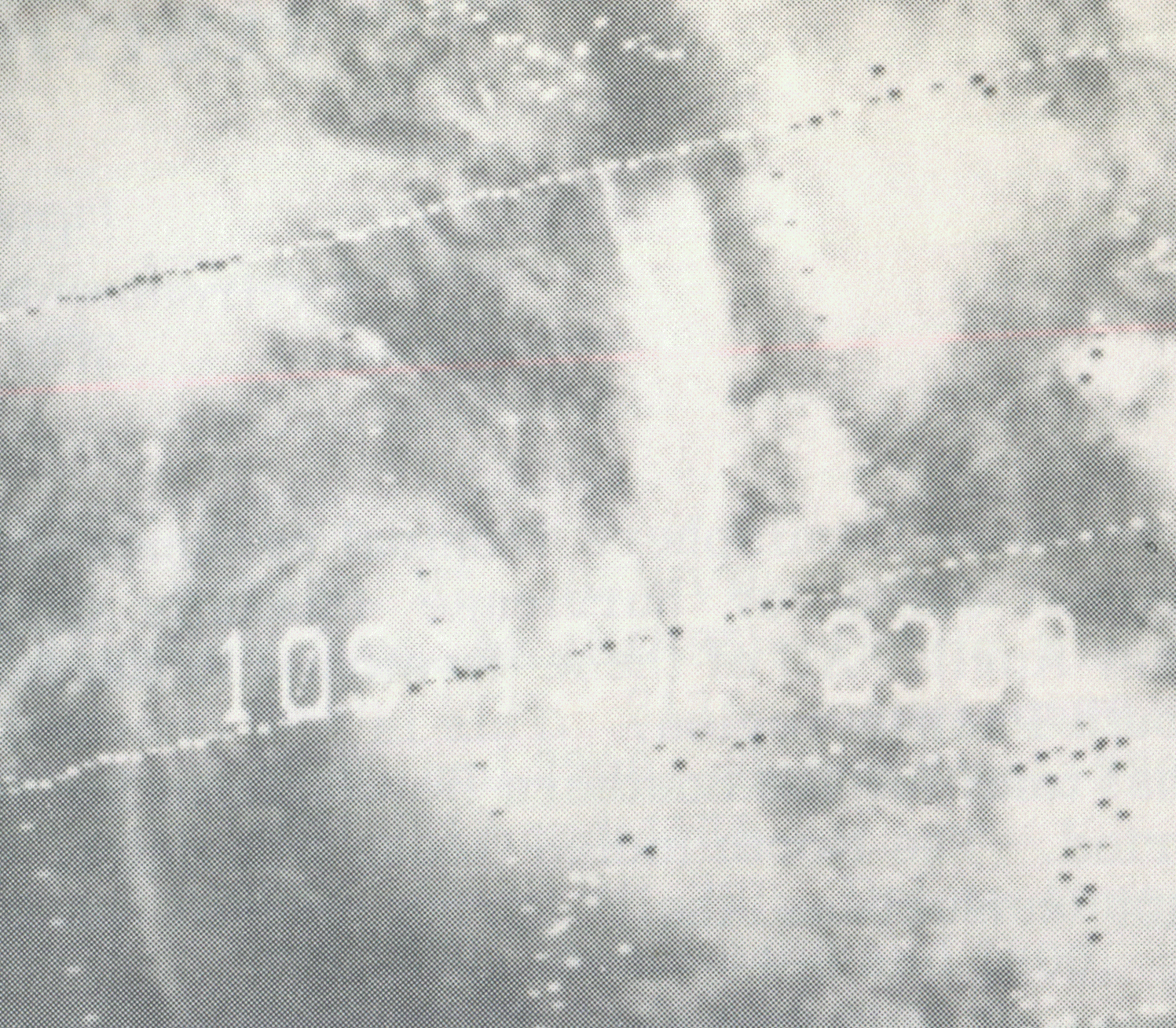
Cyclone Verna

Tropical cyclones formed in April 1977
Storm name	Dates active	Max wind km/h (mph)	Pressure (hPa)	Areas affected	Damage (USD)	Deaths	Refs
Robert	April 16–23	130 (80)	965	French Polynesia	Unknown	None	
Verna	April 28–May 3	130 (80)	973	Australia	Unknown	None	

=== May ===
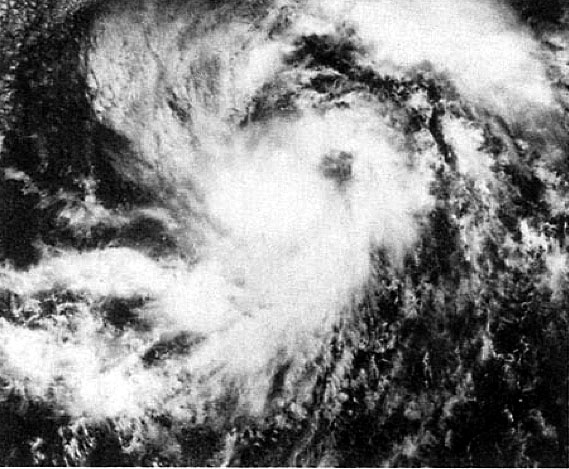
Tropical Storm Ava

Tropical cyclones formed in May 1977
Storm name	Dates active	Max wind km/h (mph)	Pressure (hPa)	Areas affected	Damage (USD)	Deaths	Refs
01B	May 9–13	100 (65)	Not specified	India, Bangladesh	Unknown	None	
02W (Bining)	May 26–27	55 (35)	1000	Japan	Minimal	None	
Ava	May 26–30	65 (100)	≤997	None	None	None	
Two	May 25–30	Unknown	Unknown	None	None	None	
TD (West Pacific)	May 28–30	Not specified	1006	Mariana Islands	None	None	
Three	May 30–June 1	Unknown	Unknown	None	None	None	

=== June ===
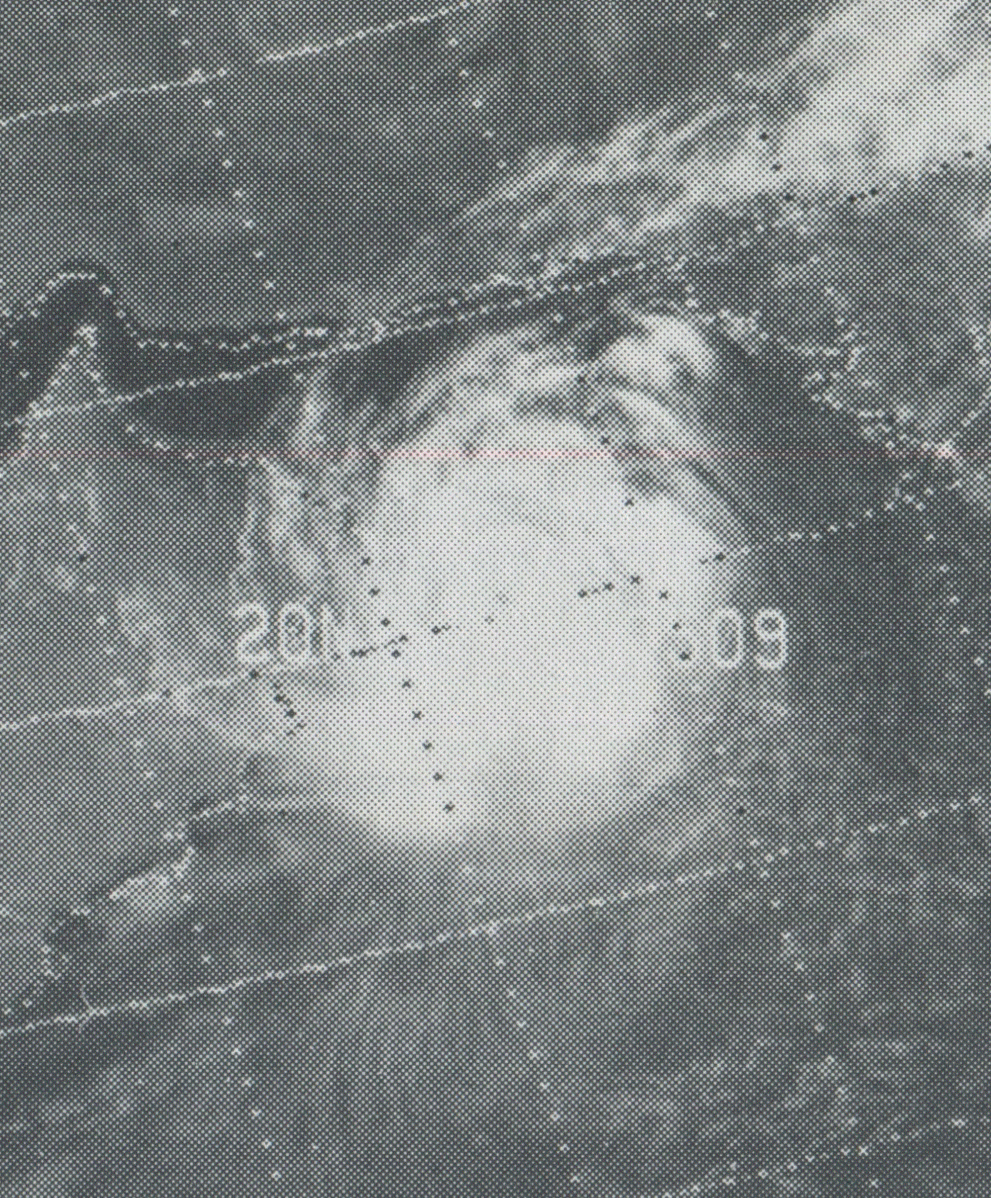
Tropical Storm 02A

Tropical cyclones formed in June 1977
Storm name	Dates active	Max wind km/h (mph)	Pressure (hPa)	Areas affected	Damage (USD)	Deaths	Refs
02A	June 9–13	165 (105)	959	Oman	Unknown	105	
TD	June 12	Not specified	1008	Philippines	None	None	
Unnumbered	June 13–14	45 (30)	Unknown	Texas	None	None	
Ruth (Kuring)	June 14–17	110 (70)	975	Philippines, China, Taiwan	Unknown	Unknown	
Bernice	June 25–28	65 (40)	Unknown	None	None	None	
TD	June 26–27	Not specified	1007	None	None	None	

=== July ===
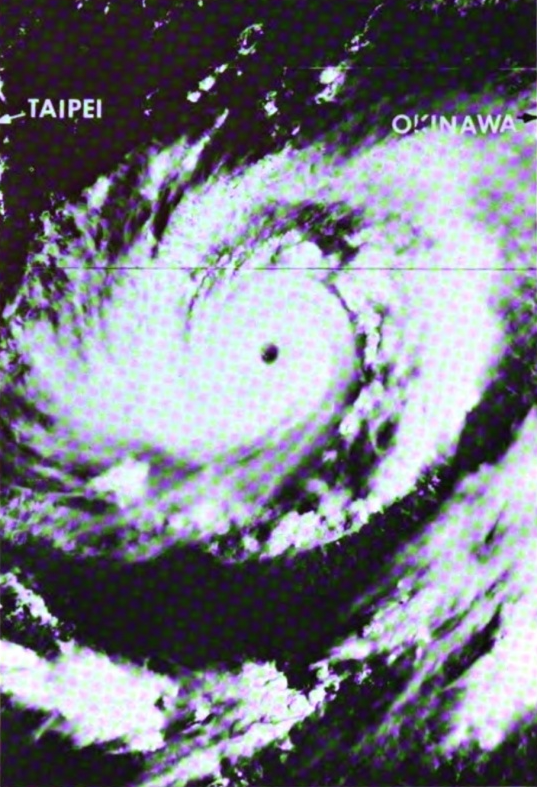
Typhoon Vera (Huling)

Tropical cyclones formed in July 1977
Storm name	Dates active	Max wind km/h (mph)	Pressure (hPa)	Areas affected	Damage (USD)	Deaths	Refs
Claudia	July 3–7	150 (90)	Unknown	None	None	None	
04W (Daling)	July 3–6	55 (35)	994	South China	None	None	
TD	July 4	Not specified	1008	Philippines	None	None	
Six	July 8–9	Unknown	Unknown	None	None	None	
Seven	July 9–10	Unknown	Unknown	None	None	None	
Sarah (Elang)	July 14–22	130 (80)	970	Palau, Philippines, South China, Vietnam	Unknown	Unknown	
TD	July 14–15	Not specified	1006	Philippines	None	None	
TD	July 14–18	Not specified	1006	Philippines	None	None	
Unnumbered	July 18–19	55 (35)	Unknown	Alabama	None	None	
Thelma (Goring)	July 19–27	130 (80)	950	Philippines, Taiwan, China	$629 Million	33	
Unnumbered	July 25–26	45 (30)	Unknown	None	None	None	
Eight	July 25	Unknown	Unknown	None	None	None	
Vera (Huling)	July 25–August 2	205 (125)	925	Ryukyu Islands, Taiwan, China	Unknown	25	
Wanda	July 30–August 7	75 (45)	985	None	None	None	
TD	July 30	Not specified	1002	None	None	None	
Nine	August 1–2	Unknown	Unknown	None	None	None	

=== August ===
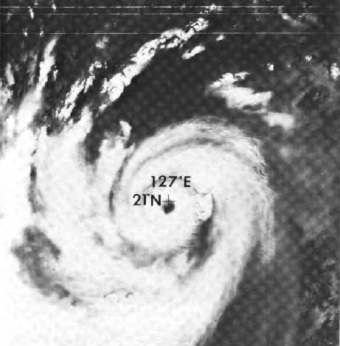
Typhoon Babe (Miling)

Tropical cyclones formed in August 1977
Storm name	Dates active	Max wind km/h (mph)	Pressure (hPa)	Areas affected	Damage (USD)	Deaths	Refs
Unnumbered	August 1–4	55 (35)	Unknown	None	None	None	
TD	August 10	Not specified	996	None	None	None	
TD	August 12	Not specified	998	Mariana Islands	None	None	
Doreen	August 13–18	120 (75)	979	Mexico, California	Unknown	Unknown	
TD	August 13–18	Not specified	996	Japan	None	None	
TD	August 14–18	Not specified	994	None	None	None	
TD	August 14–15	Not specified	1004	None	None	None	
Amy (Ibiang)	August 16–25	110 (70)	980	Philippines, Taiwan, Ryukyu Islands, Japan	Unknown	Unknown	
TD	August 17–20	Not specified	1004	None	None	None	
TD	August 20–21	Not specified	996	Ryukyu Islands	None	None	
08W	August 21–22	75 (45)	988	Japan	None	None	
TD	August 21	Not specified	996	Japan	None	None	
TD	August 27–28	Not specified	1000	None	None	None	
Anita (Eleven)	August 29–September 4	280 (175)	926	Northeastern Mexico	Unknown	11	
Carla (Luming)	August 31–September 6	65 (40)	990	Philippines, Vietnam, Laos	Unknown	None	
Babe (Miling) (WPAC)	August 31–September 12	205 (125)	905	Caroline Islands, Ryukyu Islands, East China	$23 Million	23	

=== September ===
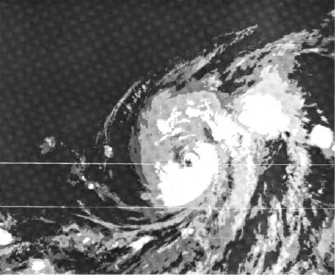
Typhoon Dinah (Openg)

Tropical cyclones formed in September 1977
Storm name	Dates active	Max wind km/h (mph)	Pressure (hPa)	Areas affected	Damage (USD)	Deaths	Refs
Babe (NATL)	September 3–9	120 (75)	995	Southern United States	$13 Million	None	
Thirteen	September 3–4	Unknown	Unknown	None	None	None	
Clara	September 5–11	120 (75)	993	The Carolinas, Nova Scotia	Minimal	None	
TD	September 7–9	Not specified	996	Japan	None	None	
TD	September 8	Not specified	1004	Vietnam	None	None	
TD	September 10	Not specified	1002	Caroline Islands	None	None	
Dinah (Openg)	September 11–26	130 (80)	965	Philippines, Vietnam, Laos, Cambodia	Unknown	54	
TD	September 11–12	Not specified	1004	None	None	None	
TD	September 11–12	Not specified	1002	Caroline Islands	None	None	
Emma	September 12–21	110 (70)	965	Mariana Islands, Japan	None	None	
Narsing	September 12–13	45 (30)	1002	Caroline Islands	None	None	
Emily	September 13–14	65 (40)	Unknown	None	None	None	
Unnumbered	September 17–19	45 (30)	Unknown	None	None	None	
Florence	September 20–24	165 (105)	Unknown	None	None	None	
Freda (Pining)	September 21–25	100 (60)	980	Philippines, South China	None	1	
Unnumbered	September 22–23	45 (30)	Unknown	Northern Mexico	None	None	
Glenda	September 24–27	65 (40)	Unknown	None	None	None	
Dorothy	September 26–29	140 (85)	980	Bermuda, Newfoundland	None	None	
TD	September 26–29	Not specified	1008	Ryukyu Islands	None	None	
TD	September 29	Not specified	1008	None	None	None	

=== October ===
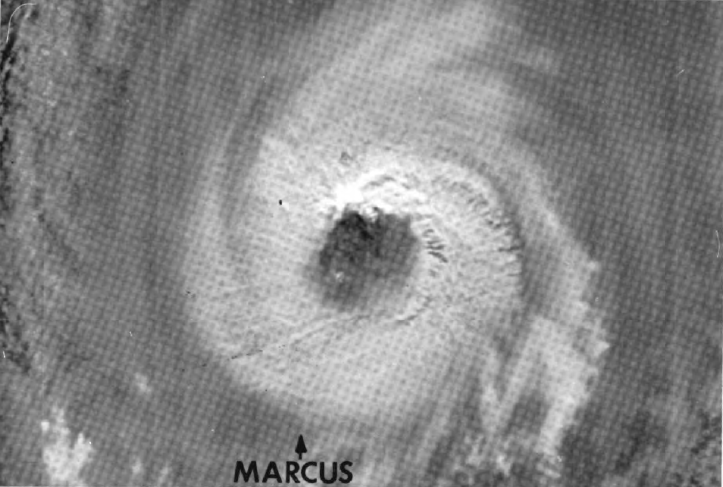
Typhoon Ivy

Tropical cyclones formed in October 1977
Storm name	Dates active	Max wind km/h (mph)	Pressure (hPa)	Areas affected	Damage (USD)	Deaths	Refs
Unnumbered	October 1–3	55 (35)	Unknown	Windward Islands	None	None	
Unnumbered	October 3–5	55 (35)	Unknown	None	None	None	
Gilda	October 3–9	120 (75)	965	None	None	None	
Heather	October 4–7	140 (85)	978	Northwest Mexico Southwest United States	$15 Million	None	
TD	October 8	Not specified	1008	None	None	None	
Fifteen	October 11–13	75 (45)	990	Japan	None	None	
Rubing	October 11–15	55 (35)	1004	Mariana Islands	None	None	
Evelyn	October 13–15	130 (80)	994	Bermuda, Nova Scotia, Newfoundland	None	None	
Harriet (Saling)	October 14–20	100 (60)	980	None	None	None	
Frieda	October 16–19	95 (60)	1005	Cayman Islands, Belize	None	None	
Ivy	October 18–27	150 (95)	950	Mariana Islands	None	None	
03A	October 19–22	55 (35)	Unknown	Yemen, Somalia	None	None	
Seventeen	October 22–23	Unknown	Unknown	None	None	None	
Unnumbered	October 24–25	55 (35)	Unknown	Louisiana	None	None	
04B	October 27–November 4	85 (50)	Unknown	Andaman and Nicobar Islands, South India	Unknown	None	
Jean	October 28–November 5	120 (75)	970	None	None	None	
TD	October 30–31	Not specified	1008	None	None	None	

=== November ===
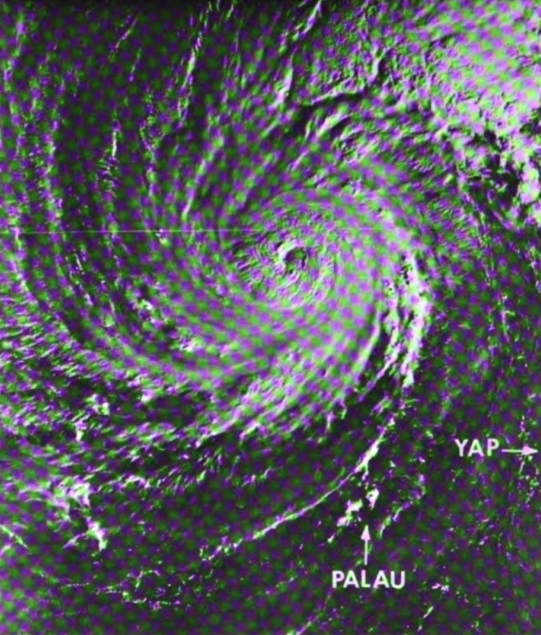
Typhoon Lucy (Walding)

Tropical cyclones formed in November 1977
Storm name	Dates active	Max wind km/h (mph)	Pressure (hPa)	Areas affected	Damage (USD)	Deaths	Refs
Tasing	November 3–5	45 (30)	1008	None	Unknown	Unknown	
Nine	November 3–7	55 (35)	1006	Eastern United States	$203 Million	53	
Kim (Unding)	November 4–17	120 (75)	920	Mariana Islands, Philippines	$2.04 Million	102	
Tom	November 6–11	95 (60)	990	Papua New Guinea, Solomon Islands	Unknown	None	
058	November 8–23	165 (105)	Unknown	South India	Unknown	Unknown	
068	November 14–20	230 (145)	943	South India	$196	10000	
TD	November 15–17	Not specified	1006	None	None	None	
Aurore	November 18–29	175 (110)	927	None	None	None	
TD	November 24	Not specified	1010	Philippines	None	None	
Steve	November 24–December 4	110 (70)	965	Tuvalu, Fiji	None	None	
Lucy (Walding)	November 28–December 9	205 (125)	920	Caroline Islands	None	None	

=== December ===
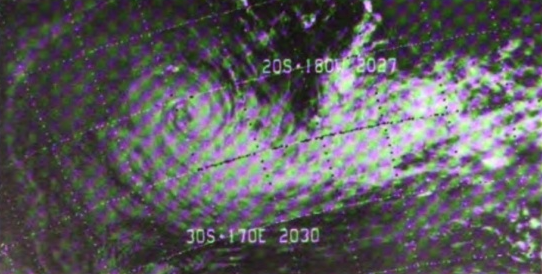
Cyclone Bob

Tropical cyclones formed in December 1977
Storm name	Dates active	Max wind km/h (mph)	Pressure (hPa)	Areas affected	Damage (USD)	Deaths	Refs
Babette	December 3–8	65 (40)	991	None	None	None	
Tessa	December 5–11	75 (45)	990	French Polynesia	Unknown	None	
Sam	December 13–14	95 (60)	1003	None	None	None	
Celimene	December 14–23	95 (60)	1003	None	None	None	
Mari (Yeyeng)	December 18, 1977–January, 1978	155 (95)	945	Marshall Islands, Caroline Islands, Philippines, Malaysia, Indonesia	Unknown	Unknown	
Anne	December 23–31	100 (65)	980	Wallis and Futuna, Fiji, Tonga	Unknown	Unknown	
Dulcinee	December 26–28	50 (30)	997	None	None	None	
Esther	December 28, 1977–January 2, 1978	80 (50)	984	None	None	None	
Bob	December 31, 1977–January 12, 1978	155 (100)	945	Tuvalu, Vanuatu, New Caledonia, Norfolk Island, North New Zealand	Unknown	Unknown	
