= 1977–78 South-West Indian Ocean cyclone season =

Cyclone season in the Southwest Indian Ocean

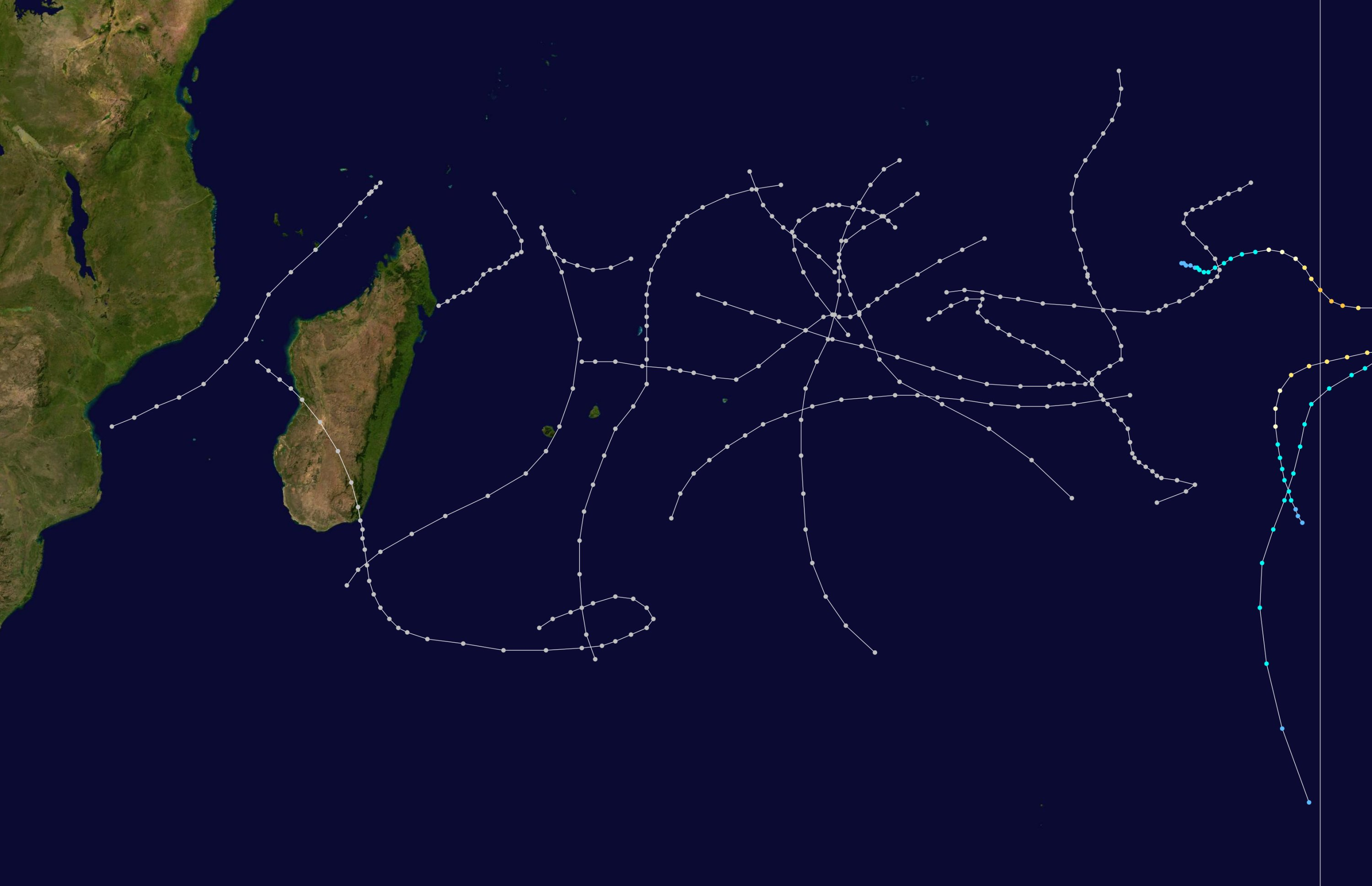
- Season summary map

Seasonal boundaries
- First system formed: November 18, 1977
- Last system dissipated: March 23, 1978

Strongest storm
- Name: Aurore
  - Maximum winds: 170 km/h (105 mph) (10-minute sustained)
  - Lowest pressure: 927 hPa (mbar)

Seasonal statistics
- Total depressions: 14
- Total storms: 12
- Tropical cyclones: 2
- Intense tropical cyclones: 1
- Total fatalities: 2
- Total damage: Unknown

Related articles
- 1977–78 Australian region cyclone season; 1977–78 South Pacific cyclone season

The 1977–78 South-West Indian Ocean cyclone season was an above average cyclone season. The season officially ran from November 1, 1977, to April 30, 1978.

== Systems ==
=== Intense Tropical Cyclone Aurore ===
- Intense tropical cyclone (MFR)
- Category 4 tropical cyclone (SSHWS)
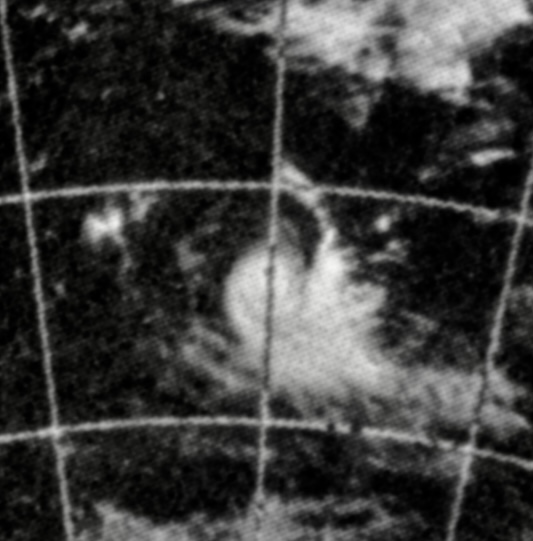
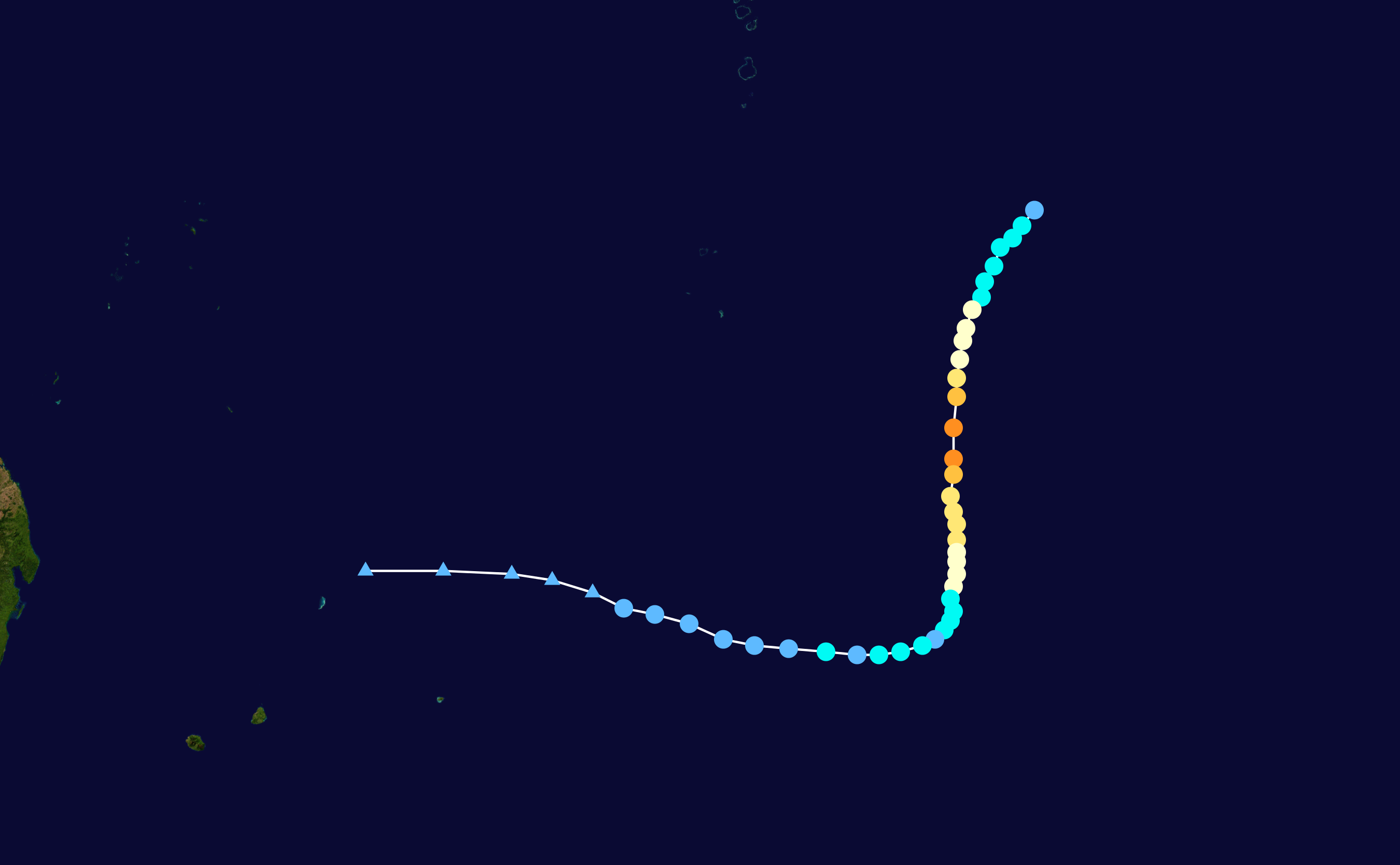
- Duration: November 18 – November 29
- Peak intensity: 175 km/h (110 mph) (10-min); 927 hPa (mbar)

=== Moderate Tropical Storm Babette ===
- Moderate tropical storm (MFR)
- Tropical storm (SSHWS)
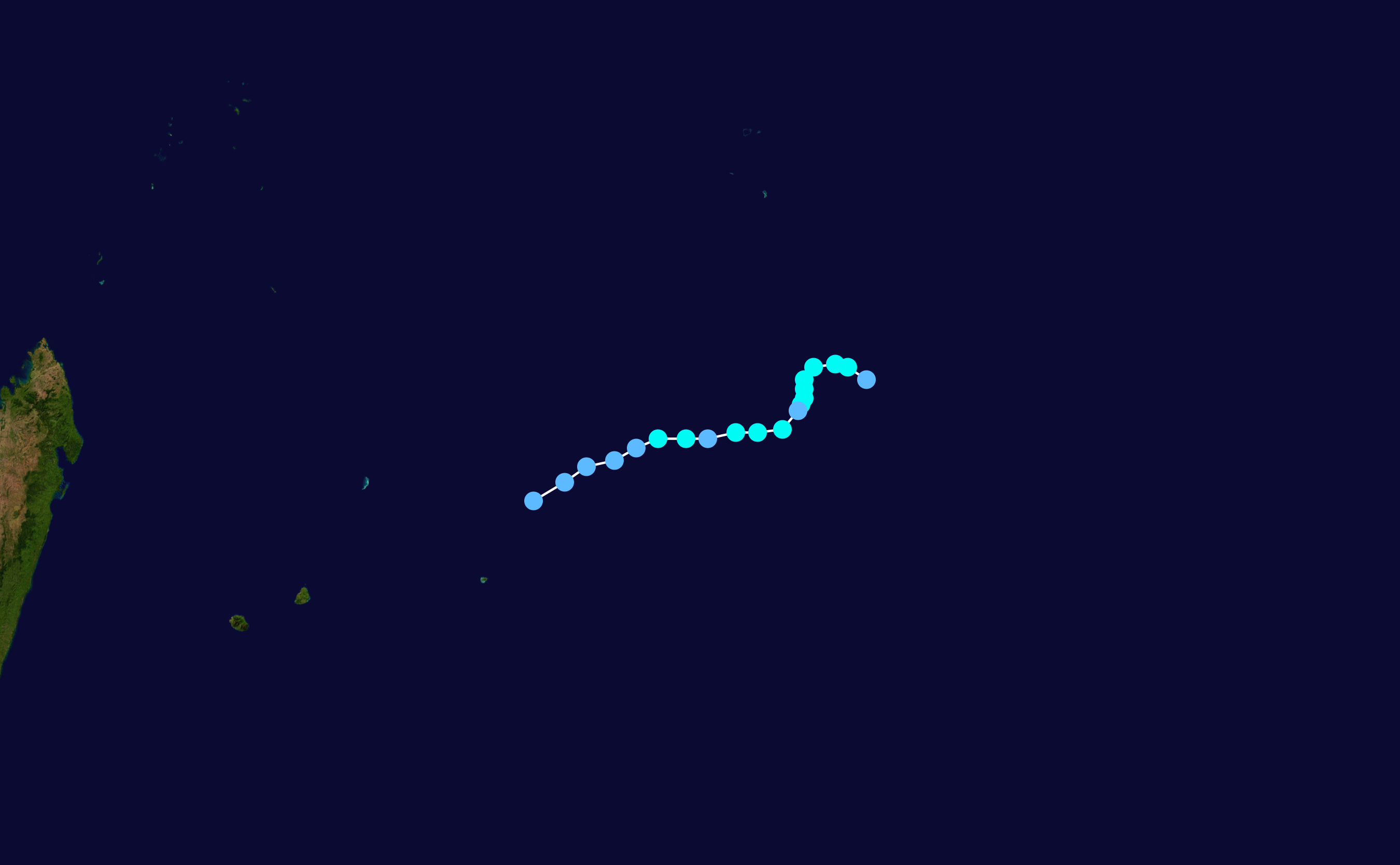
- Duration: December 3 – December 8
- Peak intensity: 65 km/h (40 mph) (10-min); 991 hPa (mbar)

=== Moderate Tropical Storm Sam–Celimene ===
- Moderate tropical storm (MFR)
- Tropical storm (SSHWS)
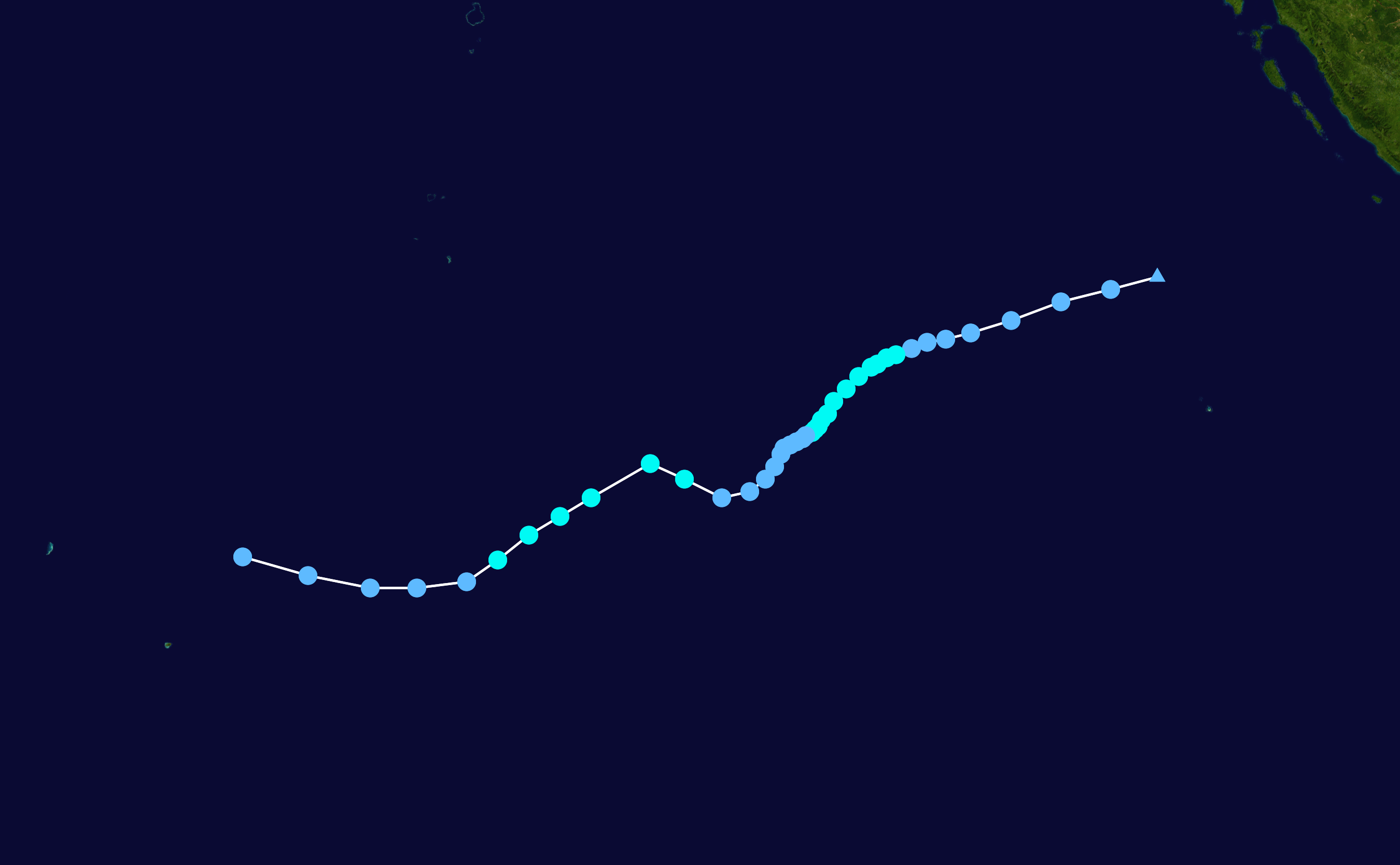
- Duration: December 21 (Entered basin) – December 23
- Peak intensity: 65 km/h (40 mph) (10-min); 991 hPa (mbar)

=== Tropical Depression Dulcinee ===
- Tropical depression (MFR)
- Tropical storm (SSHWS)
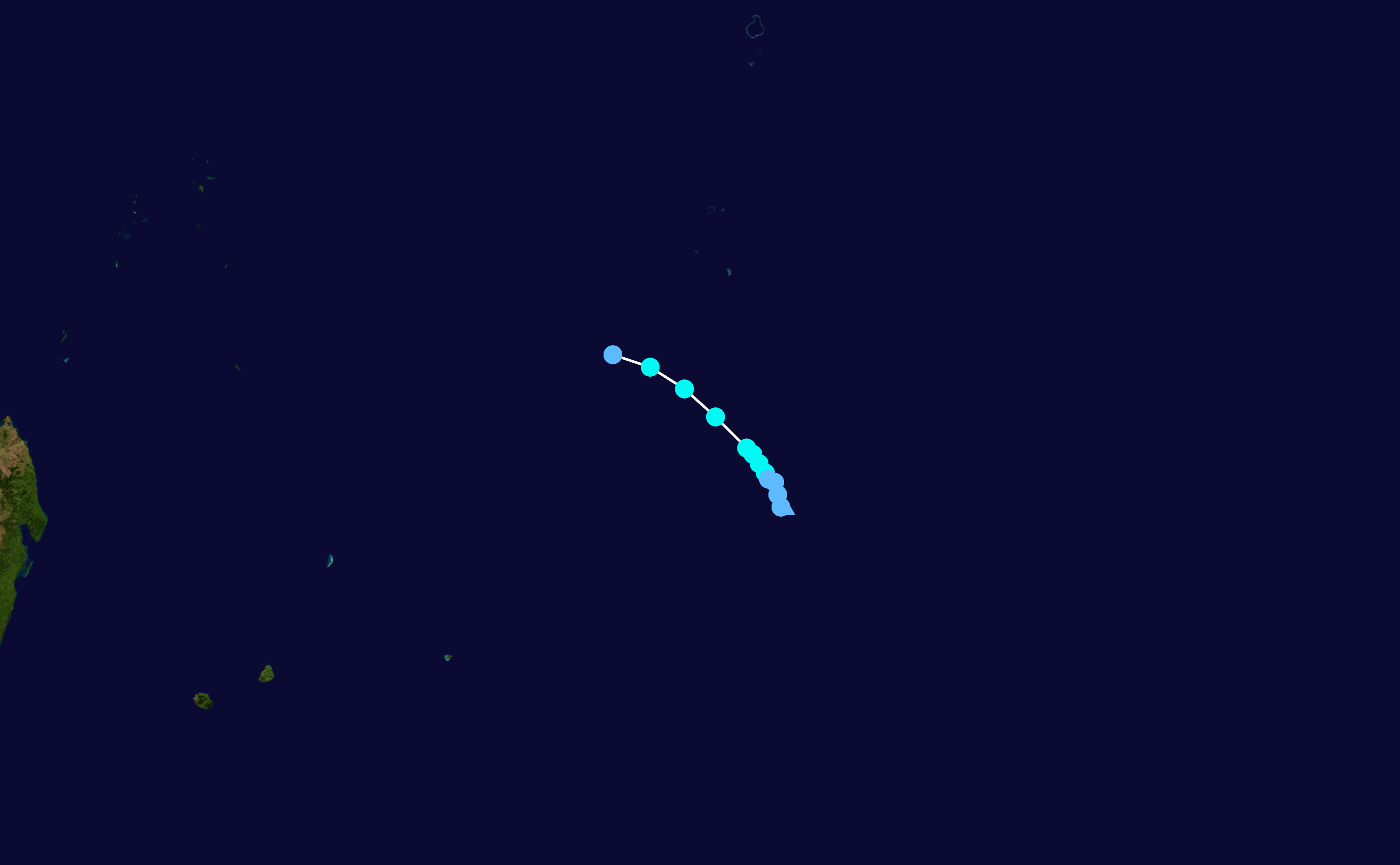
- Duration: December 26 – December 28
- Peak intensity: 50 km/h (30 mph) (10-min); 997 hPa (mbar)

=== Moderate Tropical Storm Esther ===
- Moderate tropical storm (MFR)
- Category 1 tropical cyclone (SSHWS)
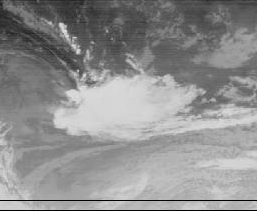
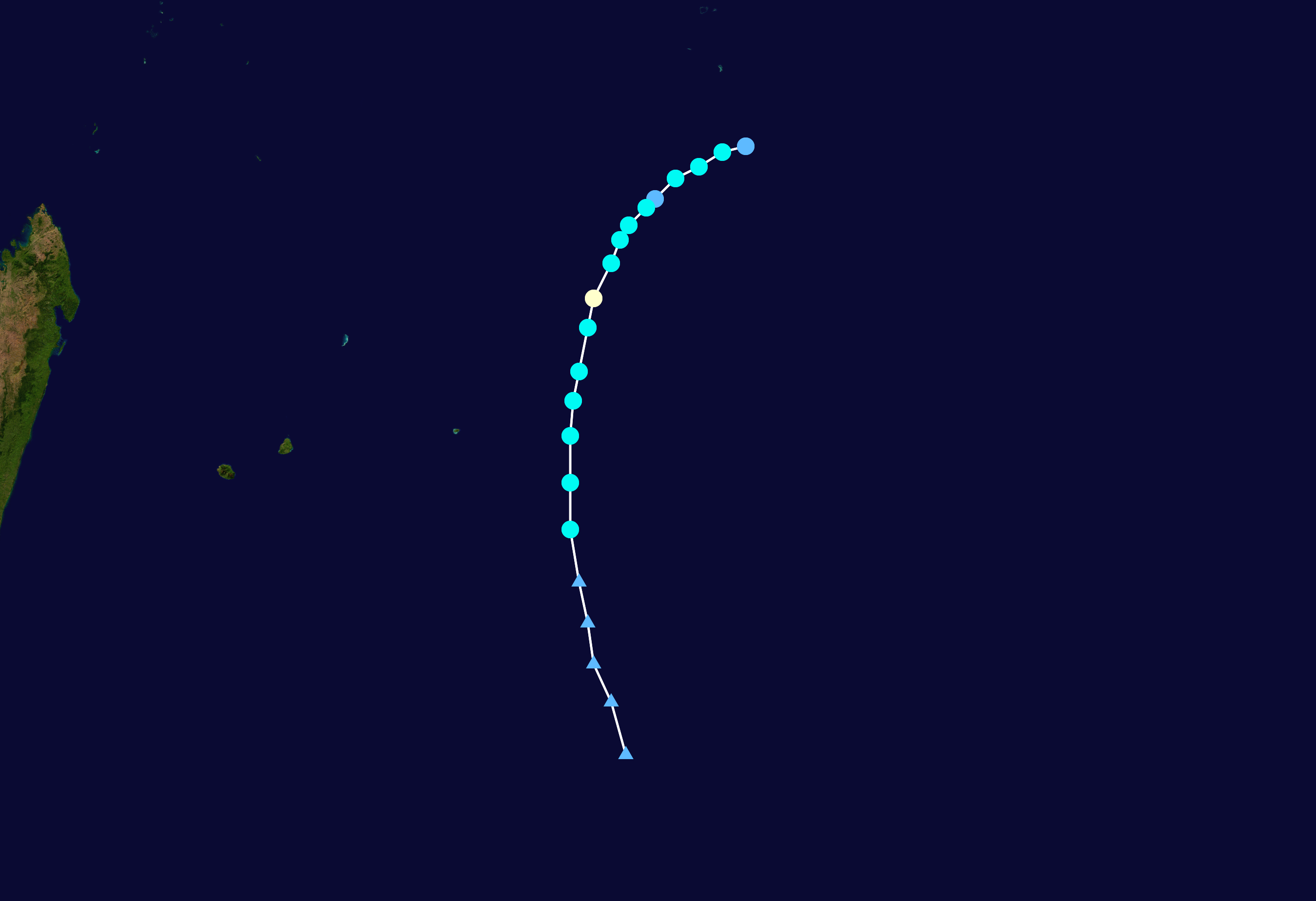
- Duration: December 28 – January 2
- Peak intensity: 80 km/h (50 mph) (10-min); 984 hPa (mbar)

=== Tropical Cyclone Fleur ===
- Tropical cyclone (MFR)
- Category 3 tropical cyclone (SSHWS)
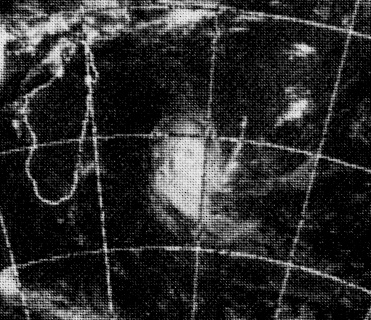
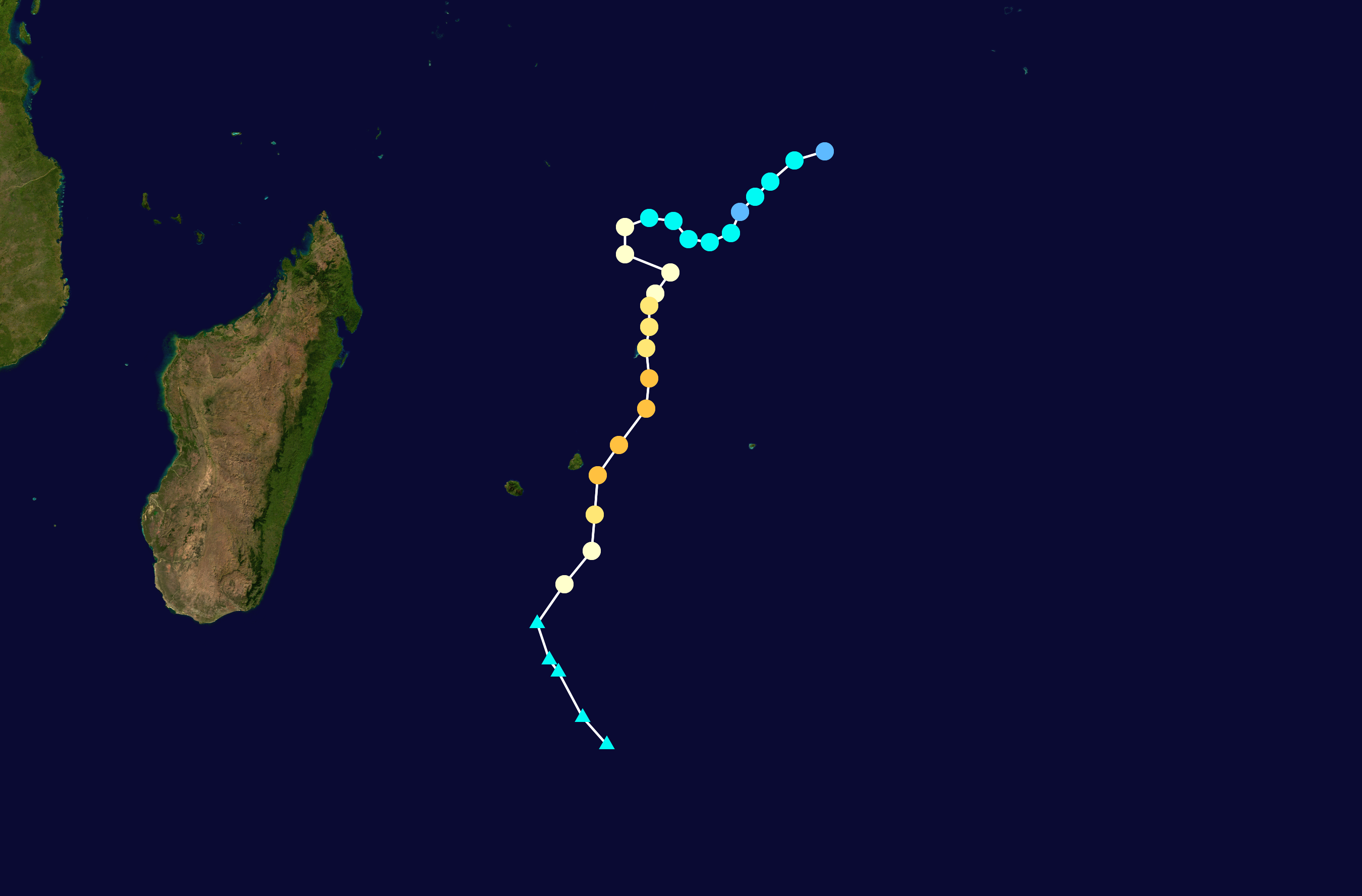
- Duration: January 16 – January 23
- Peak intensity: 150 km/h (95 mph) (10-min); 941 hPa (mbar)

Cyclone Fleur passed just east of Mauritius on January 20, producing wind gusts of 145 km/h (90 mph), which damaged crops. Heavy rainfall occurred on neighboring Réunion, reaching 442 mm (17.4 in) at Foc Foc.

=== Moderate Tropical Storm Huberte ===
- Moderate tropical storm (MFR)
- Tropical storm (SSHWS)
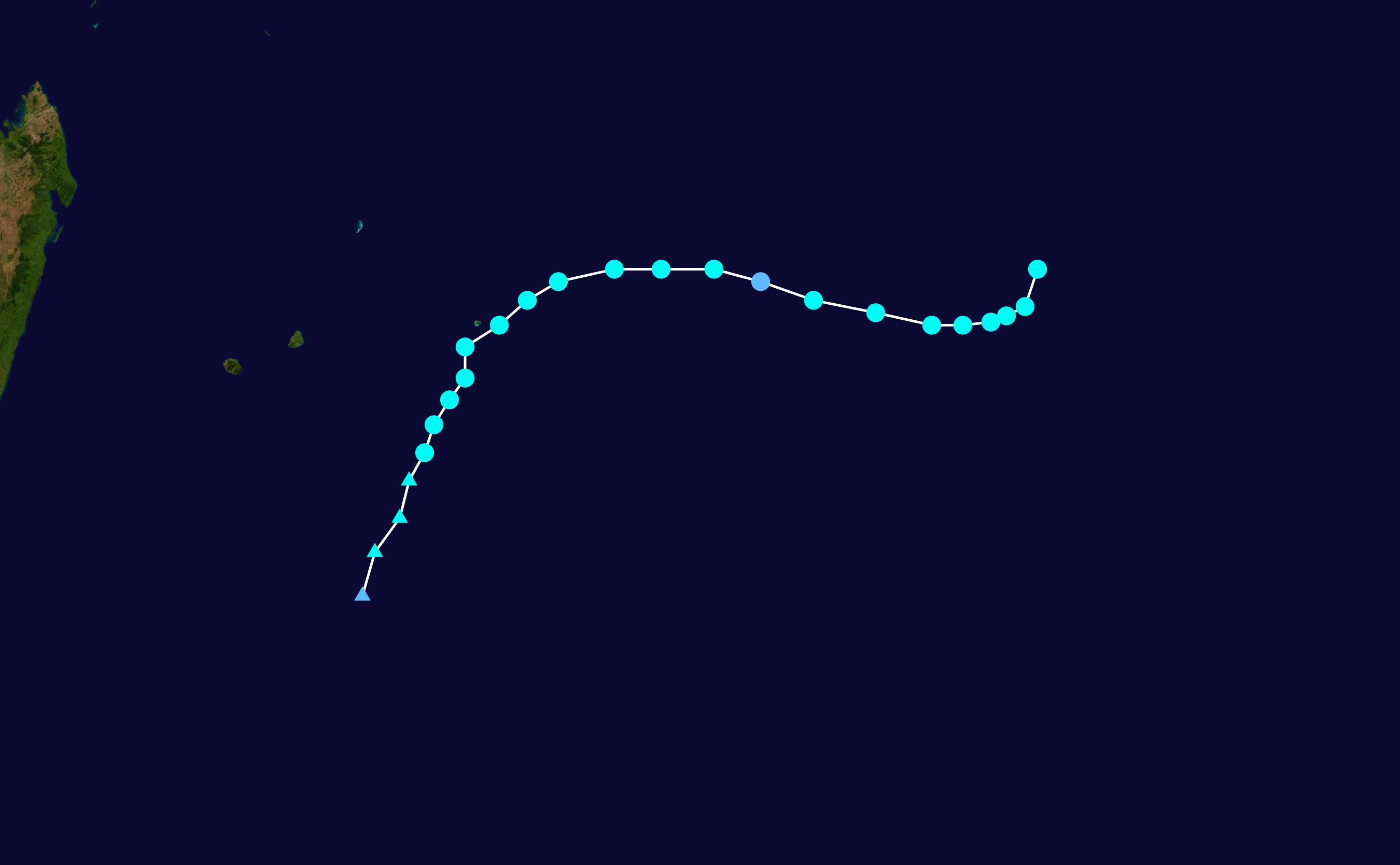
- Duration: January 26 – February 1
- Peak intensity: 65 km/h (40 mph) (10-min); 991 hPa (mbar)

The storm passed near Rodrigues.

=== Moderate Tropical Storm Georgia ===
- Moderate tropical storm (MFR)
- Tropical storm (SSHWS)
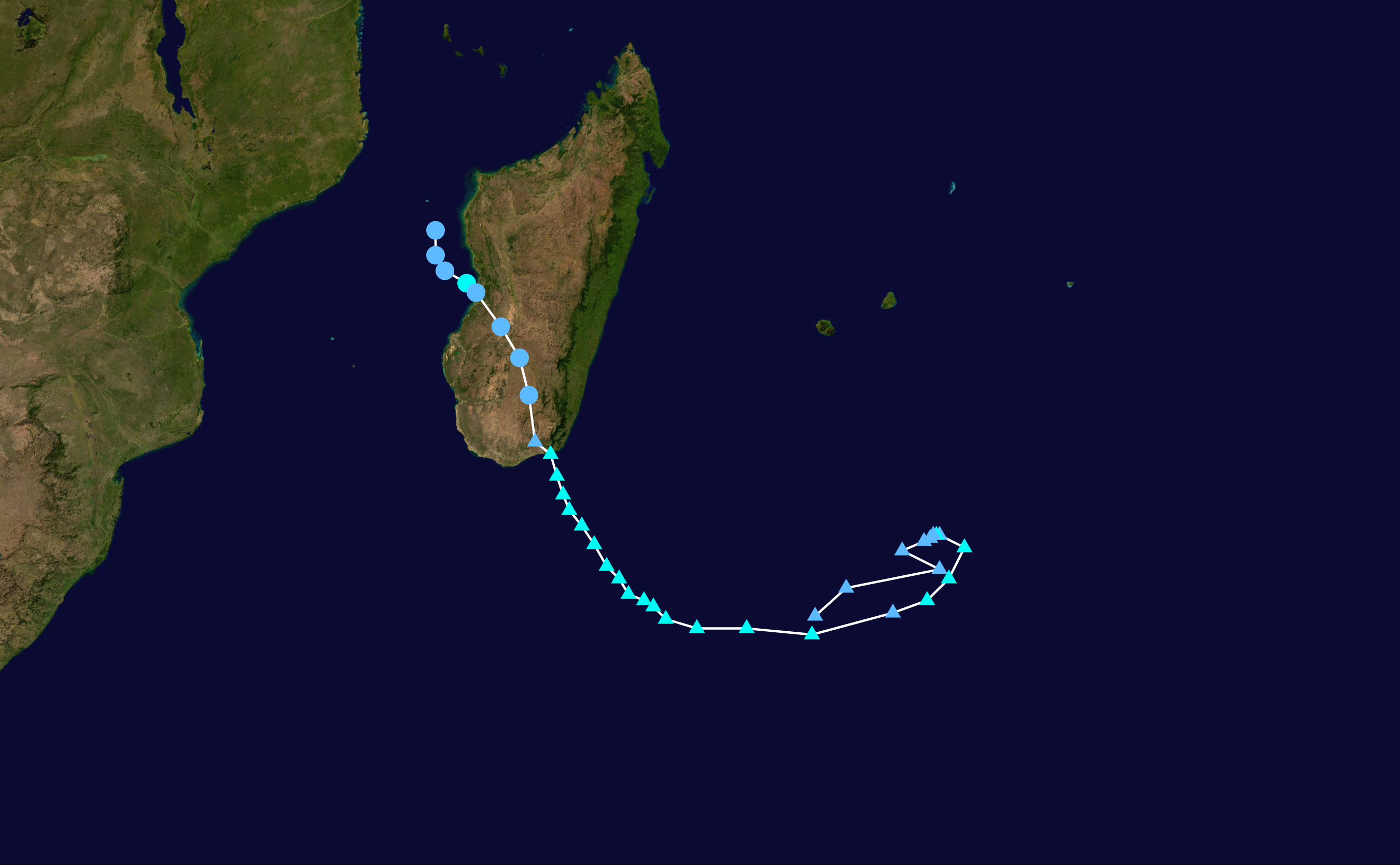
- Duration: January 27 – February 5
- Peak intensity: 65 km/h (40 mph) (10-min); 991 hPa (mbar)

=== Severe Tropical Storm Irena ===
- Severe tropical storm (MFR)
- Category 1 tropical cyclone (SSHWS)
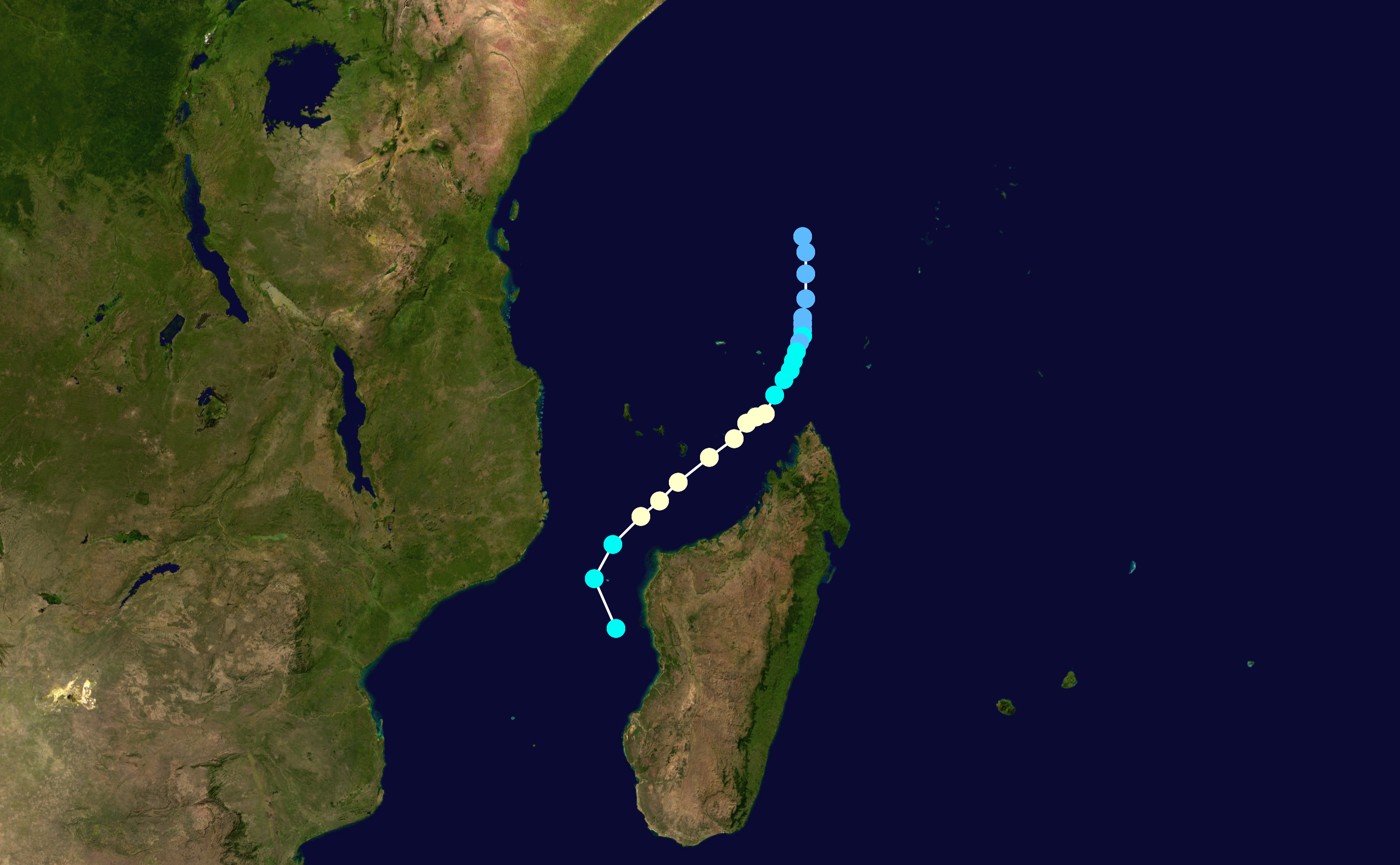
- Duration: February 7 – February 14
- Peak intensity: 95 km/h (60 mph) (10-min); 976 hPa (mbar)

=== Moderate Tropical Storm Jacqueline ===
- Moderate tropical storm (MFR)
- Tropical storm (SSHWS)
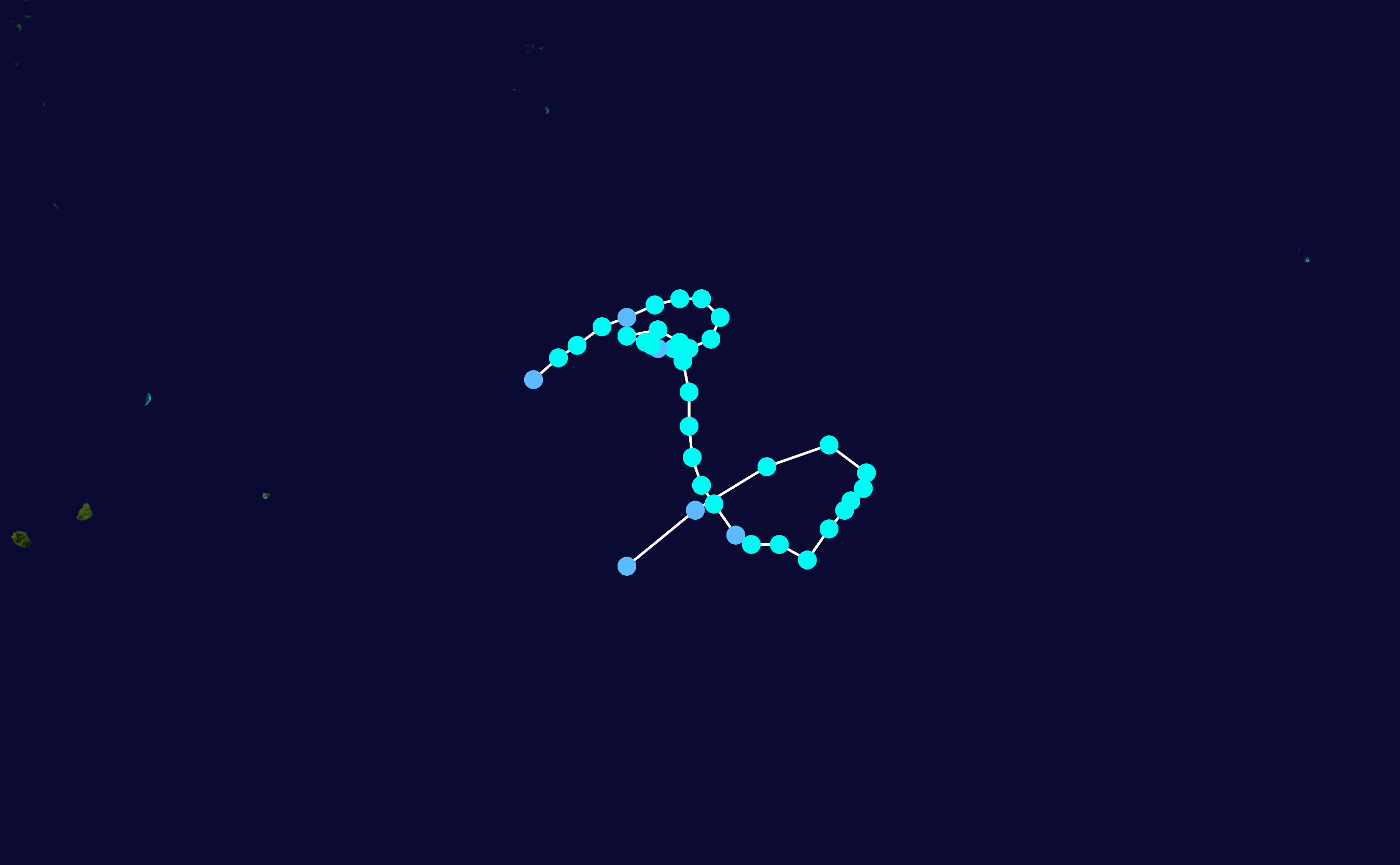
- Duration: February 12 – February 21
- Peak intensity: 65 km/h (40 mph) (10-min); 991 hPa (mbar)

=== Moderate Tropical Storm Kiki ===
- Moderate tropical storm (MFR)
- Tropical storm (SSHWS)
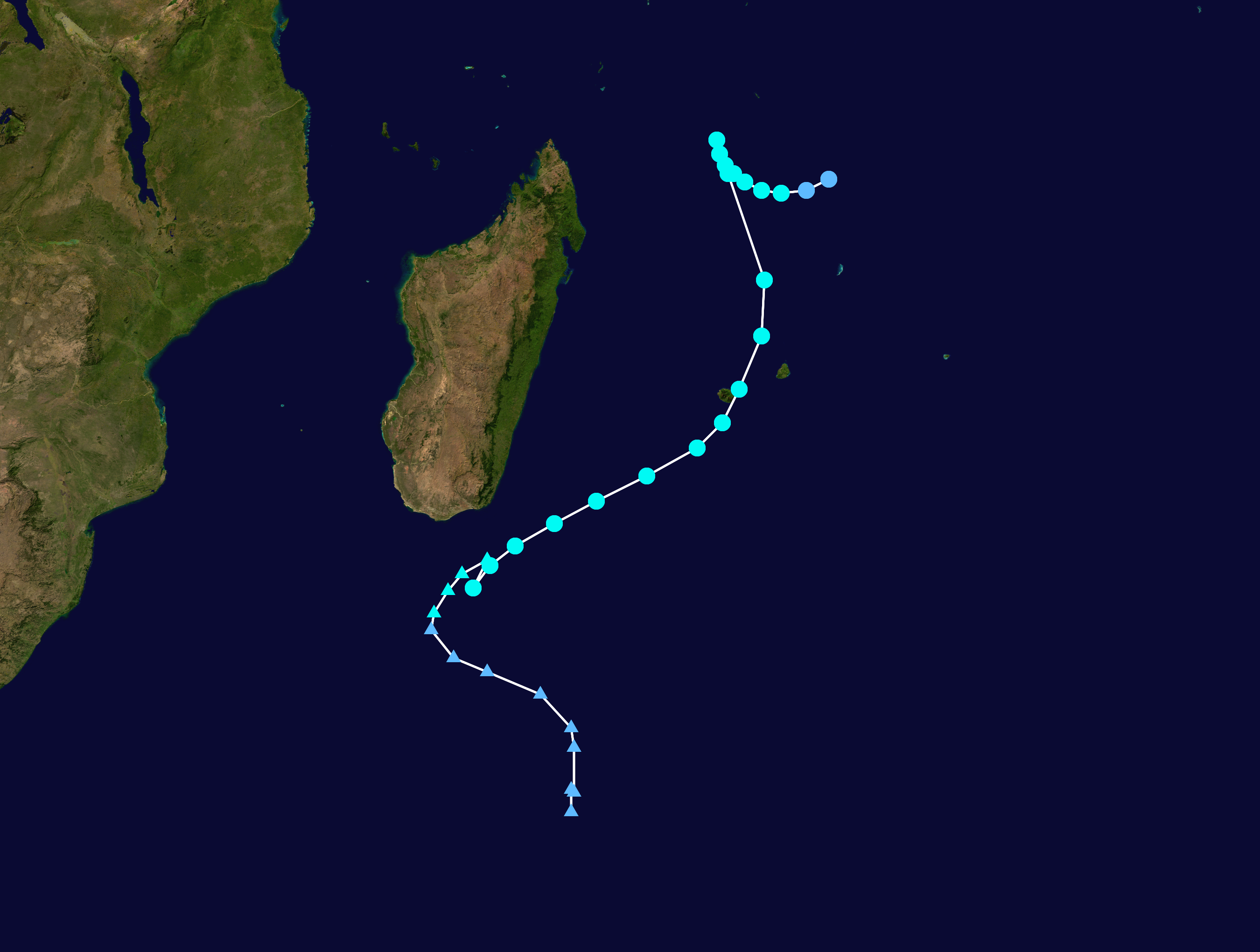
- Duration: March 4 – March 12
- Peak intensity: 65 km/h (40 mph) (10-min); 991 hPa (mbar)

On March 7, Kiki reformed near Mauritius and latter passed just southeast of Réunion. Rainfall reached 275.5 mm (10.85 in), which flooded coastal roads, damaged bridges, and killed two people.

=== Tropical Depression Lucie ===
- Tropical depression (MFR)
- Tropical storm (SSHWS)
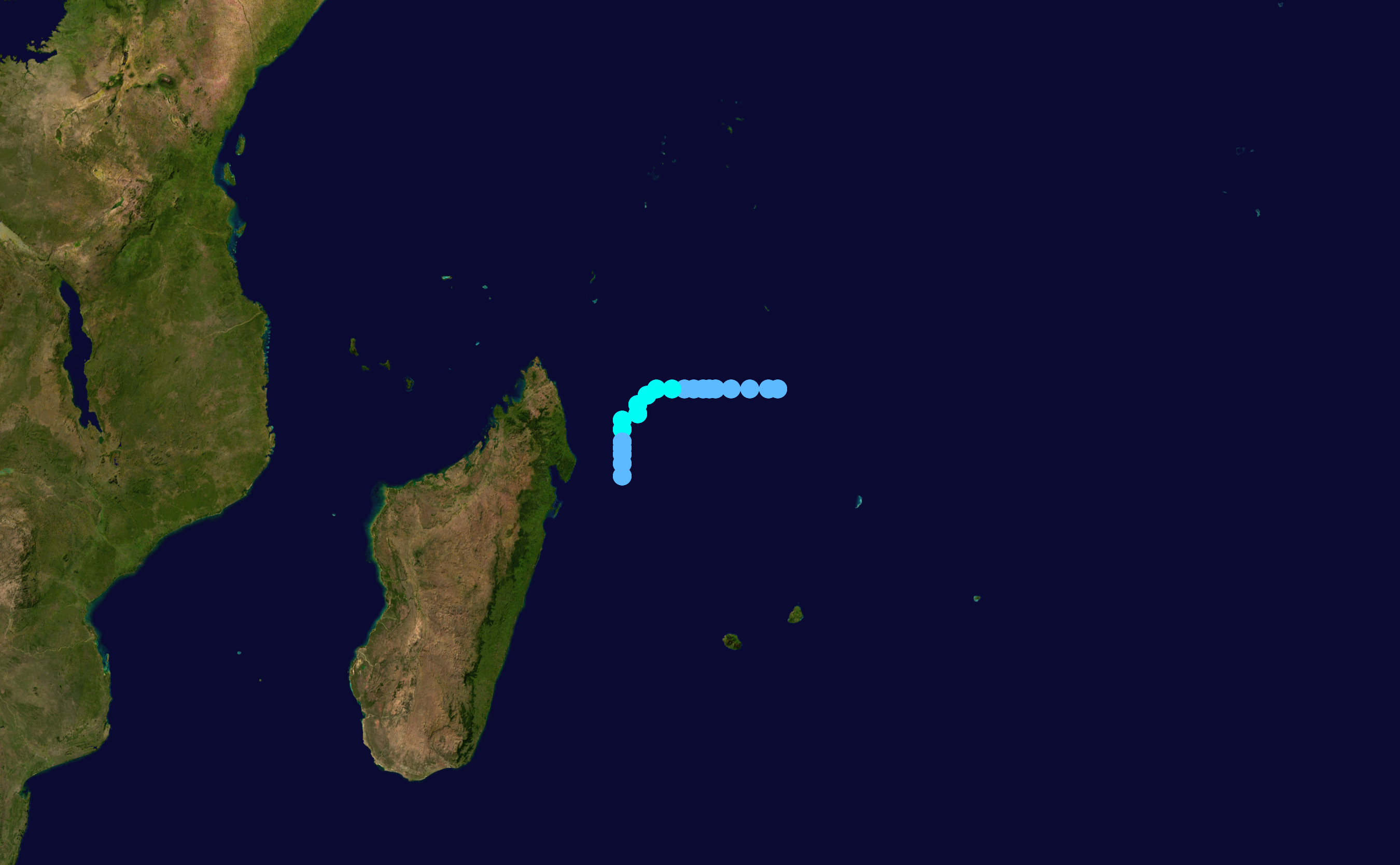
- Duration: March 14 – March 18
- Peak intensity: 50 km/h (30 mph) (10-min); 997 hPa (mbar)

=== Moderate Tropical Storm Marylou ===
- Moderate tropical storm (MFR)
- Tropical storm (SSHWS)
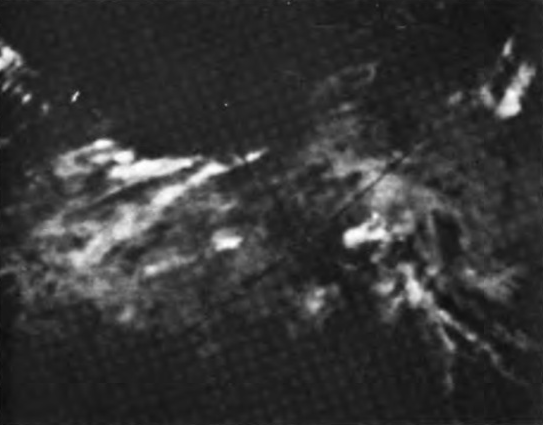
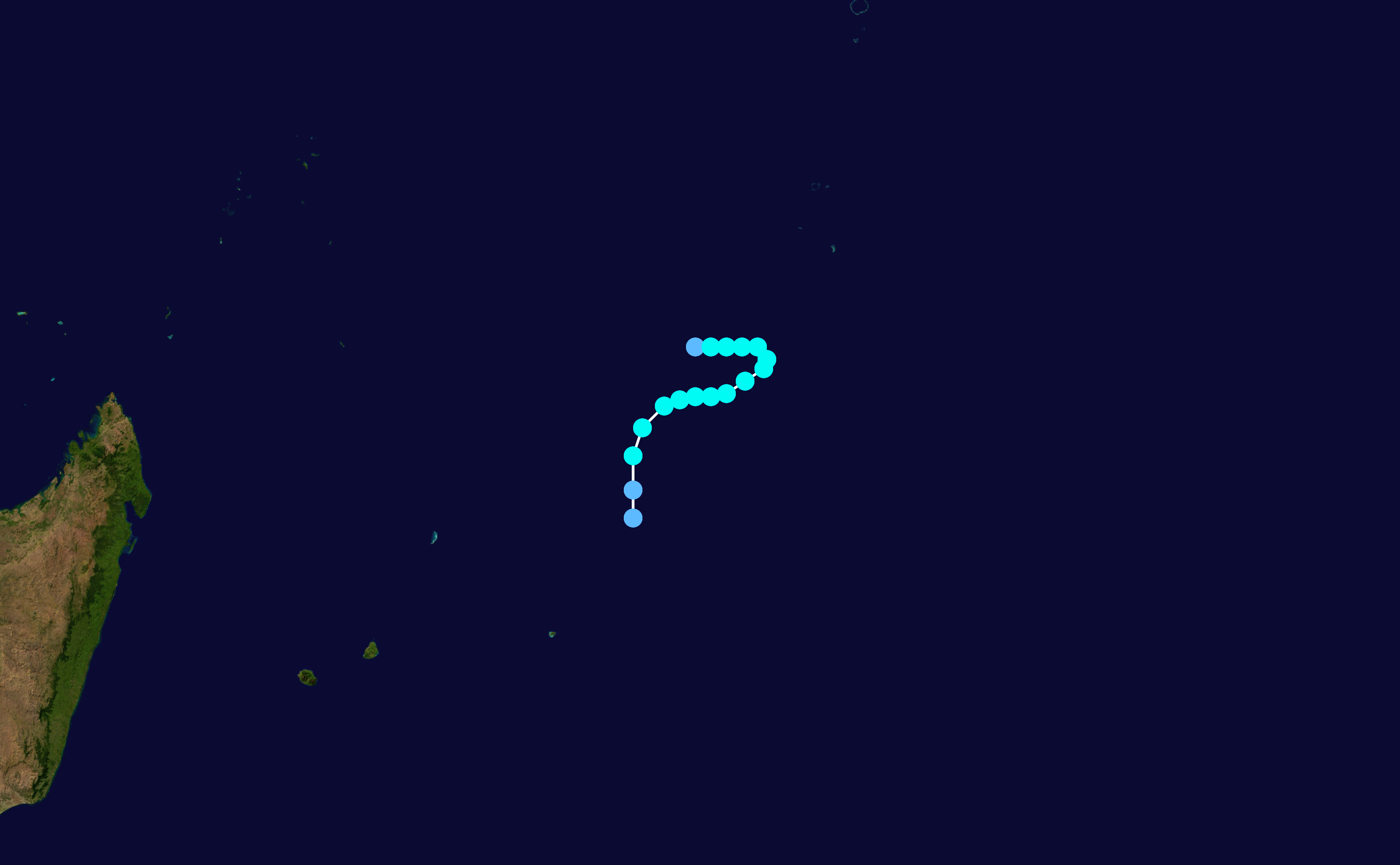
- Duration: March 15 – March 19
- Peak intensity: 65 km/h (40 mph) (10-min); 991 hPa (mbar)

=== Severe Tropical Storm Nadine ===
- Severe tropical storm (MFR)
- Category 1 tropical cyclone (SSHWS)
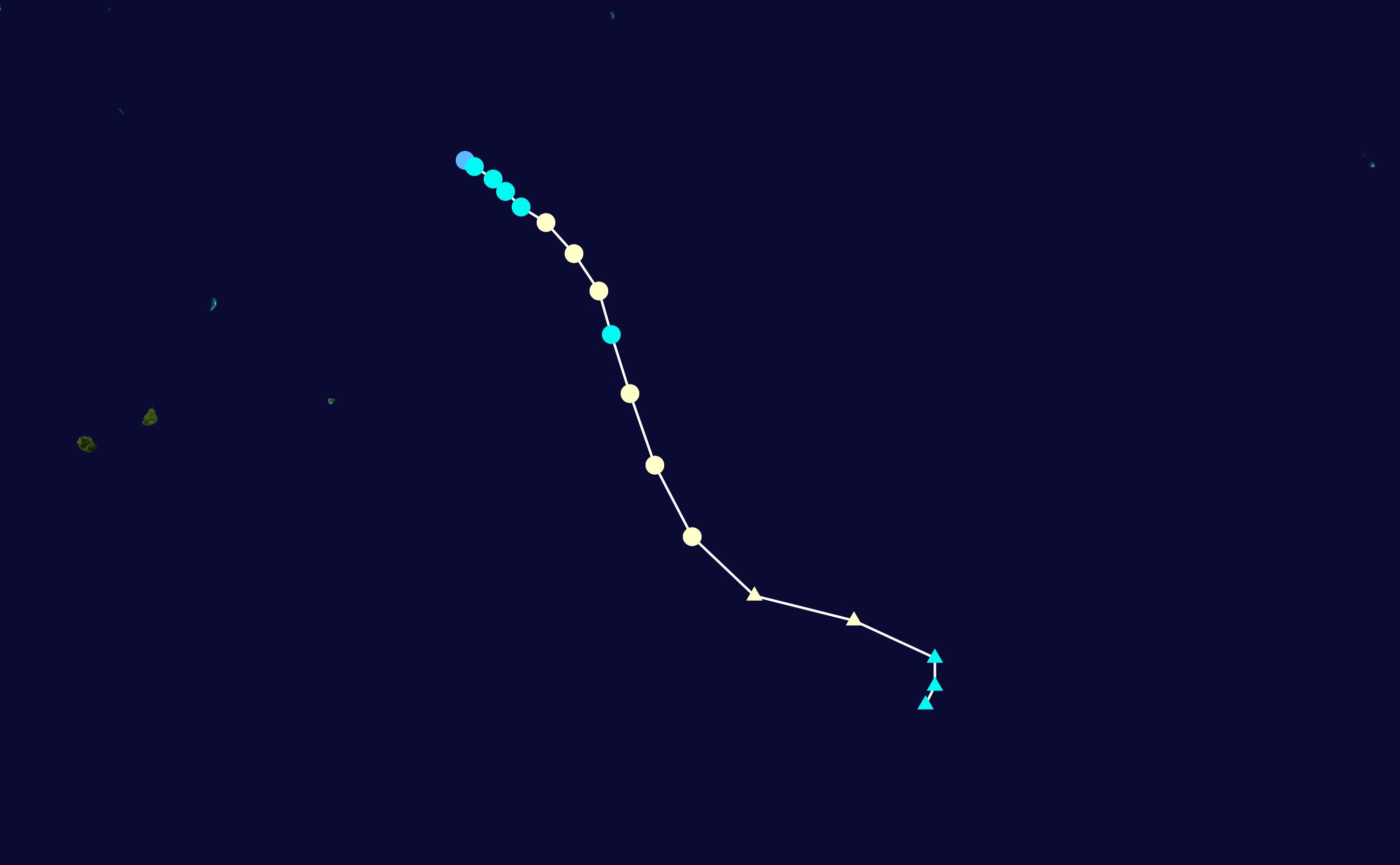
- Duration: March 18 – March 23
- Peak intensity: 95 km/h (60 mph) (10-min); 976 hPa (mbar)

== See also ==
- Tropical cyclones in 1978
- Atlantic hurricane seasons: 1977, 1978
- Eastern Pacific hurricane seasons: 1977, 1978
- Western Pacific typhoon seasons: 1977, 1978
- North Indian Ocean cyclone seasons: 1977, 1978
