= 1977 hurricane season =

1977 hurricane season may refer to:

- The 1977 Atlantic hurricane season
- The 1977 Pacific hurricane season
