= 1977 North Indian Ocean cyclone season =

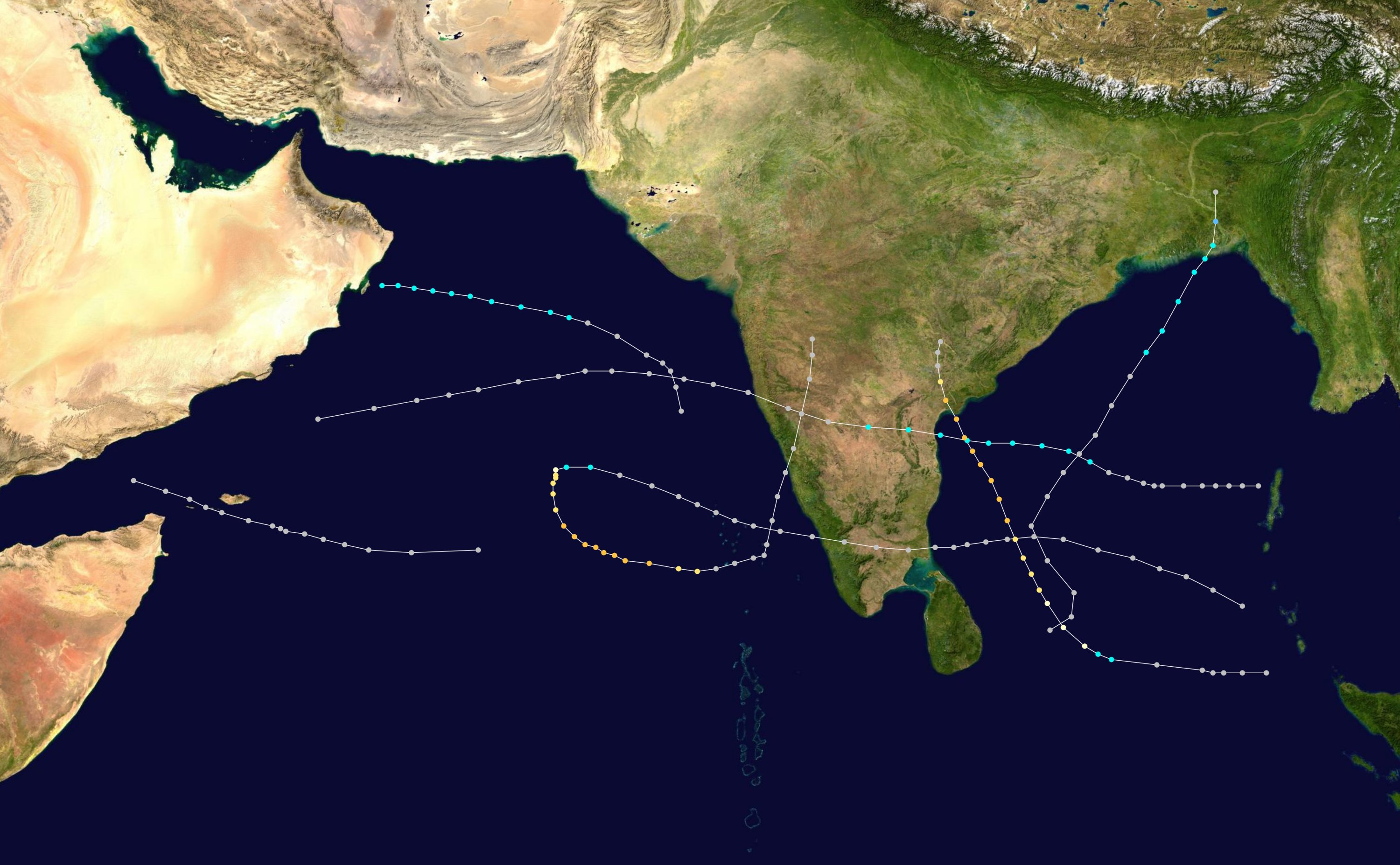
- Season summary map

Seasonal boundaries
- First system formed: May 9, 1977
- Last system dissipated: November 23, 1977

Strongest storm
- Name: "Andhra Pradesh"
  - Maximum winds: 230 km/h (145 mph) (3-minute sustained)
  - Lowest pressure: 943 hPa (mbar)

Seasonal statistics
- Depressions: 18
- Cyclonic storms: 5
- Severe cyclonic storms: 5
- Super cyclonic storms: 1
- Total fatalities: >10,105
- Total damage: Unknown

Related articles
- 1977 Atlantic hurricane season; 1977 Pacific hurricane season; 1977 Pacific typhoon season

The 1977 North Indian Ocean cyclone season was part of the annual cycle of tropical cyclone formation. The season has no official bounds but cyclones tend to form between April and December. These dates conventionally delimit the period of each year when most tropical cyclones form in the northern Indian Ocean. There are two main seas in the North Indian Ocean—the Bay of Bengal to the east of the Indian subcontinent and the Arabian Sea to the west of India. The official Regional Specialized Meteorological Centre in this basin is the India Meteorological Department (IMD), while the Joint Typhoon Warning Center (JTWC) releases unofficial advisories. An average of five tropical cyclones form in the North Indian Ocean every season with peaks in May and November. Cyclones occurring between the meridians 45°E and 100°E are included in the season by the IMD.

== Systems ==
=== Tropical Storm One (01B) ===
- Severe cyclonic storm (IMD)
- Tropical storm (SSHWS)
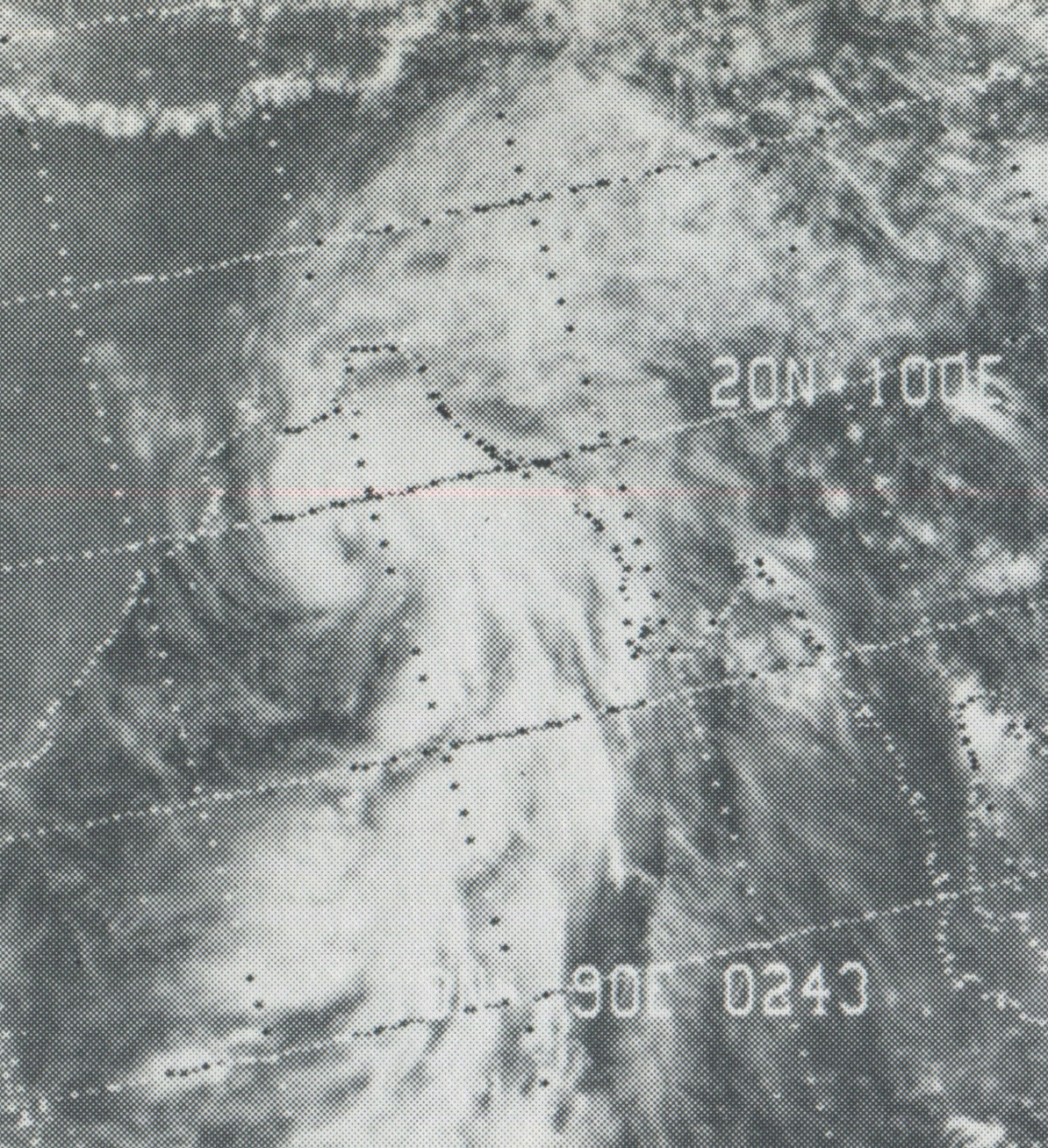
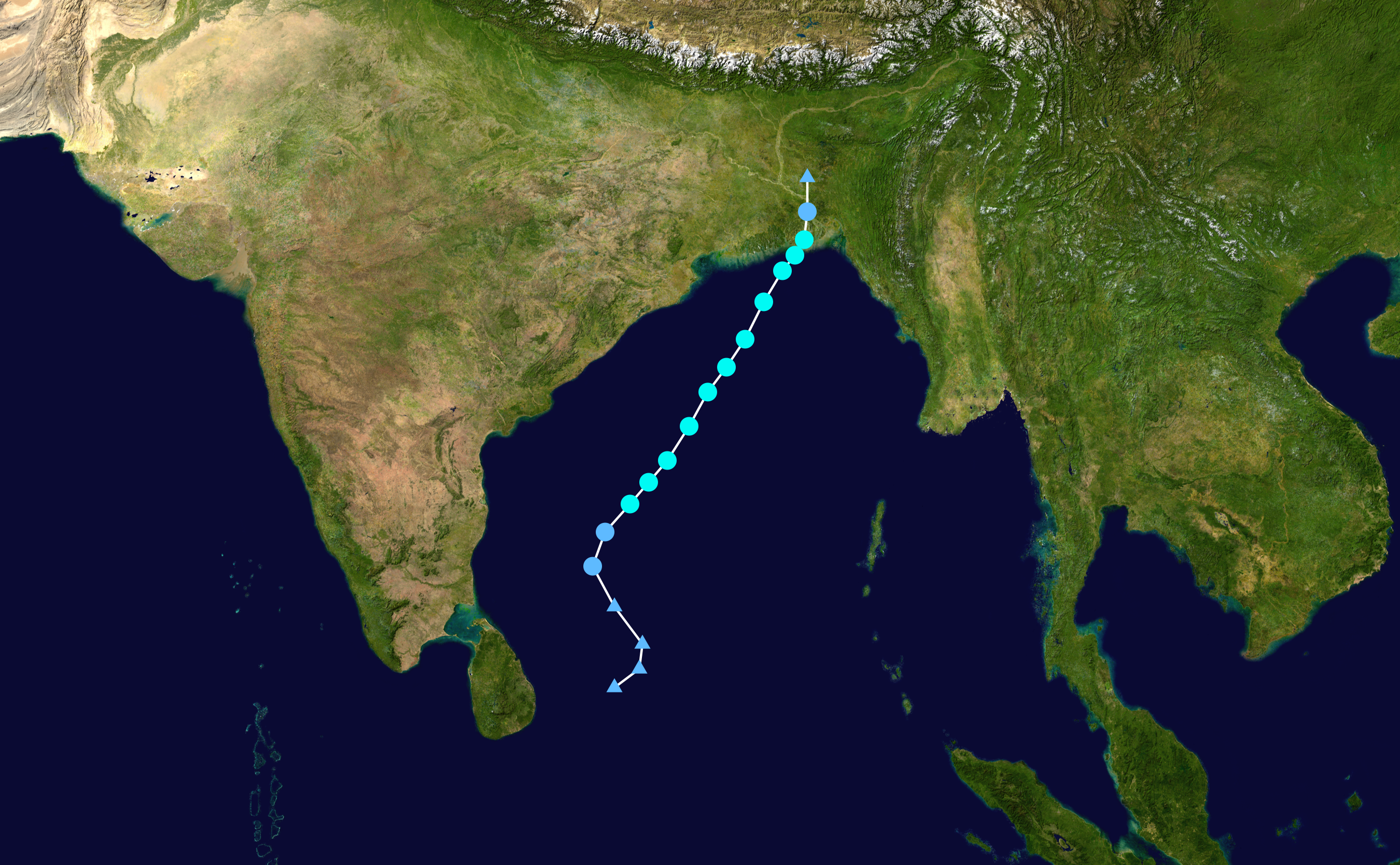
- Duration: May 9 – May 13
- Peak intensity: 100 km/h (65 mph) (3-min);

=== Tropical Storm Two (02A) ===
- Extremely severe cyclonic storm (IMD)
- Tropical storm (SSHWS)
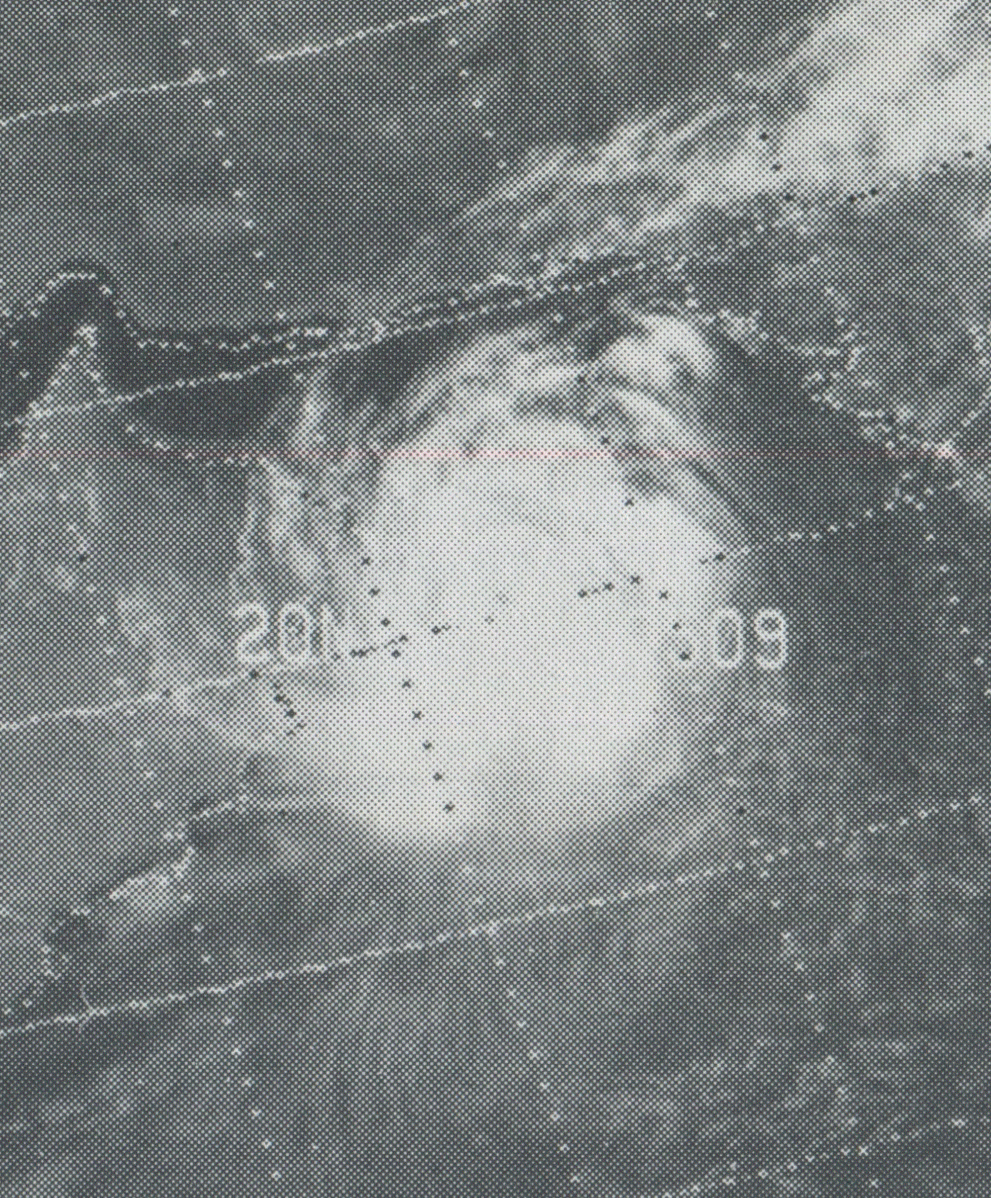
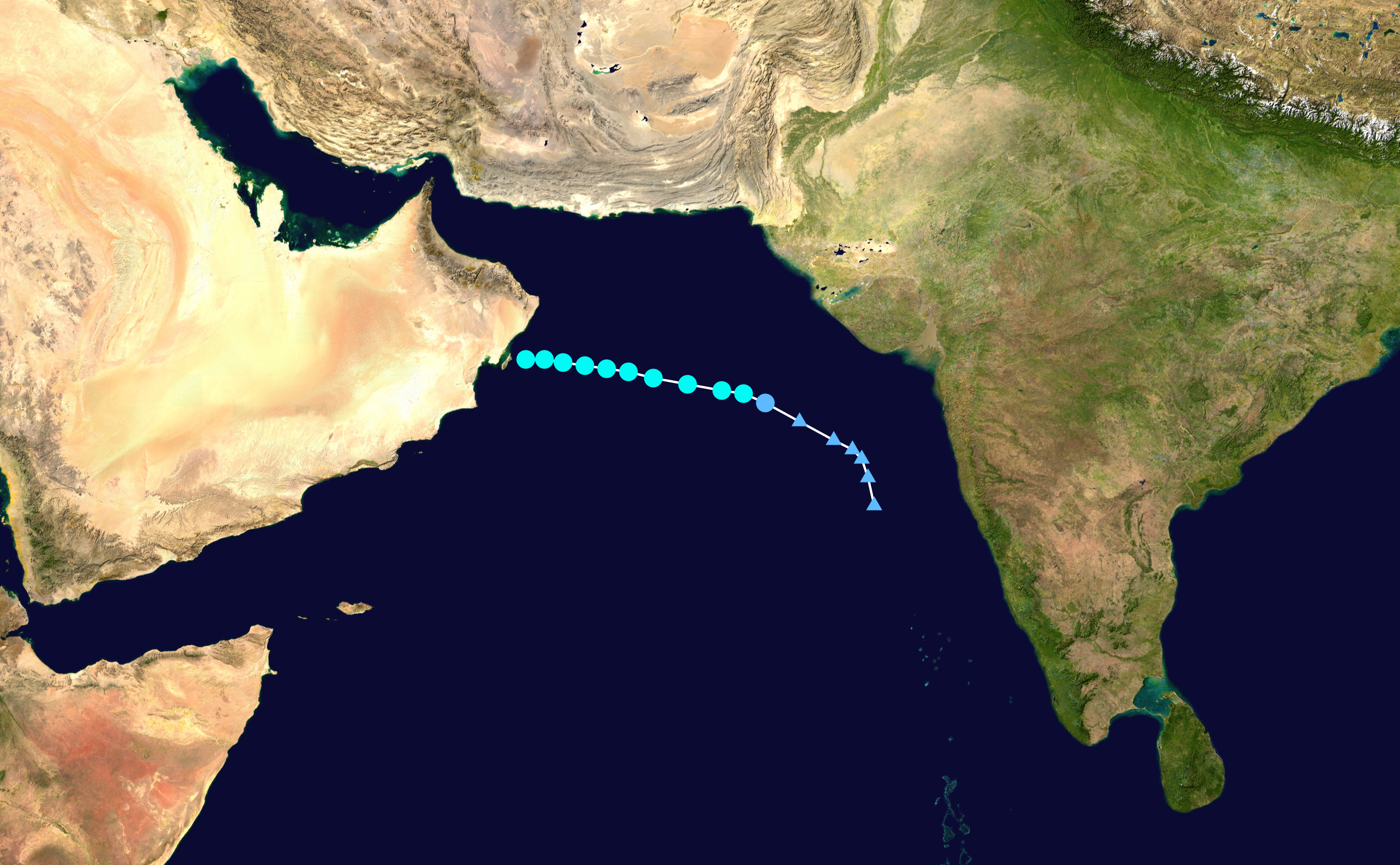
- Duration: June 9 – June 13
- Peak intensity: 165 km/h (105 mph) (3-min); 959 hPa (mbar)

On June 9, a tropical disturbance was noted off the west coast of India in the Arabian Sea. The system moved northward, followed by a northwest turn on June 10 while the system intensified into a tropical storm. It curved toward the west, and the JTWC reported the cyclone as reaching peak winds of 70 mph (110 km/h) on June 11. The JTWC issued the final advisory at 0800 UTC on June 13 as the storm was making landfall on Masirah Island. The Oman Department of Meteorology reported the storm as being much stronger than the JTWC reported, with sustained winds of 105 mph (170 km/h) with gusts to 140 mph (230 km/h). Shortly after striking Masirah, the storm moved ashore mainland Oman, causing rapid weakening to tropical depression status. The system dissipated on June 14 after crossing into southeastern Saudi Arabia.

The cyclone was the strongest on record to make landfall on the Arabian Peninsula, until Cyclone Gonu surpassed it in 2007. Overall, the cyclone caused 105 deaths and 48 injuries, and 50,000 people were left homeless.

=== Tropical Storm Three (03A) ===
- Deep depression (IMD)
- Tropical storm (SSHWS)
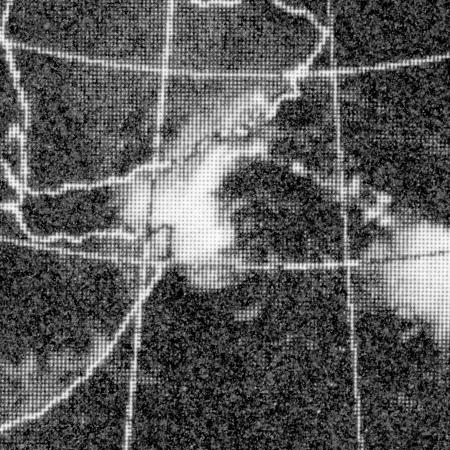
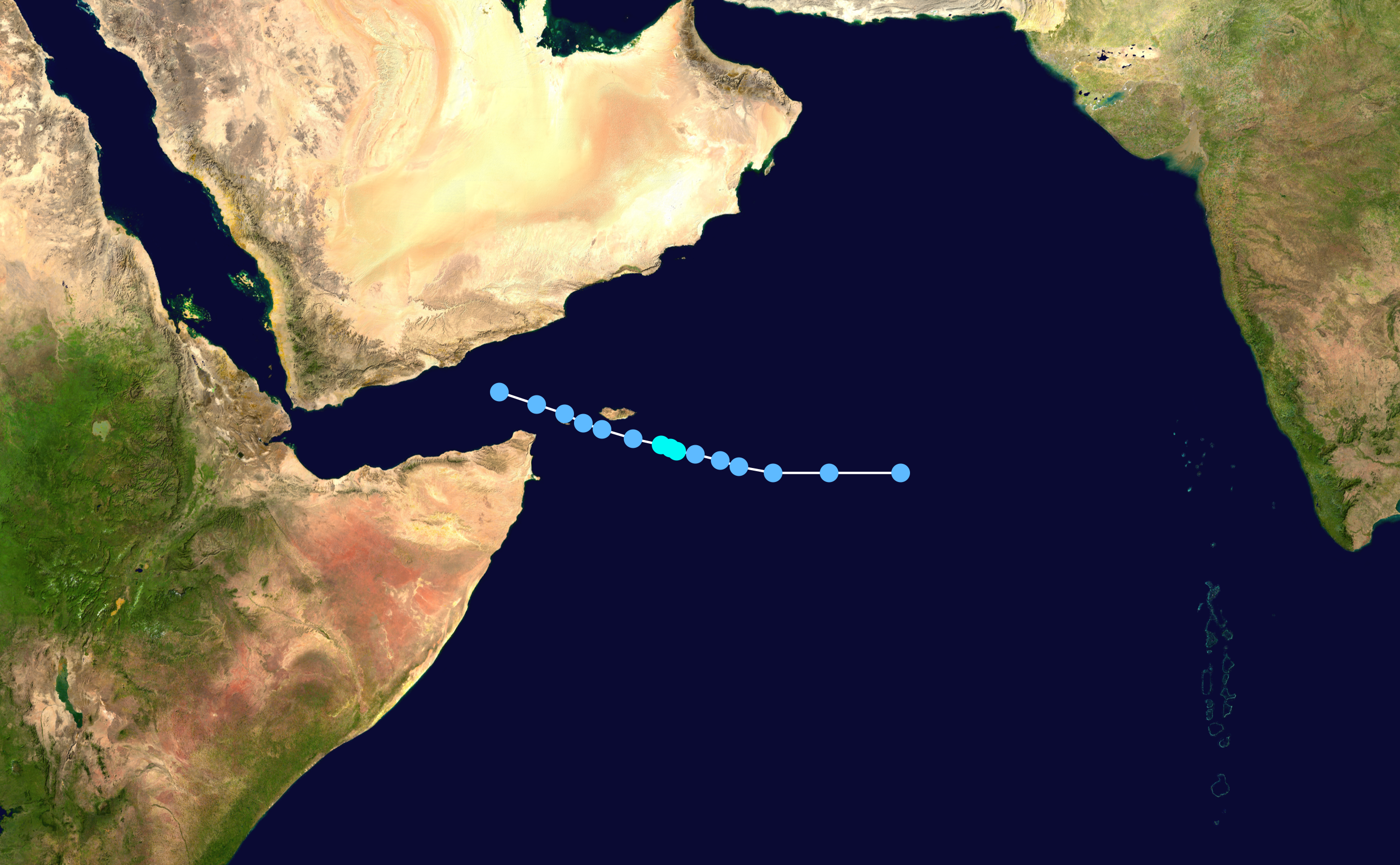
- Duration: October 19 – October 22
- Peak intensity: 55 km/h (35 mph) (3-min);

=== Tropical Storm Four (04B) ===
- Cyclonic storm (IMD)
- Tropical storm (SSHWS)
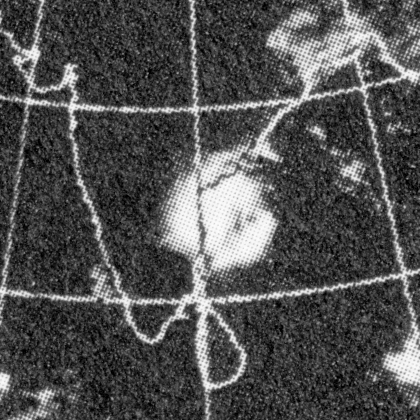
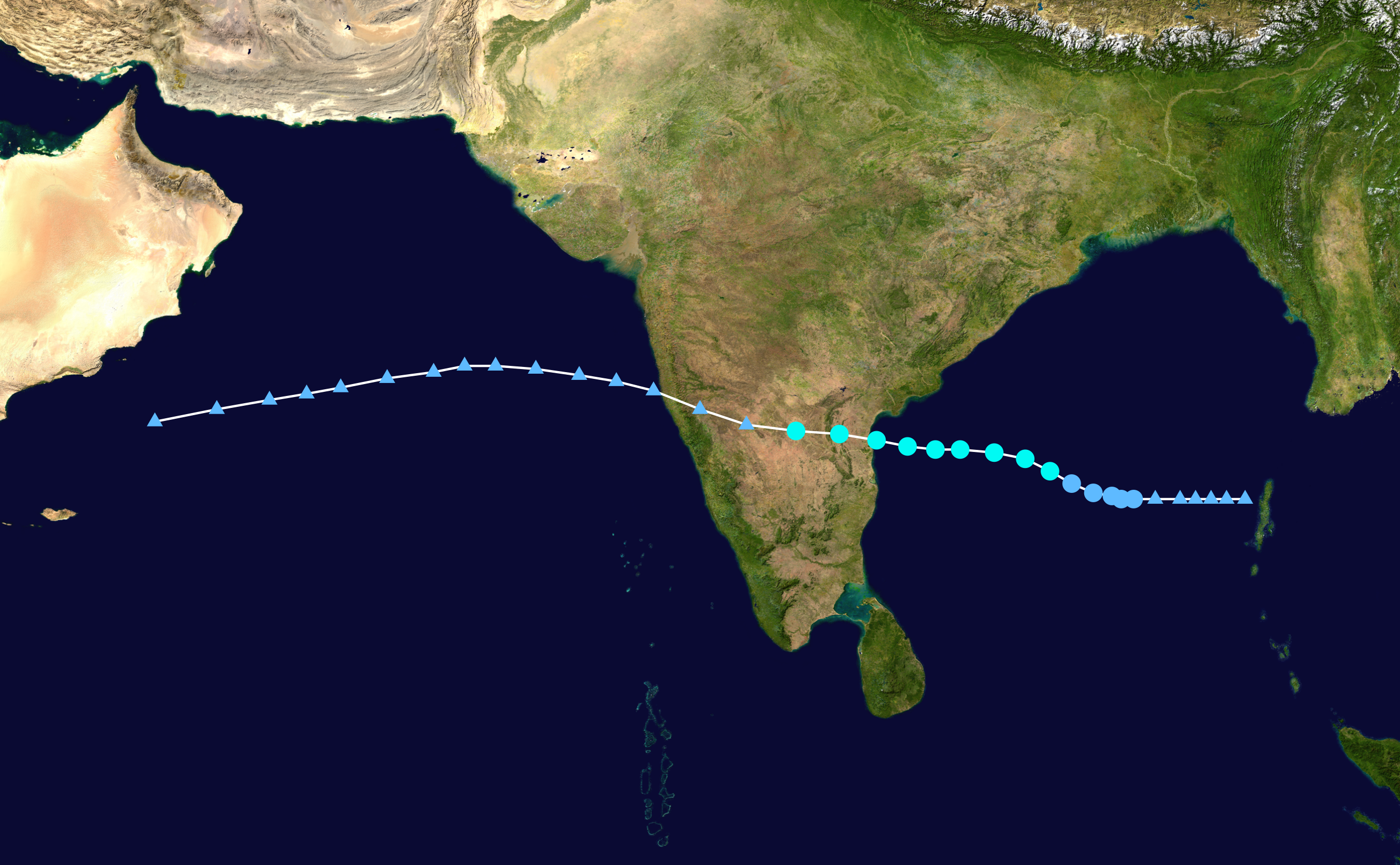
- Duration: October 27 – November 4
- Peak intensity: 85 km/h (50 mph) (3-min);

This cyclone was formed on 27 October and maintained the intensity as a Cyclonic Storm. The storm made landfall between Nellore and Kavali in Andhra Pradesh on 31 October. Its remnants tracked into the Arabian Sea by the next day. It meandered at the same place for three more days until dissipated on 4 November. Nearly 80 km of telegram line was cut off between Singarayakonda and Kovvur due to the storm which disrupted the telegraph connection between Andhra and other states of India. It also caused huge damages to agricultural crops and property.

=== Cyclone Five (05B) ===
- Extremely severe cyclonic storm (IMD)
- Category 1 tropical cyclone (SSHWS)
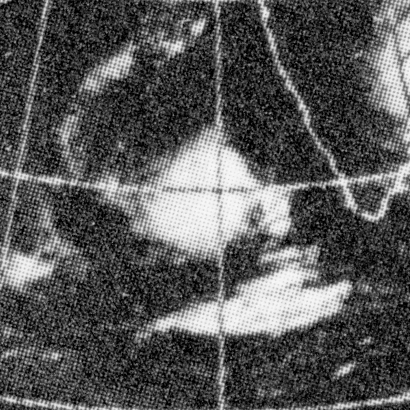
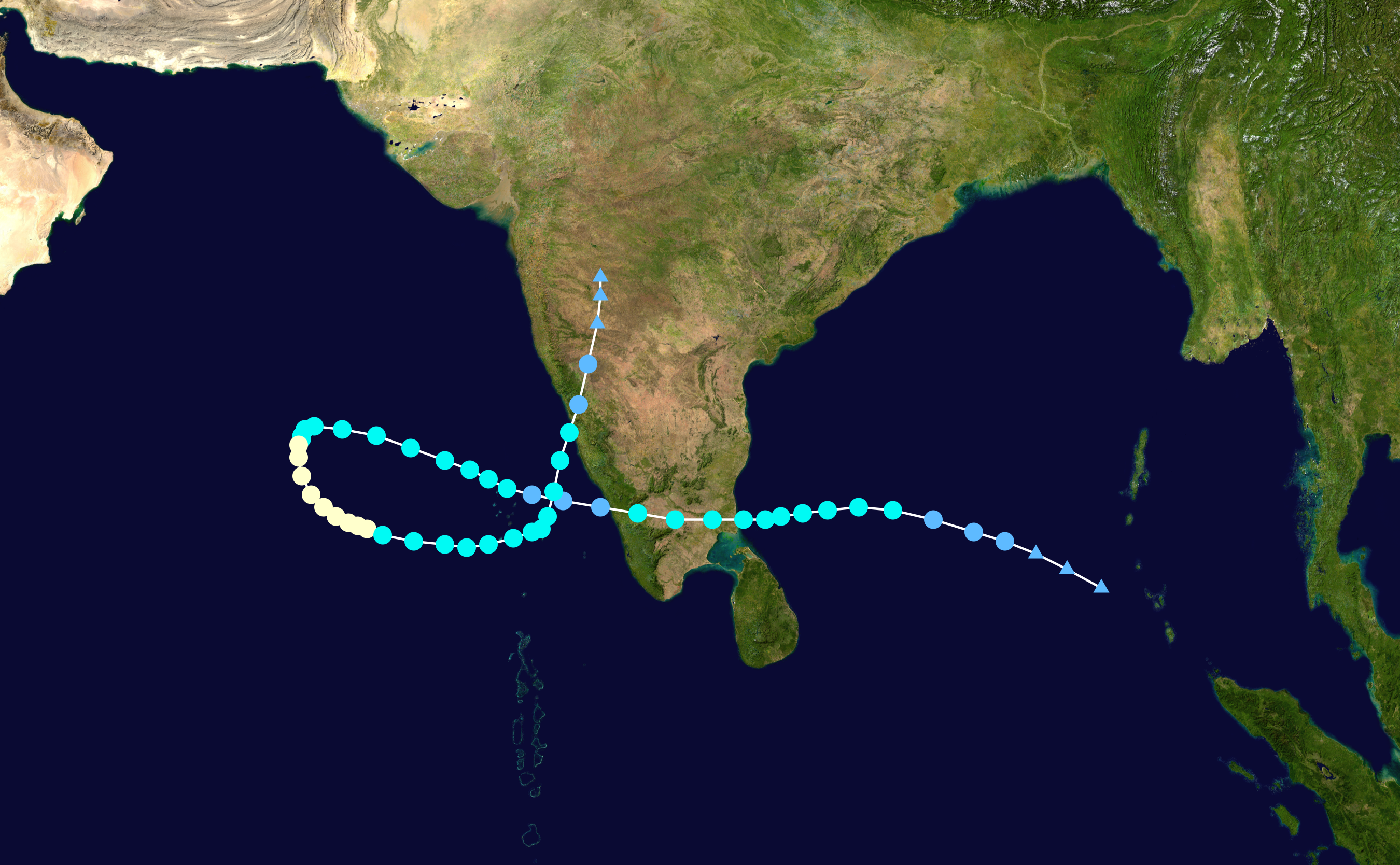
- Duration: November 8 – November 23
- Peak intensity: 165 km/h (105 mph) (3-min);

The cyclone formed on November 8 in the Bay of Bengal. It gradually intensified into a Category 1-equivalent cyclone, being classified as a Very Severe Cyclonic Storm on November 12. On the same day, the storm made landfall at Nagapattinam in Tamilnadu at its peak intensity. It emerged into the Arabian Sea off the Kerala coast as a Deep Depression on November 13. It re-intensified into a Severe Cyclonic Storm while making an anticlockwise loop. It then began to weaken rapidly as wind shear tore apart its structure. It made its second landfall at Honnavar in Karnataka as a Depression on November 22 and dissipated on November 23.

Many places in the Nagapattinam, Thanjavur, Tiruchirappalli, and Thiruvarur districts received wind gusts up to 165 kmph. 23,000 cattle perished and 560 people were reported to be killed by the storm. 10 Lakh people were affected in Tamil Nadu by the storm. Damages in Indian Rupees were estimated to be 155 crores. During its second landfall at Karnataka, only minor damages were reported to the fishing hamlets there.

During its existence over the Arabian Sea, the storm coexisted with the 1977 Andhra Pradesh cyclone which was the first time in the satellite era in the basin to have two cyclones on the either side of the North Indian Ocean (Bay of Bengal and Arabian Sea). The next time this happened was in 2018 with Cyclone Titli and Cyclone Luban. If the whole duration of the storm is considered, the cyclone is the longest-lasting storm in the North Indian Ocean basin on record. However, the India Meteorological Department considers it two different cyclones.

=== Cyclone Six (06B) ===
- Super cyclonic storm (IMD)
- Category 3 tropical cyclone (SSHWS)
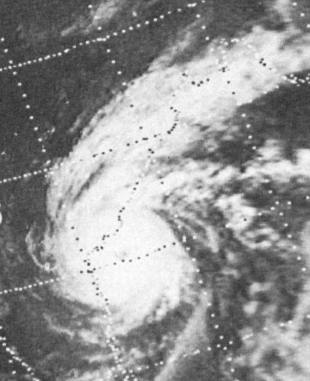
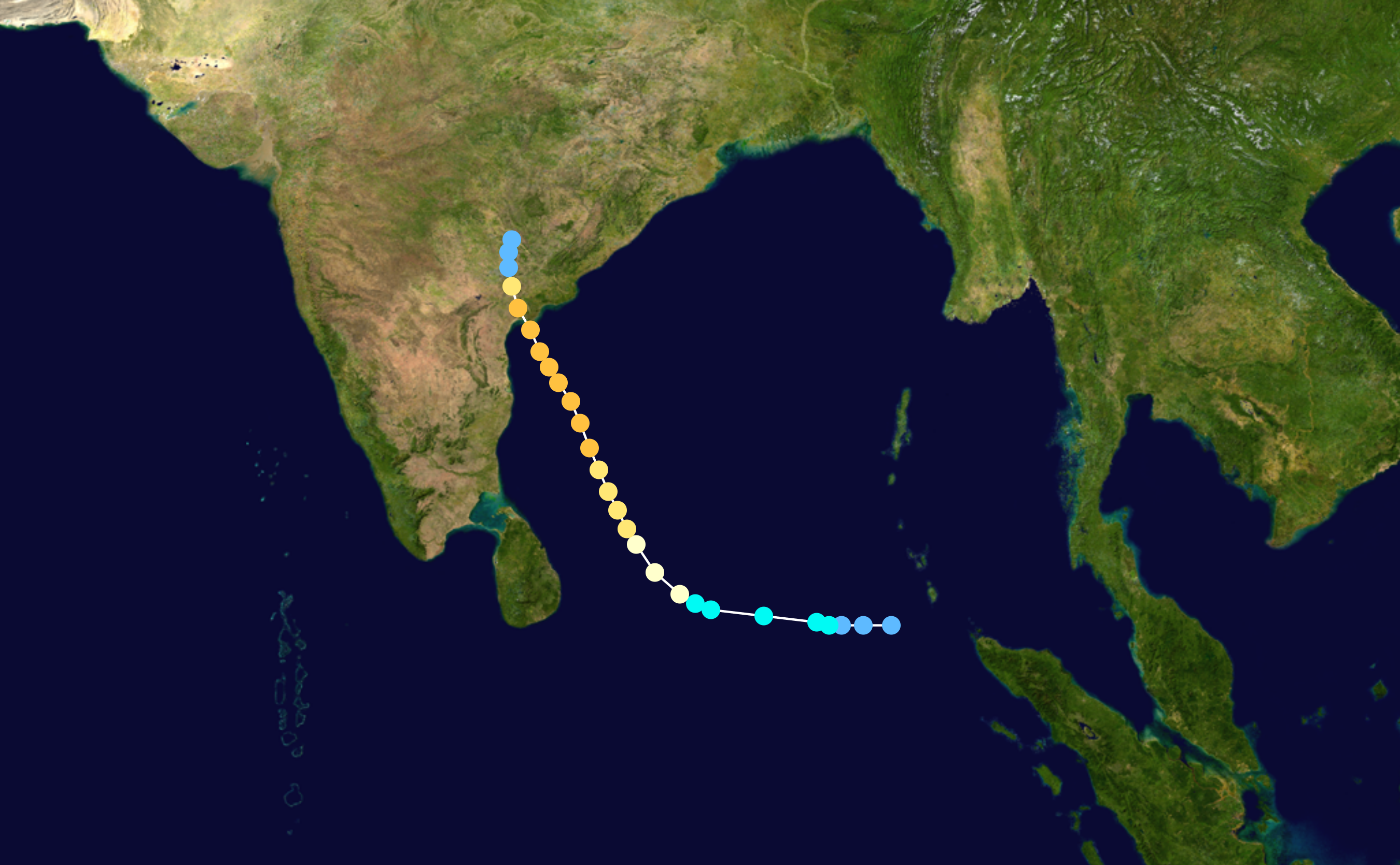
- Duration: November 14 – November 20
- Peak intensity: 230 km/h (145 mph) (3-min); 943 hPa (mbar)

The monsoon trough spawned a tropical depression on November 14. It tracked westward, becoming a tropical storm on the November 15 and a cyclone on November 16. A break in the subtropical ridge pulled the cyclone northward, where it slowly strengthened to a peak of 125 mph winds. It hit the Andhra Pradesh coastline on November 19 at that intensity, and dissipated the next day. Strong winds, heavy flooding, and storm surge of 5 meters high killed 10,000 people, left hundreds of thousands homeless, killed 40,000 cattle. and destroyed 40% of India's food grains.

== See also ==
- North Indian Ocean tropical cyclone
- 1977 Atlantic hurricane season
- 1977 Pacific hurricane season
- 1977 Pacific typhoon season
- Australian cyclone seasons: 1976–77, 1977–78
- South Pacific cyclone seasons: 1976–77, 1977–78
- South-West Indian Ocean cyclone seasons: 1976–77, 1977–78
