= 1976–77 South Pacific cyclone season =

Tropical cyclone season

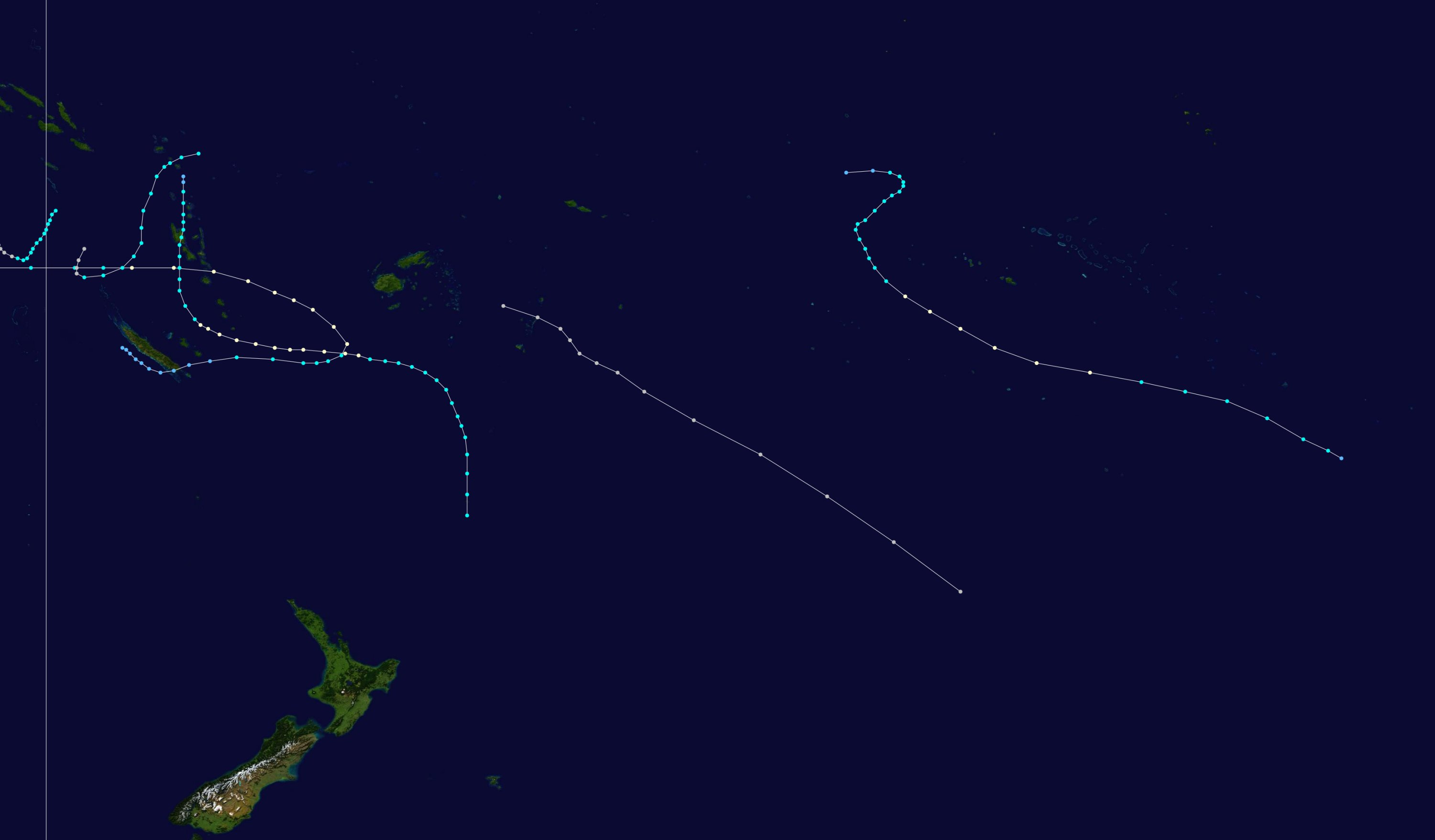
- Season summary map

Seasonal boundaries
- First system formed: December 9, 1976
- Last system dissipated: April 23, 1977

Strongest storm
- Name: Robert
  - Maximum winds: 130 km/h (80 mph) (11-minute sustained)
  - Lowest pressure: 965 hPa (mbar)

Seasonal statistics
- Total disturbances: 9
- Tropical cyclones: 9
- Severe tropical cyclones: 2
- Total fatalities: Unknown
- Total damage: Unknown

Related articles
- 1976–77 South-West Indian Ocean cyclone season; 1976–77 Australian region cyclone season

The 1976–77 South Pacific cyclone season began with the formation of Cyclone Kim on December 9, 1976, and ended with the dissipation of Cyclone Robert on April 23, 1977. The majority of systems were Category 2 strength, with two each falling into Categories 1 and 3. There were no storms of Category 4 or higher.

== Systems ==
=== Tropical Cyclone Kim ===
- Category 2 tropical cyclone (Australian scale)
- Tropical storm (SSHWS)
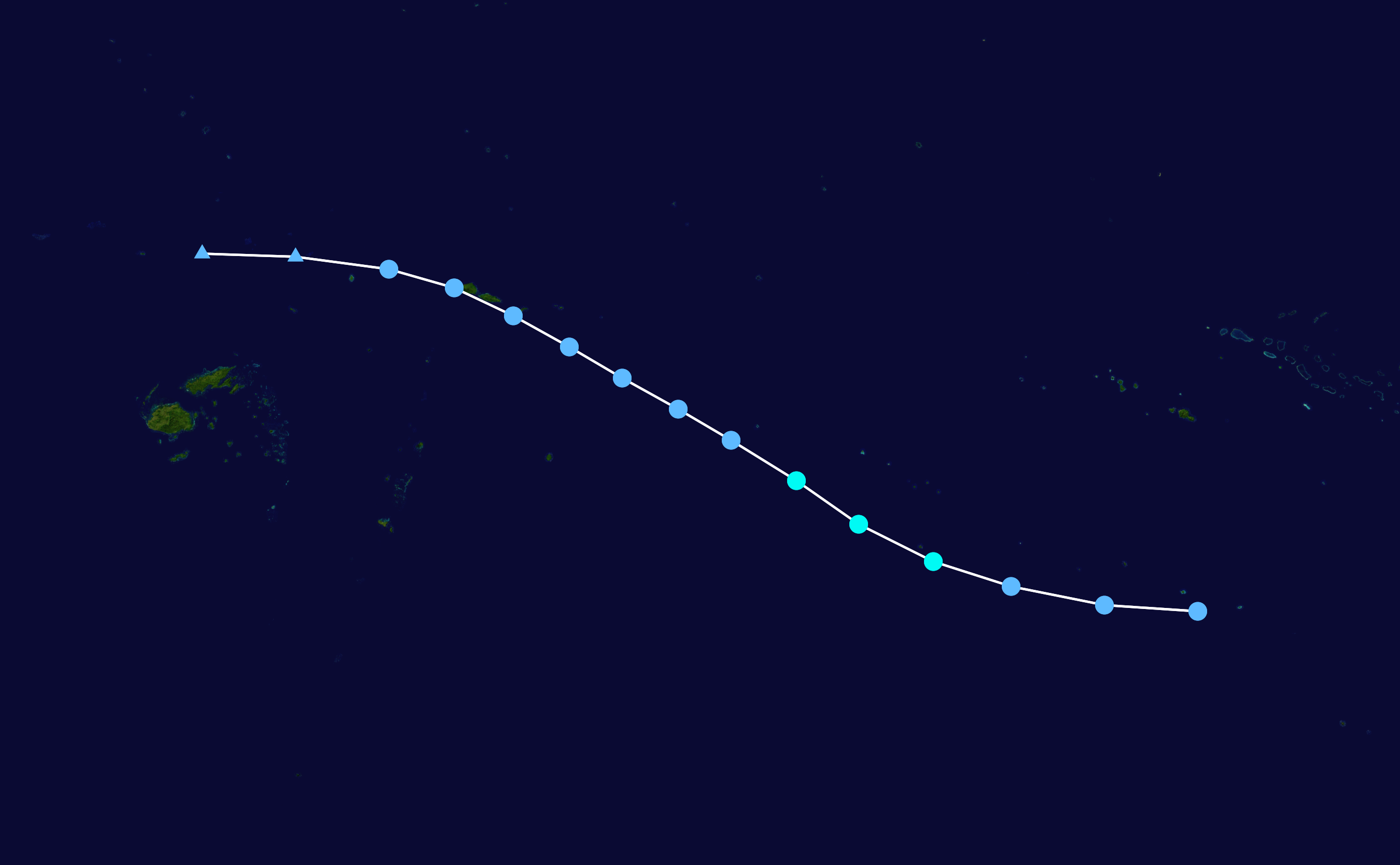
- Duration: December 9 – December 13
- Peak intensity: 100 km/h (65 mph) (10-min); 980 hPa (mbar)

=== Tropical Cyclone Laurie ===
- Category 2 tropical cyclone (Australian scale)
- Tropical storm (SSHWS)
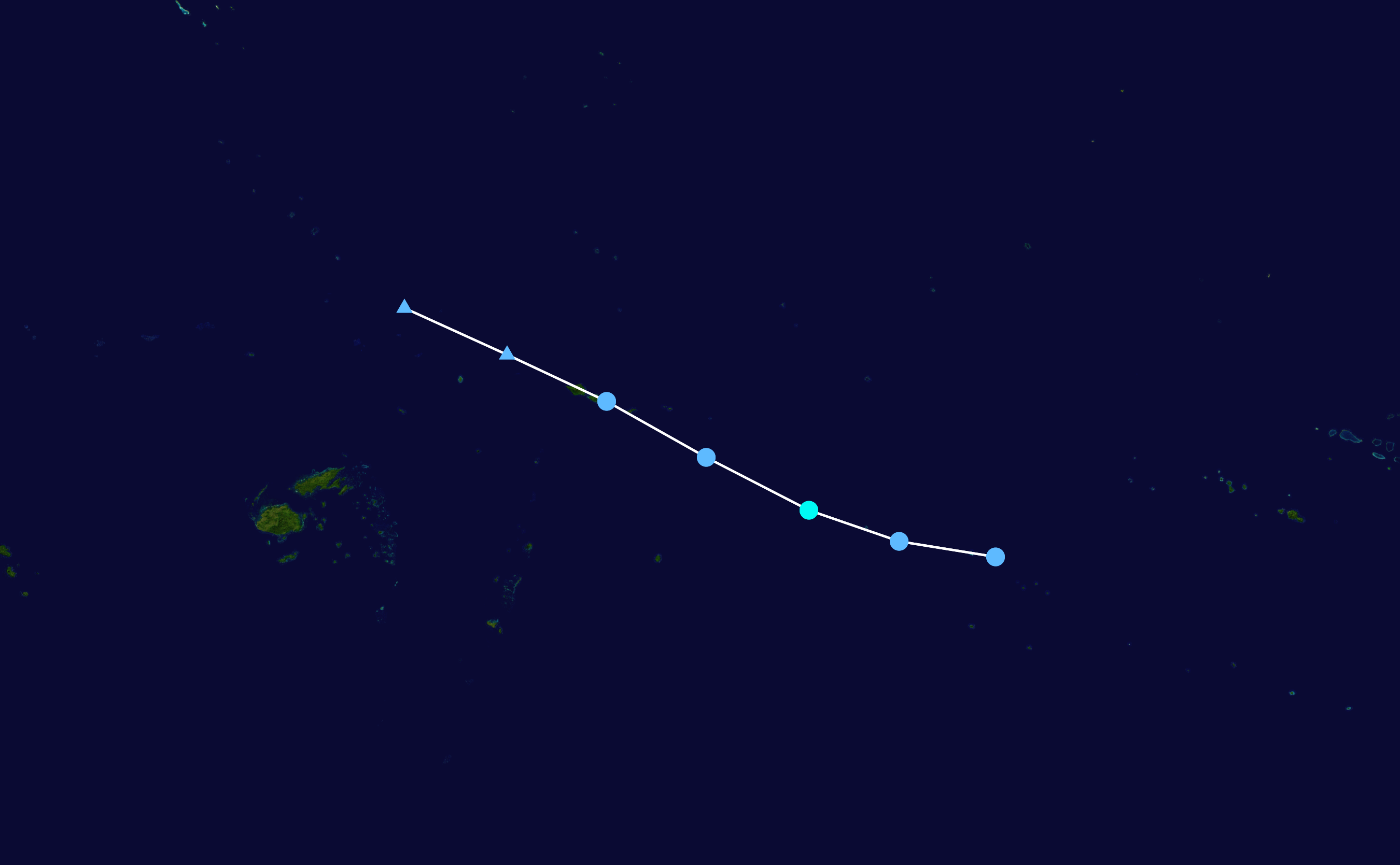
- Duration: December 11 – December 12
- Peak intensity: 100 km/h (65 mph) (10-min); 980 hPa (mbar)

=== Tropical Cyclone Marion ===
- Category 2 tropical cyclone (Australian scale)
- Category 1 tropical cyclone (SSHWS)
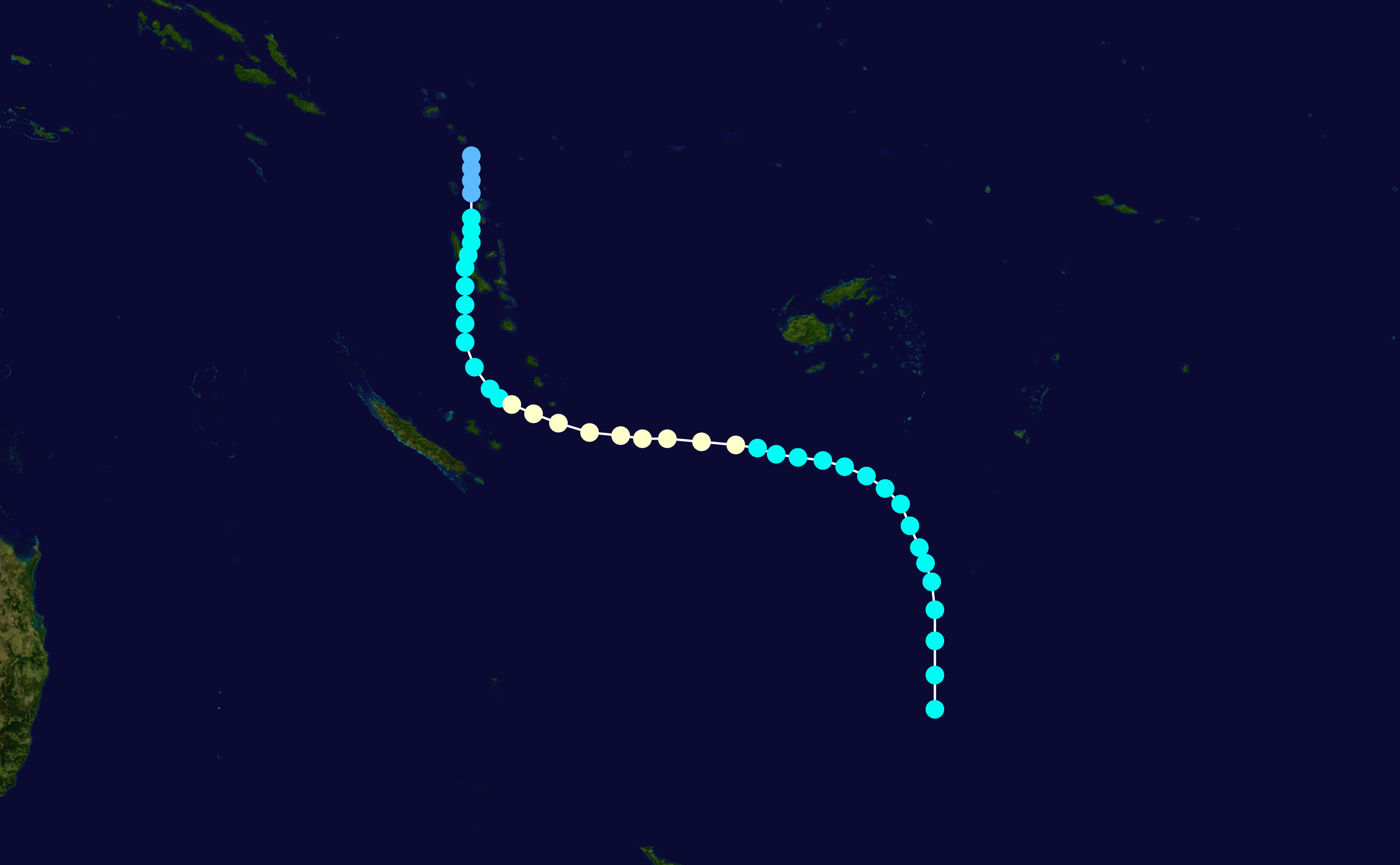
- Duration: January 11 – January 21
- Peak intensity: 100 km/h (65 mph) (10-min); 980 hPa (mbar)

=== Severe Tropical Cyclone June ===
- Category 3 severe tropical cyclone (Australian scale)
- Category 1 tropical cyclone (SSHWS)
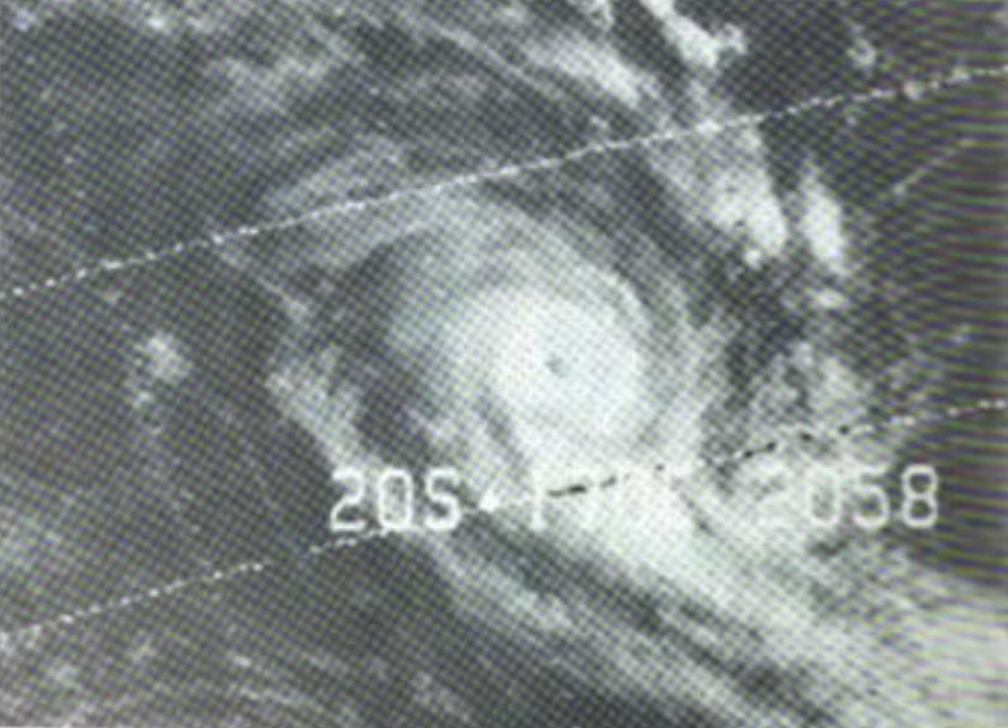
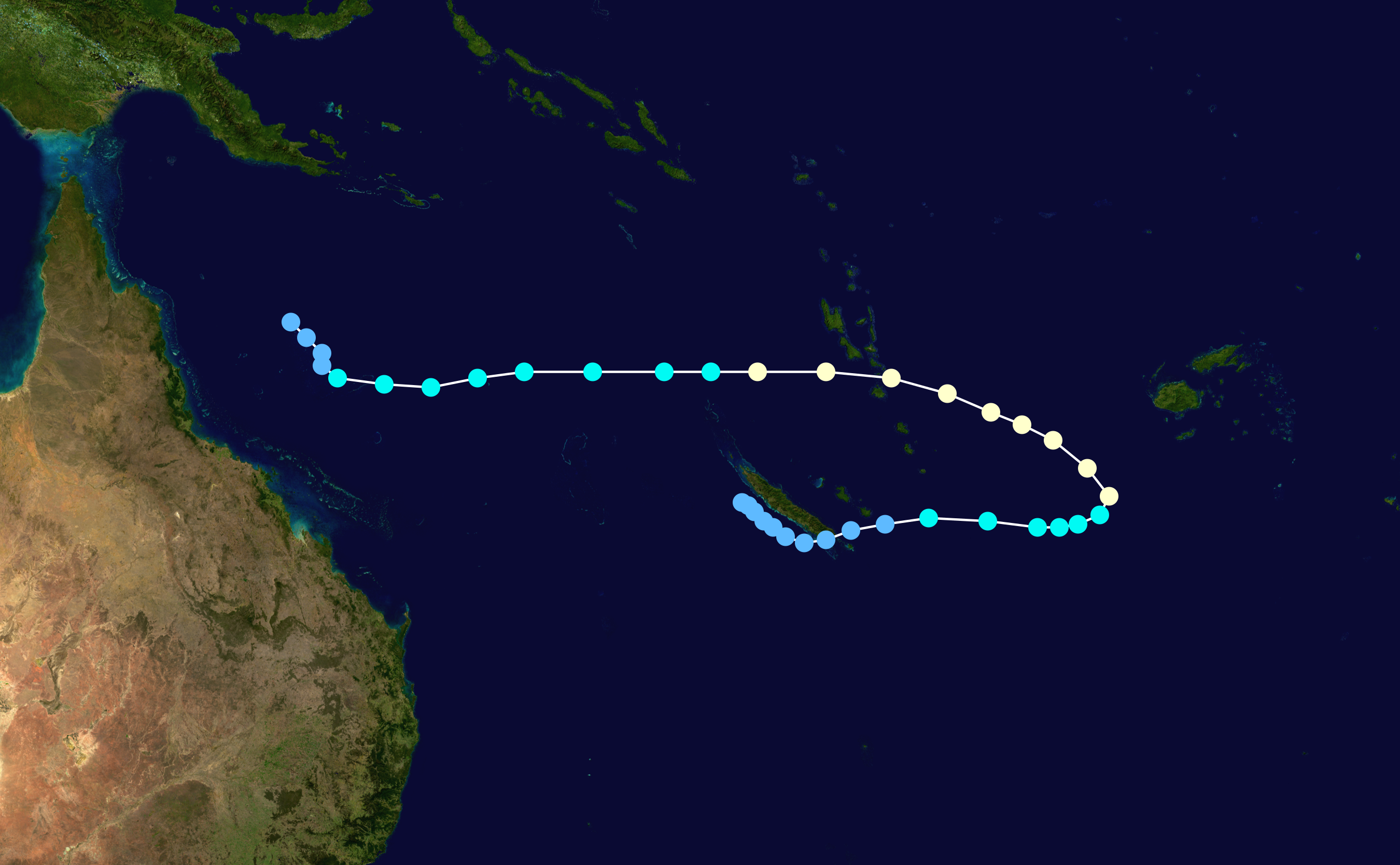
- Duration: January 19 – January 26
- Peak intensity: 130 km/h (80 mph) (10-min); 965 hPa (mbar)

=== Unnamed Tropical Cyclone ===
- Category 1 tropical cyclone (Australian scale)
- Tropical storm (SSHWS)
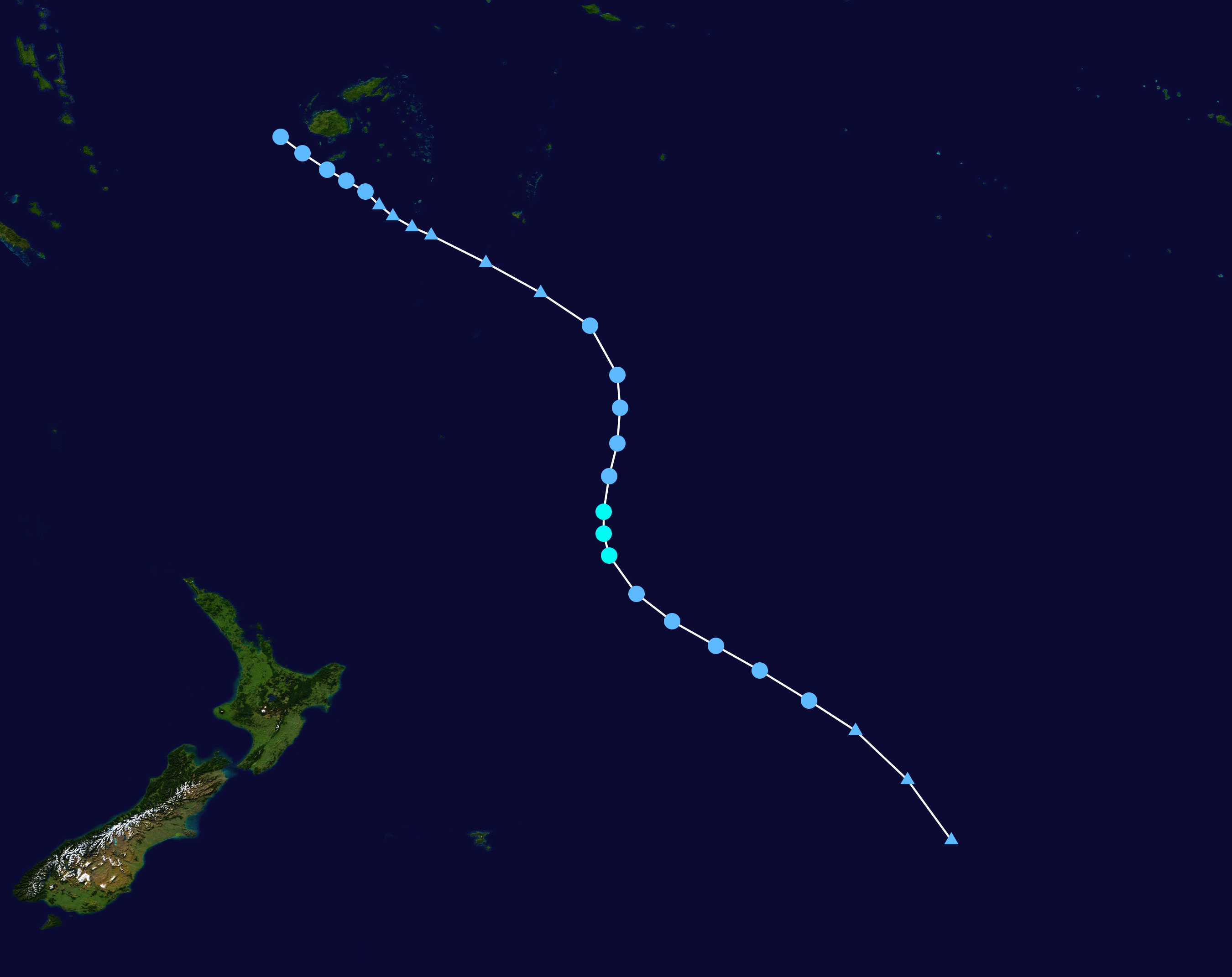
- Duration: February 3 – February 9
- Peak intensity: 75 km/h (45 mph) (10-min); 990 hPa (mbar)

=== Unnamed Tropical Cyclone ===
- Category 1 tropical cyclone (Australian scale)
- Tropical storm (SSHWS)
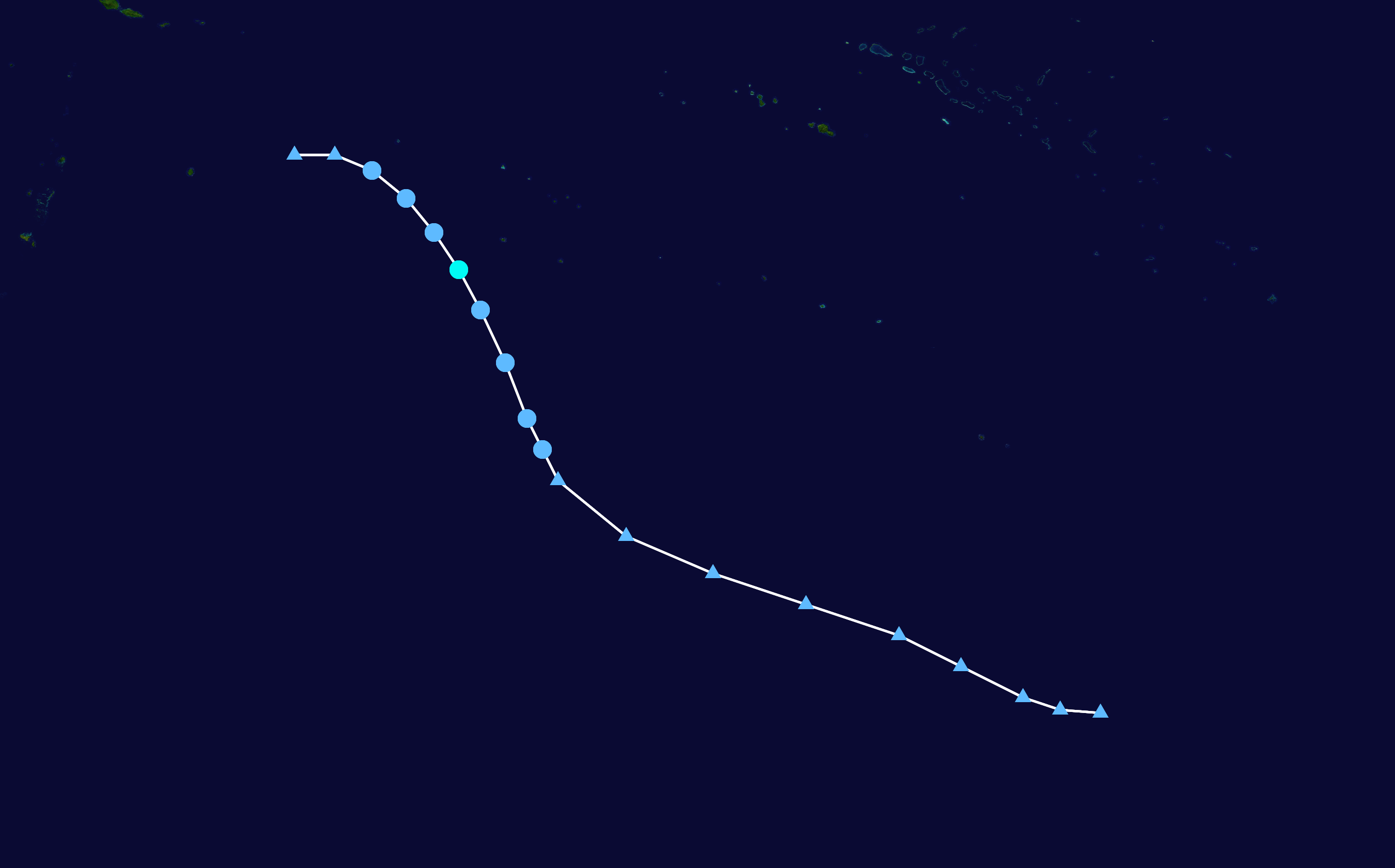
- Duration: February 20 – February 24
- Peak intensity: 75 km/h (45 mph) (10-min); 990 hPa (mbar)

=== Tropical Cyclone Norman ===
- Category 2 tropical cyclone (Australian scale)
- Tropical storm (SSHWS)
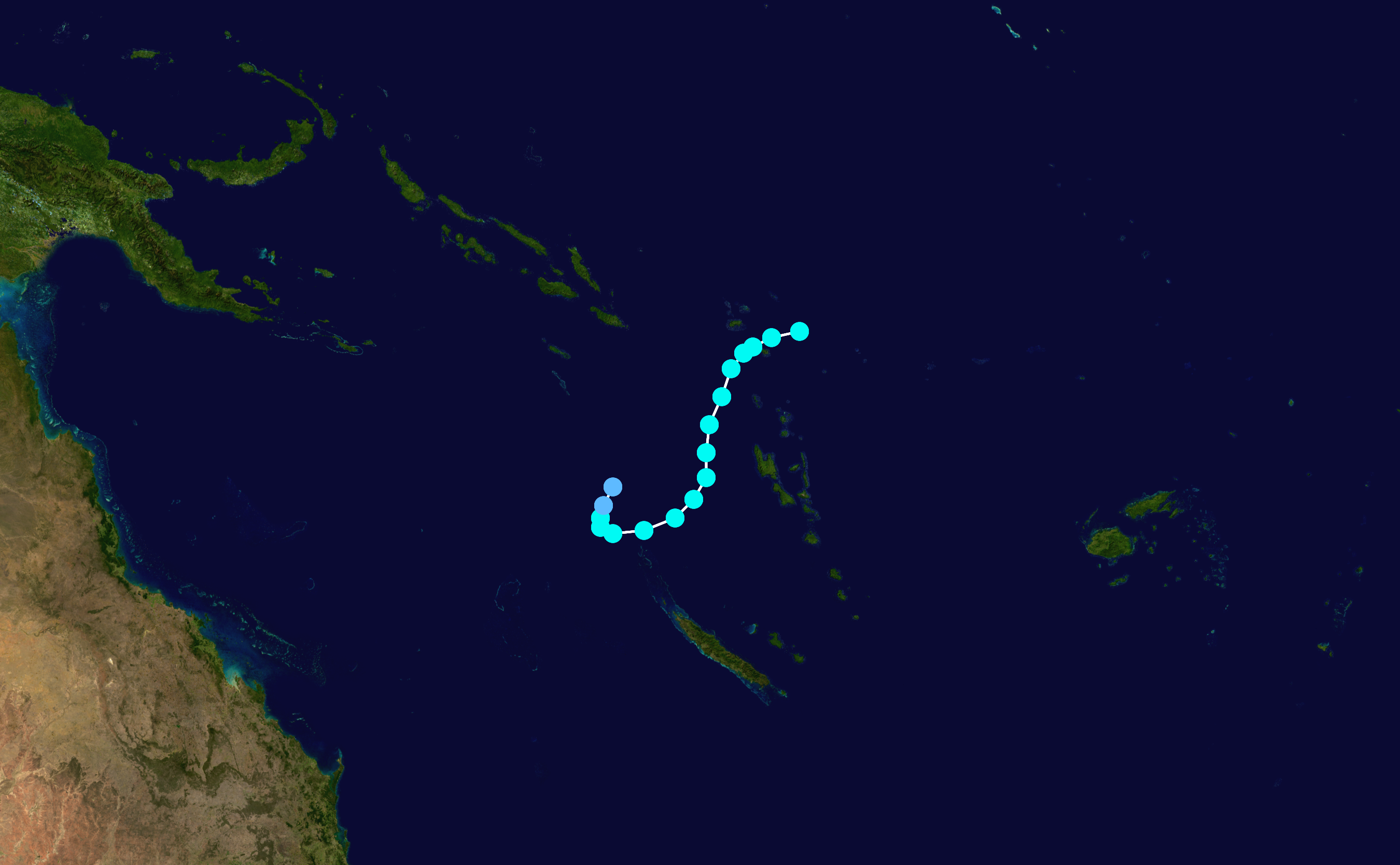
- Duration: March 9 – March 24
- Peak intensity: 100 km/h (65 mph) (10-min); 980 hPa (mbar)

=== Tropical Cyclone Pat ===
- Category 2 tropical cyclone (Australian scale)
- Tropical storm (SSHWS)
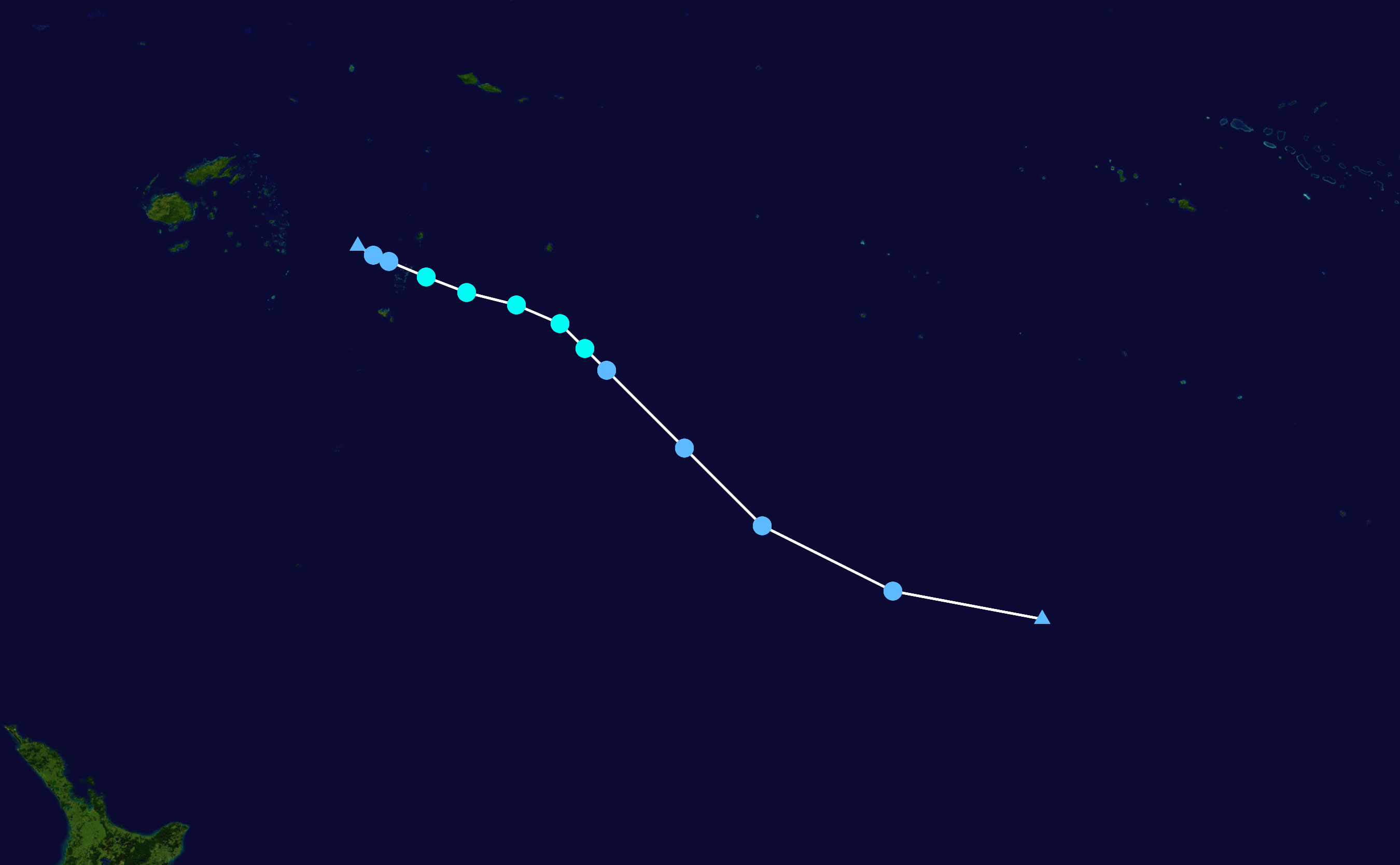
- Duration: March 17 – March 18
- Peak intensity: 100 km/h (65 mph) (10-min); 980 hPa (mbar)

=== Severe Tropical Cyclone Robert ===
- Category 3 severe tropical cyclone (Australian scale)
- Category 1 tropical cyclone (SSHWS)
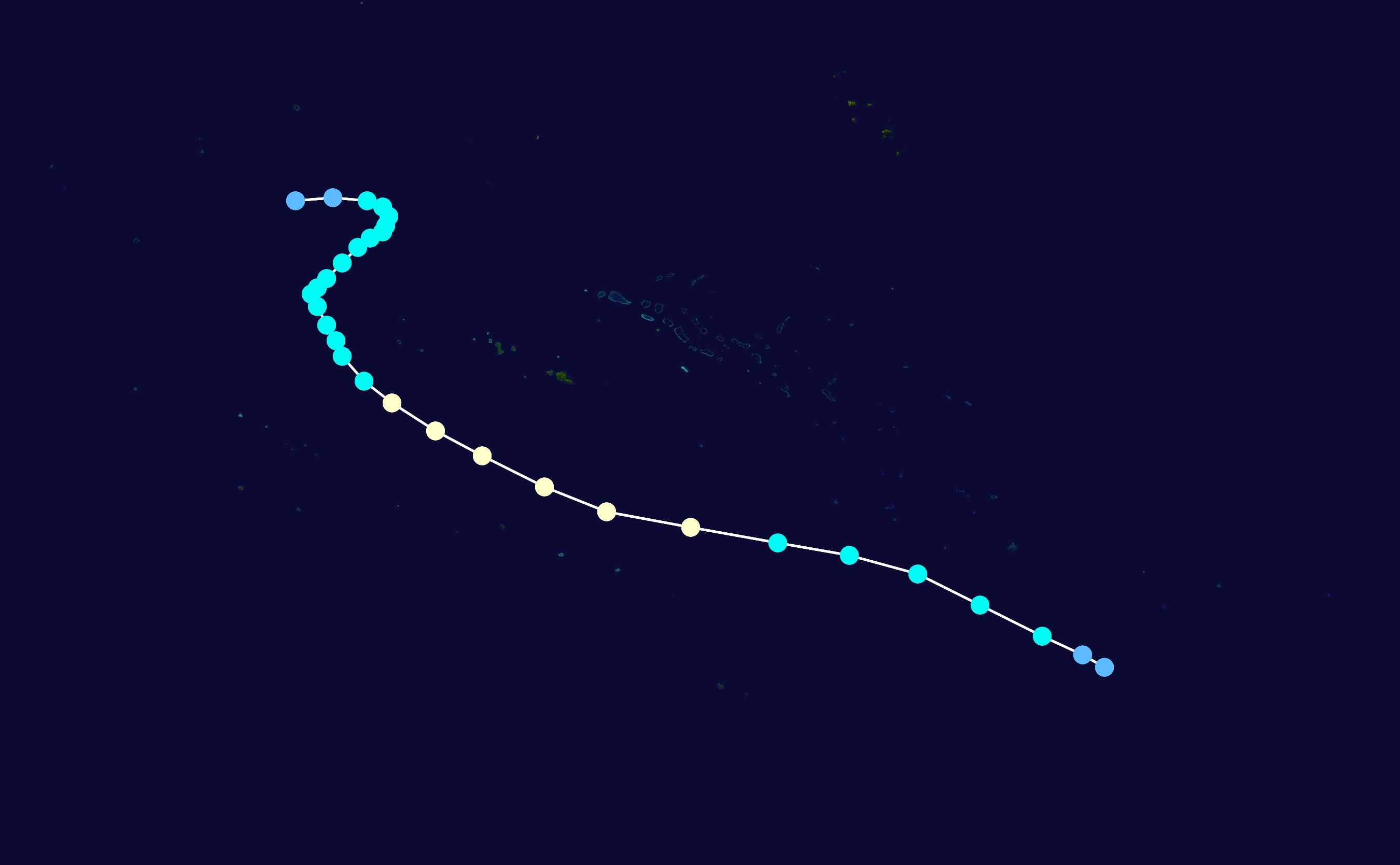
- Duration: April 16 – April 23
- Peak intensity: 130 km/h (80 mph) (10-min); 965 hPa (mbar)

== Season effects ==
Name	Dates	Peak intensity			Areas affected	Damage (USD)	Deaths	Ref(s).
Name	Dates	Category	Wind speed	Pressure	Areas affected	Damage (USD)	Deaths	Ref(s).
Kim	December 9 – 13	Category 2 tropical cyclone	100 km/h (65 mph)	980 hPa (28.94 inHg)				
Laurie	December 11 – 12	Category 2 tropical cyclone	100 km/h (65 mph)	980 hPa (28.94 inHg)				
Marion	January 11 – 21	Category 2 tropical cyclone	100 km/h (65 mph)	980 hPa (28.94 inHg)	Vanuatu	Unknown	None	
June	January 24 – February 5	Category 3 severe tropical cyclone	130 km/h (80 mph)	965 hPa (28.50 inHg)				
Unnamed	February 3 – 9	Category 1 tropical cyclone	65 km/h (40 mph)	990 hPa (29.23 inHg)				
Unnamed	February 20 – 24	Category 1 tropical cyclone	65 km/h (40 mph)	990 hPa (29.23 inHg)				
Norman	March 9 – 24	Category 2 tropical cyclone	100 km/h (65 mph)	980 hPa (28.94 inHg)				
Pat	March 17 – 18	Category 2 tropical cyclone	100 km/h (65 mph)	980 hPa (28.94 inHg)				
Robert	April 16 – 23	Category 3 severe tropical cyclone	130 km/h (80 mph)	965 hPa (28.50 inHg)				
Season aggregates
8 systems	December 9 – April 23		130 km/h (80 mph)	965 hPa (28.50 inHg)				

== See also ==
- Atlantic hurricane seasons: 1976, 1977
- Eastern Pacific hurricane seasons: 1976, 1977
- Western Pacific typhoon seasons: 1976, 1977
- North Indian Ocean cyclone seasons: 1976, 1977
