= 1977 Atlantic hurricane season =

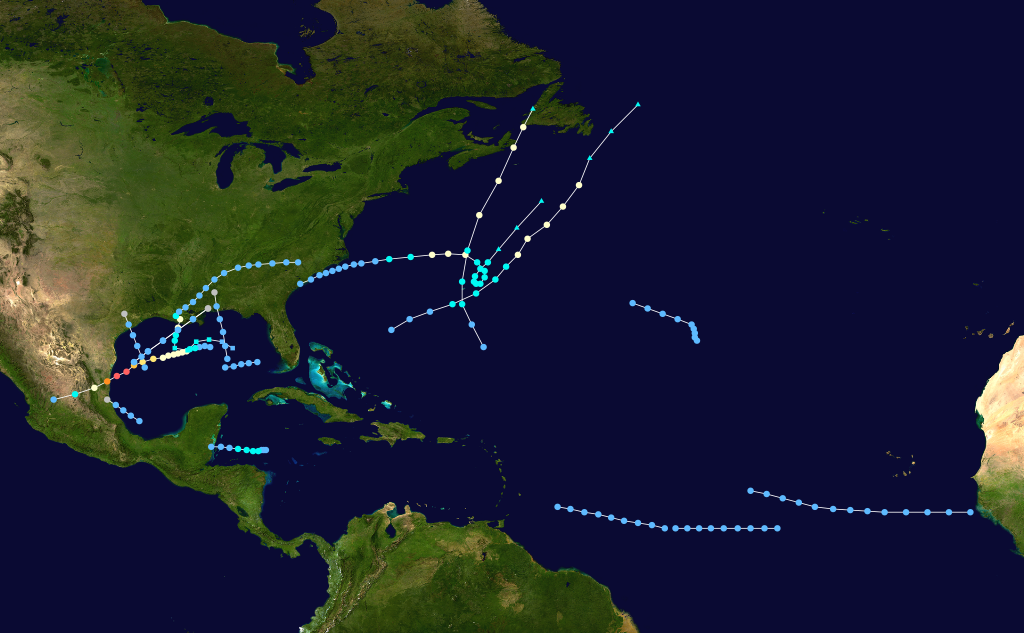
- Season summary map

Seasonal boundaries
- First system formed: June 13, 1977
- Last system dissipated: October 25, 1977

Strongest storm
- Name: Anita
  - Maximum winds: 175 mph (280 km/h) (1-minute sustained)
  - Lowest pressure: 926 mbar (hPa; 27.35 inHg)

Seasonal statistics
- Total depressions: 15
- Total storms: 6
- Hurricanes: 5
- Major hurricanes (Cat. 3+): 1
- Total fatalities: 64 total
- Total damage: > $216 million (1977 USD)

Related articles
- 1977 Pacific hurricane season; 1977 Pacific typhoon season; 1977 North Indian Ocean cyclone season

The 1977 Atlantic hurricane season was a very inactive Atlantic hurricane season, with only six named storms. The season officially began on June 1, 1977, and lasted until November 30, 1977. These dates conventionally delimit the period of each year when most tropical cyclogenesis occurs in the Atlantic basin. The first tropical cyclone of the season developed over the western Caribbean Sea on June 13, 12 days after the start of the season. Three more organized during July and early August. Then, on August 29, the first named storm, Hurricane Anita formed and rapidly intensified to a Category 5 hurricane on the Saffir–Simpson hurricane wind scale on September 1, before striking Mexico, bringing strong winds and heavy rainfall, causing 11 fatalities and leaving at least 25,000 people homeless.

In addition to Anita, another notable tropical cyclone of this season was Hurricane Babe. The storm caused coastal flooding in southeastern Louisiana, resulting in $13 million (1977 USD) in damage. (Note: All damage figures are in 1977 USD, unless otherwise noted) After moving inland, it spawned 14 tornadoes throughout Alabama, Louisiana, Mississippi, and South Carolina. In addition to Anita and Babe, five other tropical cyclones – hurricanes Clara, Dorothy, and Evelyn, as well as Tropical Storm Frieda and Tropical Depression Nine – left only minor impacts on land. Overall, the tropical cyclones of the season collectively caused 11 fatalities and more than $13 million in damage, excluding the remnants of Tropical Depression Nine, which led to 53 deaths and $203 million in losses due to flooding in the Southeastern United States, New Jersey, and New York.

== Season summary ==
The Atlantic hurricane season officially began on June 1, 1977. Activity began several days later with the formation of a tropical depression on June 13. Although 16 tropical depressions formed, it was a below-average season because only six strengthened into tropical storms. In terms of named storms, this was the least active season since 1965. Five of these attained hurricane status, and one of the five eventually attained major hurricane status, which is Category 3 or higher on the Saffir–Simpson hurricane wind scale. The inactivity was attributed to an El Niño that began developing in August. Three hurricanes and one tropical storm made landfall during the season, causing 11 deaths and $13 million in damage. The last storm of the season, Tropical Depression Nine, dissipated on November 7, over three weeks before the official end of the season on November 30.

Tropical cyclogenesis in the 1977 Atlantic hurricane season began with the development of a tropical depression on June 13. Activity briefly halted until two other tropical depressions developed in the second half of July. A fourth tropical depression formed in early August. Later that month, Hurricane Anita developed on August 29. It was the latest in the season for a first named storm to form in the satellite era. September, the climatological peak of hurricane season, was its most active month. Five tropical cyclones developed, including two tropical depressions, and hurricanes Babe, Clara, and Dorothy. There were also five tropical cyclones in October – three tropical depressions, Hurricane Evelyn, and Tropical Storm Frieda. The final tropical cyclone of the season, Tropical Depression Nine, developed between the Greater Antilles and Bermuda on November 3 and dissipated by November 7.

The season's activity was reflected with a cumulative accumulated cyclone energy (ACE) rating of 25, which was the lowest ACE value since 1946. ACE is a metric used to express the energy used by a tropical cyclone during its lifetime. Therefore, a storm with a longer duration will have high values of ACE. It is only calculated at six-hour increments in which specific tropical and subtropical systems are either at or above sustained wind speeds of 39 mph (63 km/h), which is the threshold for tropical storm intensity.

== Systems ==
=== Hurricane Anita ===
- Category 5 hurricane (SSHWS)
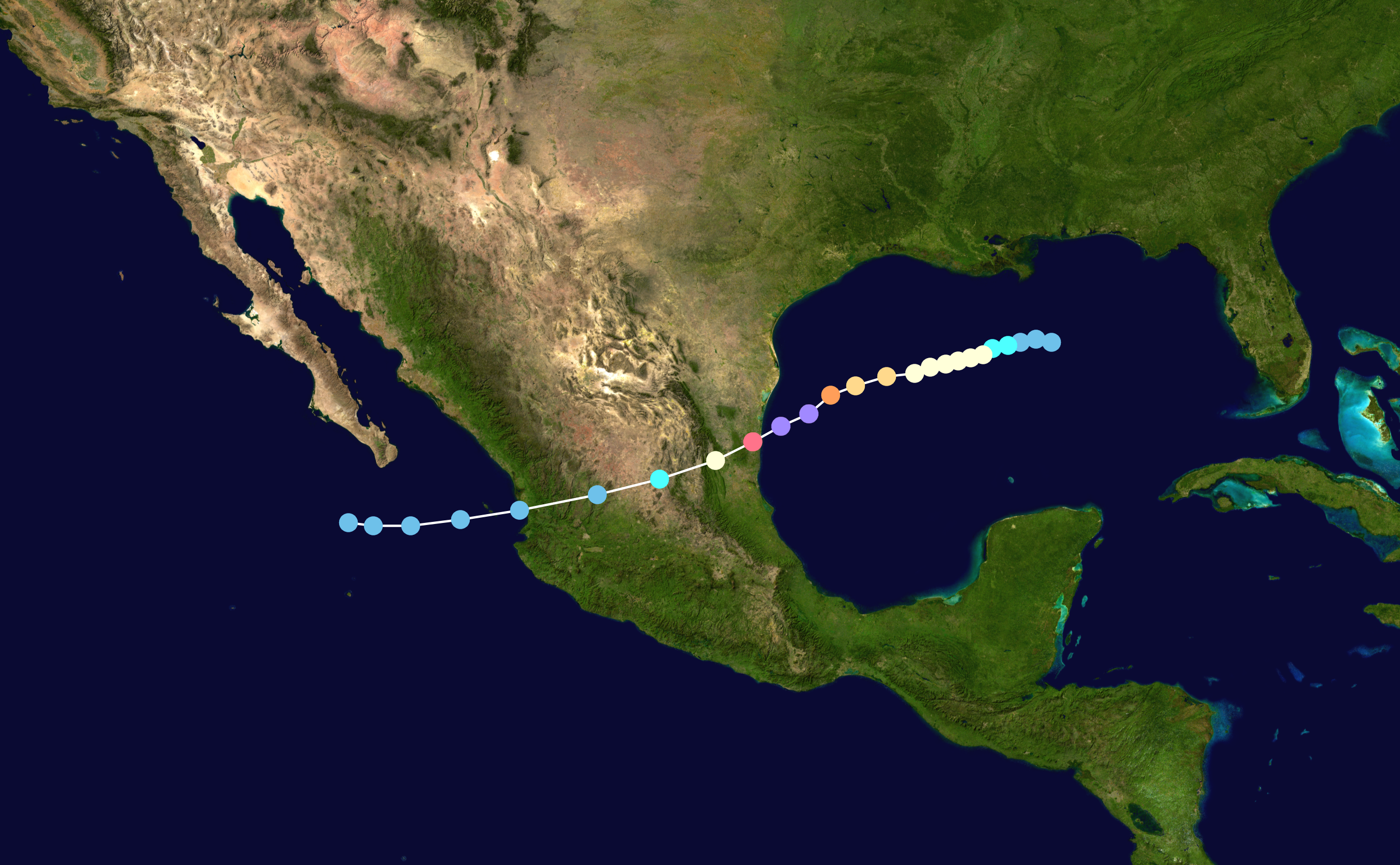
- Duration: August 29 – September 3
- Peak intensity: 175 mph (280 km/h) (1-min); 926 mbar (hPa)

A tropical wave spawned a tropical depression at 1200 UTC on August 29, while located about 230 miles (370 km) south-southwest of New Orleans, Louisiana. The depression moved west-southwestward and strengthened into Tropical Storm Anita early on August 30. Later that day, the storm had intensified into a hurricane. Although intensification briefly slowed, rapid deepening occurred from September 1 to the following day, when Anita peaked as a Category 5 hurricane with winds of 175 mph (280 km/h). The storm maintained its intensity before making landfall near Soto la Marina, Tamaulipas. It rapidly weakened inland, decreasing to tropical depression intensity early on September 3. However, Anita remained intact across Mexico and reached the eastern Pacific Ocean as a depression.

Prior to becoming a tropical cyclone, the precursor to Anita dropped light rainfall in Florida. Gusty winds and storm surge effected Louisiana. At Grand Isle, storm tides 2 feet (0.61 m) above normal resulted in hundreds of families being asked to evacuate. Numerous coastal highways in Texas, including portions of State Highway 87, were closed due to above normal tides. Precipitation reached 4.97 inches (126 mm) in Rio Grande City. In Mexico, the hurricane caused strong winds and moderate rainfall. The winds caused extensive damage to villages in northeastern Mexico, with about 25,000 people left homeless. The roofs of most buildings were destroyed near the location of Anita's landfall. The highest amount of precipitation observed during the storm was 15.2 inches (390 mm) at Soto la Marina, Tamaulipas. Flooding and mudslides killed eleven people in the state. Overall damage is unknown.

=== Hurricane Babe ===
- Category 1 hurricane (SSHWS)
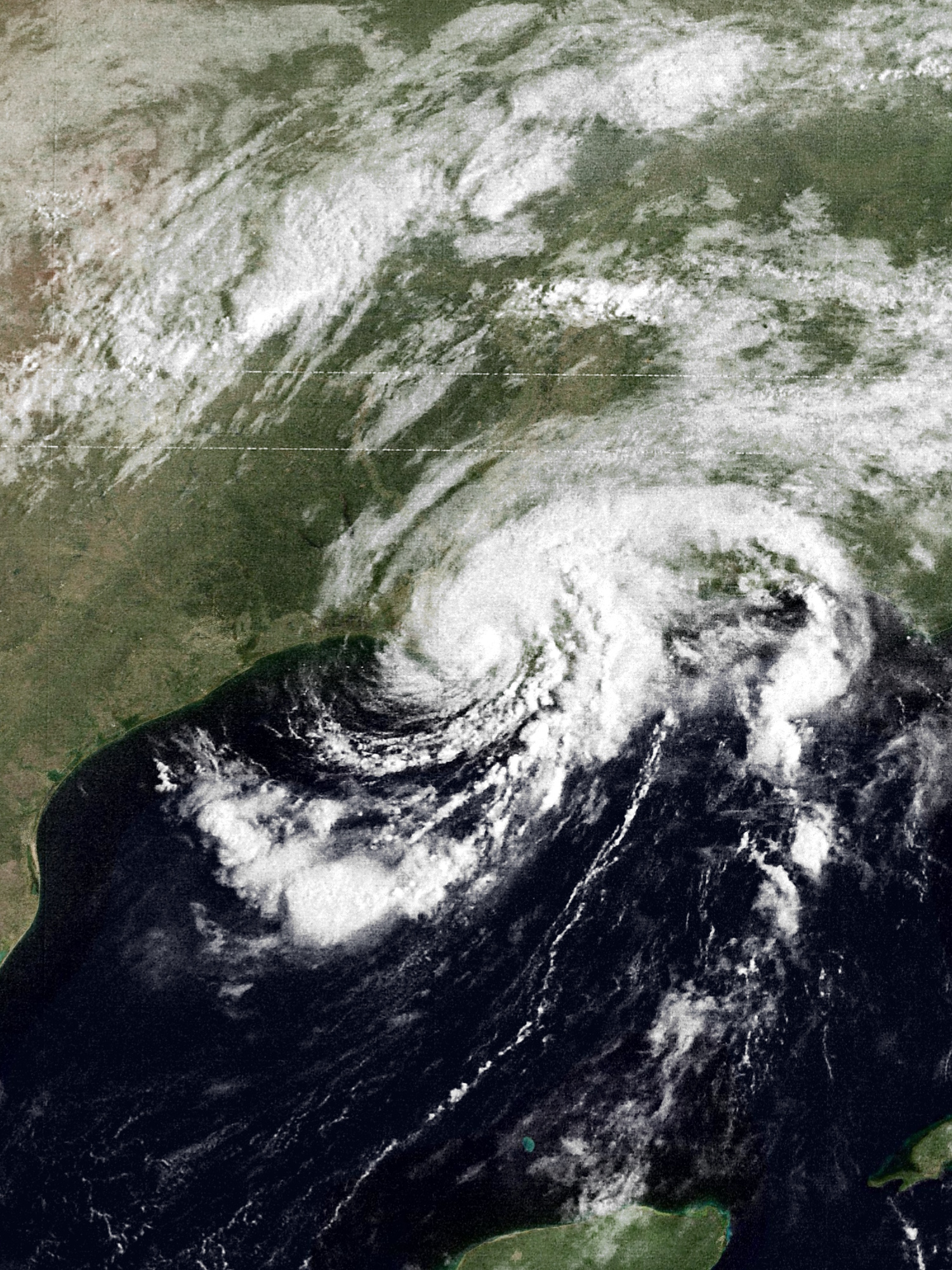
- Duration: September 3 – September 9
- Peak intensity: 75 mph (120 km/h) (1-min); 995 mbar (hPa)

The interaction of a tropical wave and a cold upper low pressure area developed into a subtropical depression in the eastern Gulf of Mexico on September 3. It strengthened while gradually acquiring tropical characteristics and was reclassified as Tropical Storm Babe late on September 4. The storm curved north-northeastward and by early on the following day, it was upgraded to a hurricane. Around that time, Babe peaked with maximum sustained winds of 75 mph (120 km/h). Early on September 5, Babe made landfall near Cocodrie, Louisiana at the same intensity. Later that day, it weakened to a tropical storm and then a tropical depression on September 6. However, Babe continued to move northeastward and then east-northeastward across the Southeastern United States until dissipating early on September 9.

Babe produced light to moderate rainfall across much of the Southern United States. In Louisiana, precipitation peaked at 10.99 inches (279 mm) near Lafayette. Flooding damage was primarily to crops, mainly sugar cane. Six tornadoes were spawned in Louisiana, including one near Hammond that severely damage a country store and knocked six wood-frame homes off their foundations. Damage from this tornado alone reached $2.5 million. In other states, Babe brought flash flooding along its path due to rainfall exceeding 7 inches (180 mm) in Mississippi, northwestern Georgia, and western North Carolina. Overall, Babe caused about $13 million in damage, but no deaths.

=== Hurricane Clara ===
- Category 1 hurricane (SSHWS)
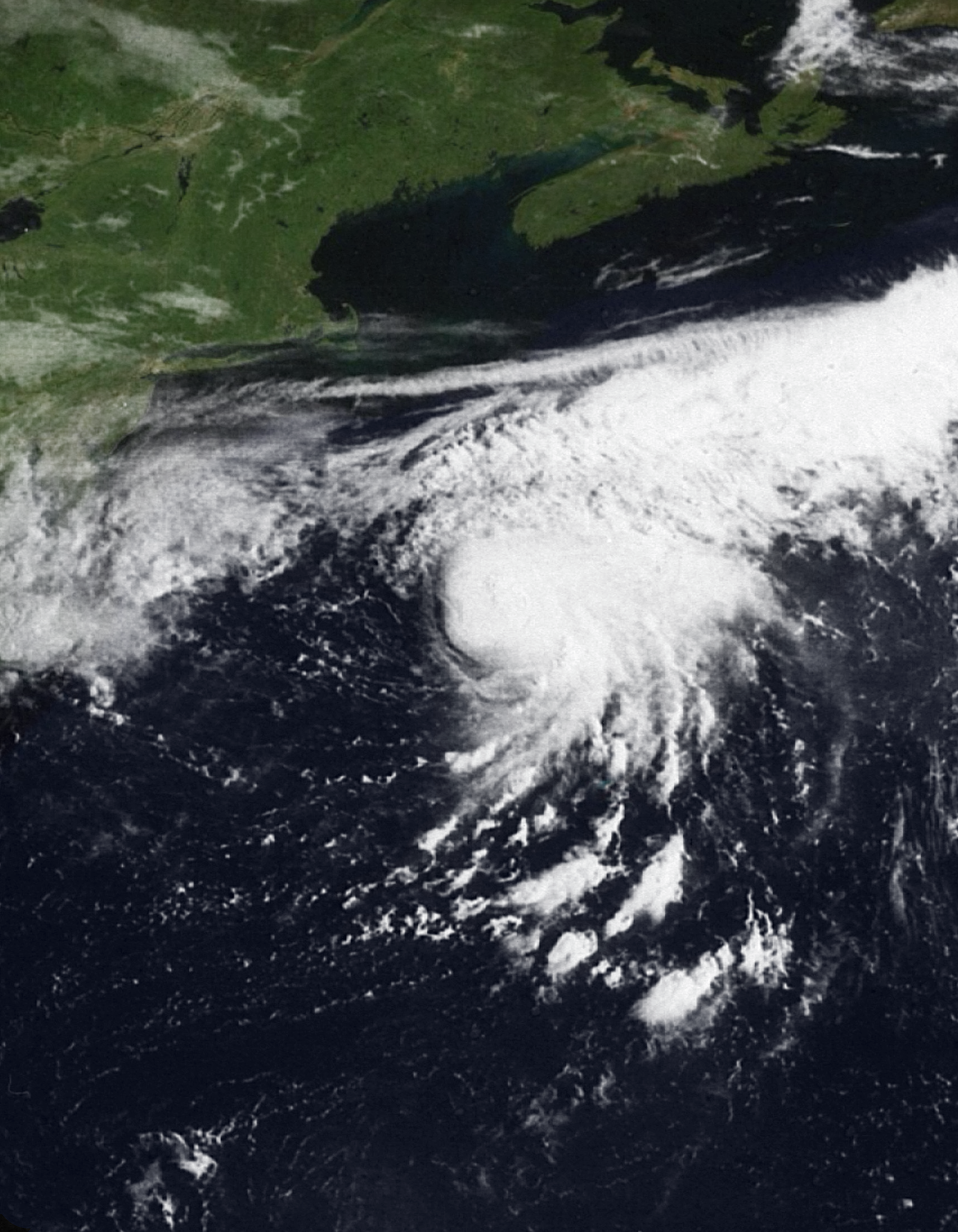
- Duration: September 5 – September 11
- Peak intensity: 75 mph (120 km/h) (1-min); 993 mbar (hPa)

A convective cloud mass with a spiral band of gale-force winds, associated with the development of Hurricane Babe, moved across the Southeastern United States in early September. The system developed a circulation by late on September 4, while tracking across southeastern Georgia. After a slight drop in barometric pressure and an increase in wind speeds, a tropical depression formed inland near Charleston, South Carolina at 1200 UTC on September 5. The depression initially drifted east-northeastward and soon moved offshore. After passing south of Cape Hatteras, North Carolina on September 6, it began to organize while accelerating just north of due east. At 0000 UTC on September 8, the depression intensified into Tropical Storm Clara. The storm quickly strengthened, becoming a hurricane only 12 hours later. Strong wind shear caused Clara to weaken back to a tropical storm on September 9. Thereafter, the storm executed a cyclonic loop near Bermuda. By late on September 10, Clara accelerated northeastward and became extratropical at 1200 UTC on September 11.

In its early stages, the storm dropped light rainfall in the Southeastern United States, peaking at 3.53 inches (90 mm) in Beaufort, South Carolina. Additionally, Clara produced 0.55 inches (14 mm) of precipitation in Bermuda. The remnants reached Canada and produced winds of 62 mph (100 km/h) in Antigonish, Nova Scotia, which knocked over campers, uprooted trees, damaged barns, and caused power outages in the area.

=== Hurricane Dorothy ===
- Category 1 hurricane (SSHWS)
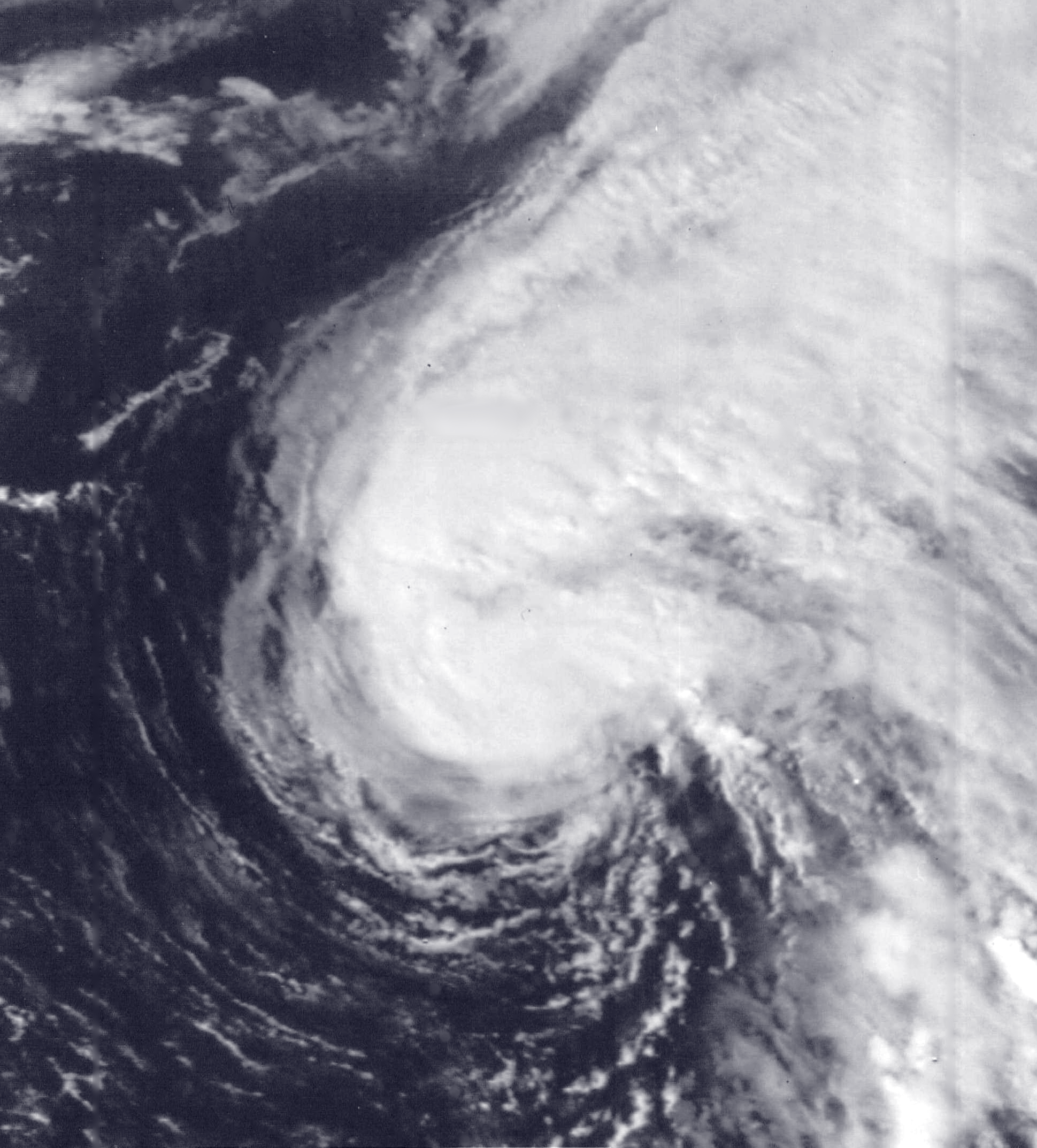
- Duration: September 26 – September 29
- Peak intensity: 85 mph (140 km/h) (1-min); 980 mbar (hPa)

A tropical wave emerged into the Atlantic Ocean from the west coast of Africa on September 15. The system tracked westward at 17 to 23 mph (27 to 37 km/h) and convection began organizing five days later. On September 21, the wave crossed the Windward Islands, bringing wind gusts of 69 mph (111 km/h) to Guadeloupe and Martinique and rainfall of 5 to 8 inches (130 to 200 mm) on several islands. Although it was a strong tropical wave, the system weakened significantly while crossing Hispaniola on September 23. Tracking steadily northward, it developed into a tropical depression northeast of the Bahamas on September 26. A reconnaissance aircraft indicated that the depression strengthened into Tropical Storm Dorothy at 1200 UTC on September 27.

Shortly after becoming a tropical storm, Dorothy passed just south of Bermuda, though no damage was reported on the island. The storm quickly strengthened while tracking northeastward and strengthened into a hurricane at 1200 UTC on September 28. By early on September 29, Dorothy attained its peak intensity with maximum sustained winds of 85 mph (140 km/h) and a minimum barometric pressure of 980 mbar (29 inHg). Later that day, Dorothy transitioned into an extratropical storm while located south of Cape Race, Newfoundland. On September 30, the extratropical remnants of Dorothy were absorbed by a frontal low pressure system located in the northern Atlantic Ocean.

=== Hurricane Evelyn ===
- Category 1 hurricane (SSHWS)
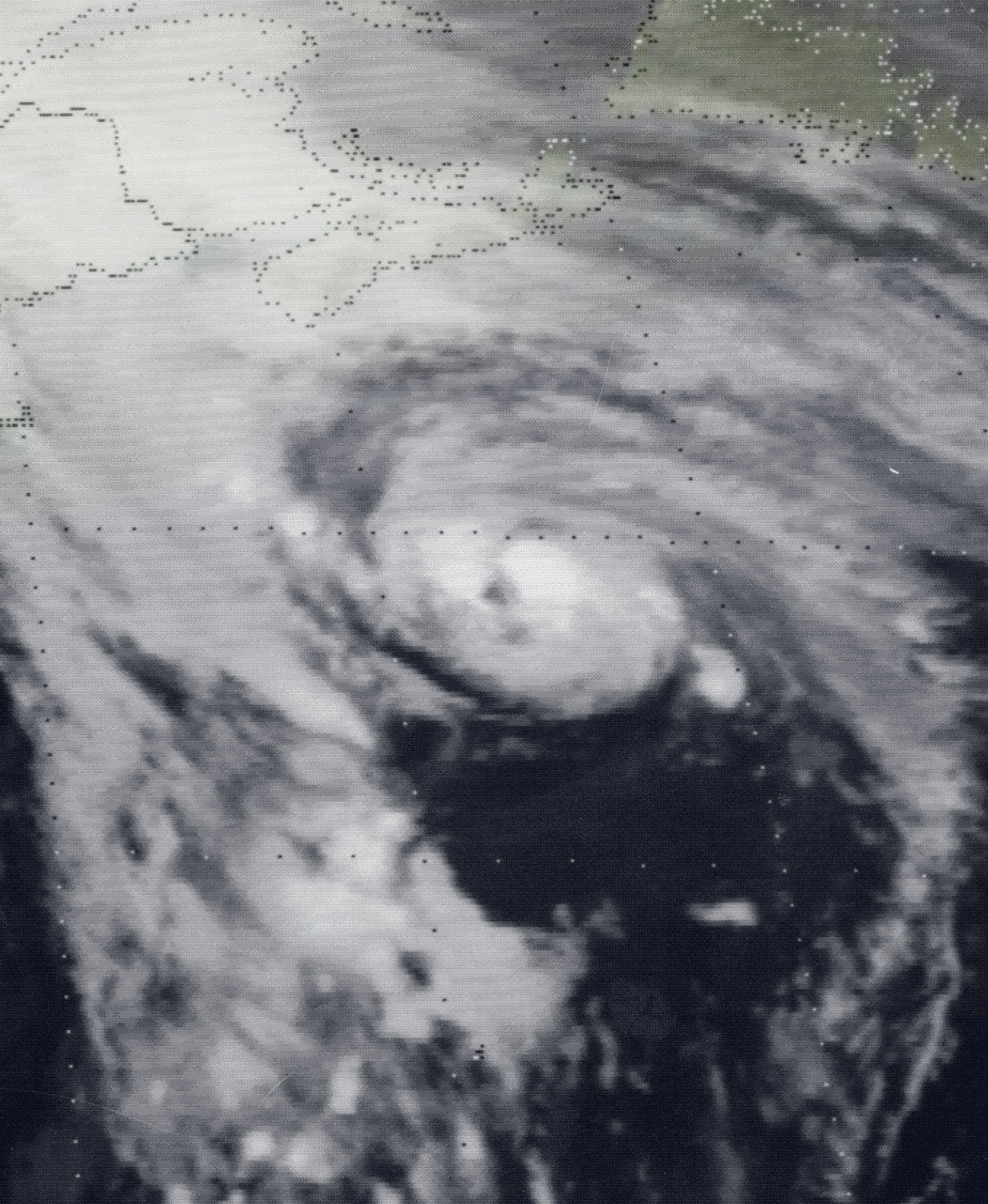
- Duration: October 13 – October 15
- Peak intensity: 80 mph (130 km/h) (1-min); 994 mbar (hPa)

A tropical wave emerged into the Atlantic Ocean from the west coast of Africa on October 3. The system tracked westward at an abnormally low altitude of 6°N. However, because the Azores high pressure was abnormally weak, the system quickly curved northwestward. After a significant increase in convection, a tropical depression developed at 1800 UTC on October 13, while located 400 miles (640 km) south of Bermuda. A ship later reported gale-force winds, prompting an upgrade of the depression to Tropical Storm Evelyn on October 14. Early on the following day, a reconnaissance flight recorded winds of 83 mph (134 km/h), indicating that Evelyn became a hurricane. Later on October 15, accelerated to the north-northeast and made landfall on Cape Breton Island, Nova Scotia with winds of 80 mph (130 km/h) at 1200 UTC. Shortly after entering the Gulf of Saint Lawrence, Evelyn merged with a cold front at 1800 UTC on October 15, near the tip of southeastern Newfoundland.

Impact on Bermuda was limited to light winds and a small amount of rainfall – 2.60 inches (66 mm). On Sable Island, Evelyn produced tropical storm force winds, reaching 52 mph (84 km/h). In both Nova Scotia and Newfoundland, the storm dropped light rainfall, rarely exceeding 1 inch (25 mm). Some areas of Newfoundland experienced tropical storm force winds, mainly between Stephenville and St. John's. However, this may have been in combination with the cold front that Evelyn merged with. In addition, a ship near the southwestern tip of Newfoundland reported sustained winds of 78 mph (126 km/h).

=== Tropical Storm Frieda ===
- Tropical storm (SSHWS)
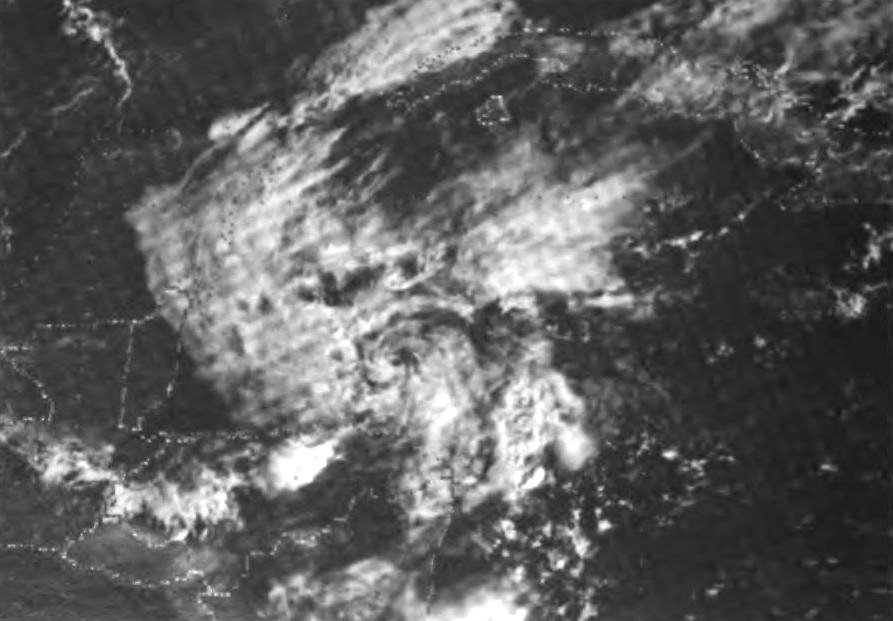
- Duration: October 16 – October 19
- Peak intensity: 60 mph (95 km/h) (1-min); 1005 mbar (hPa)

A tropical wave emerged into the Atlantic Ocean from the west coast of Africa on October 4. The wave tracked uneventfully westward for about 10 days. On October 12, the remnants of a cold front reached the northwestern Caribbean Sea. The wave began interacting with it and another cold front that entered the region by October 16. Later that day, a reconnaissance aircraft reported a surface circulation near Swan Island, Honduras. Thus, a tropical depression developed at 1800 UTC on October 16. The depression moved slowly westward and strengthened into Tropical Storm Frieda on October 17, while passing south of Swan Island.

Frieda continued to intensify until peaking with winds of 60 mph (95 km/h) and a minimum barometric pressure of 1,005 mbar (29.7 inHg) early on October 18. Later that day, Frieda weakened and fell to tropical depression intensity. At 0000 UTC on October 19, the storm made landfall near Belize City, Belize as a weak tropical depression. Frieda promptly dissipated. Belize City reported only minimal rainfall and light winds. Around that time, the storm passed south of Swan Island, where it produced 4.46 inches (113 mm) in a 30‑hour period. On Grand Cayman, 5.42 inches (138 mm) of precipitation fell in 36 hours.

=== Other systems ===
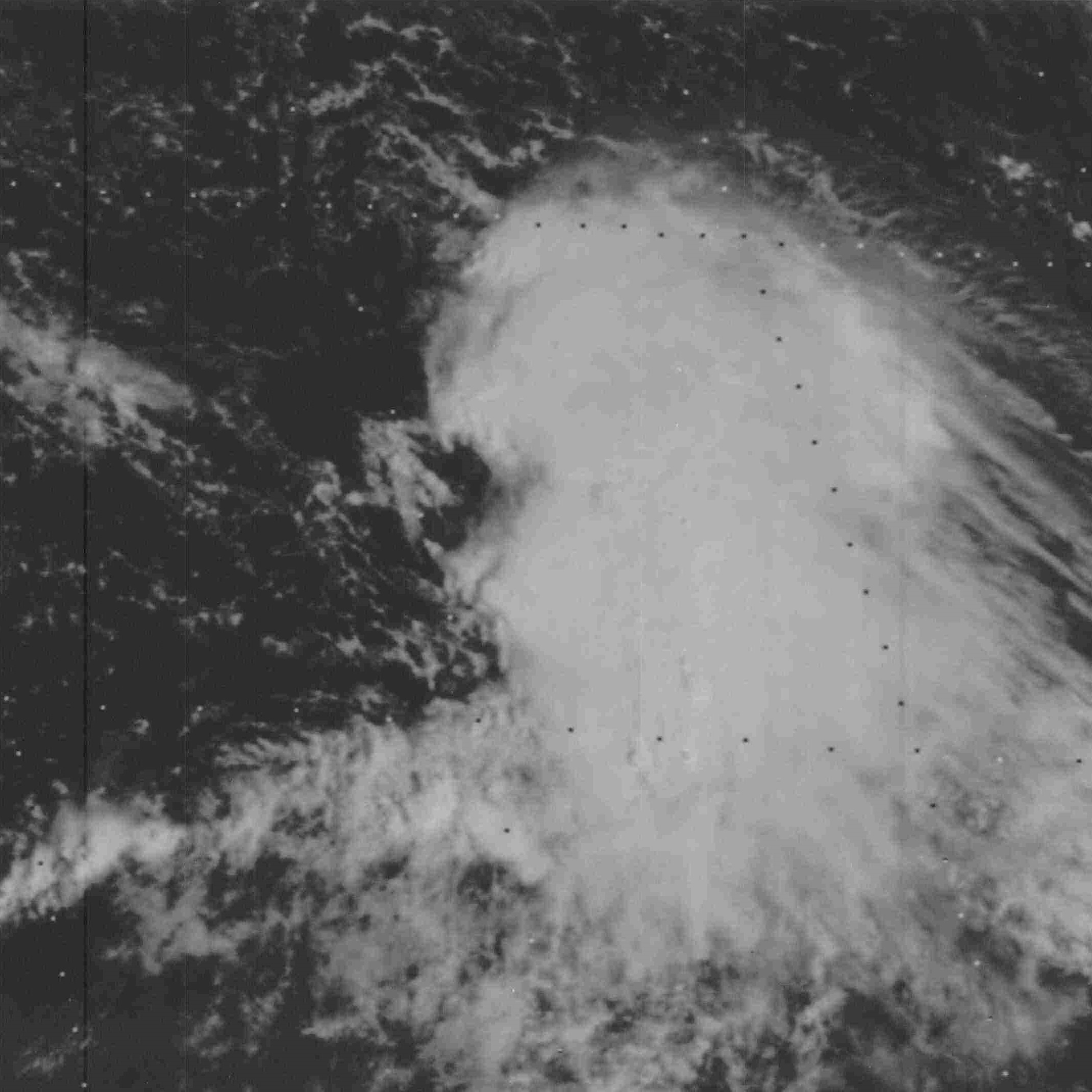
Tropical Depression Six in the central Atlantic on October 2.

In addition to the six named storms and Tropical Depression Nine, a total of nine other tropical depressions developed during the season. Later in June, a tropical depression formed in the west-central Gulf of Mexico on June 13. It headed north-northwestward and made landfall in Texas by the following day. The system rapidly dissipated after moving inland. The third tropical depression of the season developed in the central Gulf of Mexico on July 17. After tracking northward, the depression struck near Mobile, Alabama on July 18. By the following day, it dissipated in central Mississippi. In late July, another depression developed in the central Gulf of Mexico on July 25. No further strengthening occurred and by the following day, it dissipated north of the Yucatán Peninsula.

A tropical depression developed near the west coast of Africa on August 1. The system tracked westward for three days without intensifying and dissipated on August 4. The next tropical depression formed well west-southwest of Cape Verde on September 17. After remaining disorganized, it dissipated to the east-southeast of the Lesser Antilles about three days later. Tropical Depression Four developed in the Bay of Campeche on September 22. However, the depression remained weak and made landfall near Tampico, Tamaulipas at around 1000 UTC on September 23. Later that day, it dissipated while barely inland.

By October 1, another tropical depression formed east of the Lesser Antilles. It headed west-northwestward and dissipated on October 3, before reaching the Windward Islands. Tropical Depression Six developed in the central Atlantic Ocean on October 2. It briefly headed east-southeastward, before curving northwestward on October 4. The system dissipated later that day. Another tropical depression developed in the Gulf of Mexico east of the Texas and Mexico border on October 24. It tracked northeastward without intensification and made landfall in southeast Louisiana on October 25, while still a tropical depression. The system quickly weakened and dissipated over southern Mississippi later that day.

A system operationally known as Tropical Depression Nine was tracked from November 3 to 7 in the western Atlantic, however it was later removed fom the Atlantic HURDAT database. Flooding associated with the system caused $203 million USD in damage and 53 deaths in the eastern United States.

== Storm names ==
The following list of names was used for named storms that formed in the North Atlantic in 1977. Storms were named Anita, Babe, Clara and Evelyn for the first (and only, in the case of Anita) time this season.

- Anita
- Babe
- Clara
- Dorothy
- Evelyn
- Frieda
- Grace (unused)
- Hannah (unused)
- Ida (unused)
- Jodie (unused)
- Kristina (unused)
- Lois (unused)
- Mary (unused)
- Nora (unused)
- Odel (unused)
- Penny (unused)
- Raquel (unused)
- Sophia (unused)
- Trudy (unused)
- Virginia (unused)
- Willene (unused)

=== Retirement ===
The name Anita was later retired on account of the extensive damage it caused. It will never be used again for an Atlantic tropical cyclone.

== Season effects ==
This is a table of all of the storms that formed in the 1977 Atlantic hurricane season. It includes their name, duration, peak classification and intensities, areas affected, damage, and death totals. Deaths in parentheses are additional and indirect (an example of an indirect death would be a traffic accident), but were still related to that storm. Damage and deaths include totals while the storm was extratropical, a wave, or a low, and all of the damage figures are in 1977 USD.

Saffir–Simpson scale
TD	TS	C1	C2	C3	C4	C5

1977 North Atlantic tropical cyclone season statistics
Storm name	Dates active	Storm category at peak intensity	Max 1-min wind mph (km/h)	Min. press. (mbar)	Areas affected	Damage (US$)	Deaths	Ref(s).
Unnumbered	June 13 – June 14	Tropical depression	30 (45)	Unknown	Texas	None	None	
Unnumbered	July 18 – July 19	Tropical depression	35 (55)	Unknown	Alabama	None	None	
Unnumbered	July 25 – July 26	Tropical depression	30 (45)	Unknown	None	None	None	
Unnumbered	August 1 – August 4	Tropical depression	35 (55)	Unknown	None	None	None	
Anita	August 29 – September 3	Category 5 hurricane	175 (280)	926	Northeastern Mexico	Unknown	11	
Babe	September 3 – 9	Category 1 hurricane	75 (120)	995	Southern United States	$13 million	None	
Clara	September 5 – September 11	Category 1 hurricane	75 (120)	993	The Carolinas, Nova Scotia	Minimal	None	
Unnumbered	September 17 – September 19	Tropical depression	30 (45)	Unknown	None	None	None	
Unnumbered	September 22 – September 23	Tropical depression	30 (45)	Unknown	northern Mexico	None	None	
Dorothy	September 26 – 29	Category 1 hurricane	85 (140)	980	Bermuda, Newfoundland	None	None	
Unnumbered	October 1 – October 3	Tropical depression	35 (55)	Unknown	Windward Islands	None	None	
Unnumbered	October 3 – October 5	Tropical depression	35 (55)	Unknown	None	None	None	
Evelyn	October 13 – 15	Category 1 hurricane	80 (130)	994	Bermuda, Nova Scotia, Newfoundland	None	None	
Frieda	October 16 – 19	Tropical storm	60 (95)	1005	Cayman Islands, Belize	None	None	
Unnumbered	October 24 – October 25	Tropical depression	35 (55)	Unknown	Louisiana	None	None	=
Season aggregates
15 systems	June 13 – October 25		175 (280)	926		>$216 million	64	

== See also ==
- 1977 Pacific hurricane season
- 1977 Pacific typhoon season
- 1977 North Indian Ocean cyclone season
- Australian cyclone seasons: 1976–77, 1977–78
- South Pacific cyclone seasons: 1976–77, 1977–78
- South-West Indian Ocean cyclone seasons: 1976–77, 1977–78
- South Atlantic tropical cyclone
- Mediterranean tropical-like cyclone
