= List of storms named Anita =

The name Anita has been used for thirteen tropical cyclones worldwide: one in the North Atlantic Ocean, one in the South Atlantic Ocean, two in the South-West Indian Ocean, and nine in the Western Pacific Ocean. The name Anita was retired in the North Atlantic after the 1977 hurricane season.

In the North Atlantic:

- Hurricane Anita (1977), Category 5 hurricane that made a powerful landfall in northern Mexico

The name Anita was retired from use in the North Atlantic after the 1977 hurricane season.

In the South Atlantic:

- Tropical Storm Anita (2010), the third known tropical cyclone in the south Atlantic on record; did not make landfall, but brought gusty winds to Brazil

In the South-West Indian:

- Tropical Storm Anita (1967)
- Tropical Storm Anita (2006), passed between Madagascar and the African continent, but did not make landfall

In the Western Pacific:

- Tropical Storm Anita (1950) (T5038)
- Typhoon Anita (1955) (T5504)
- Tropical Depression Anita (1959) (07W), Japan Meteorological Agency analyzed it as a tropical depression, not as a tropical storm
- Tropical Storm Anita (1961) (26W), Japan Meteorological Agency analyzed it as a tropical depression, not as a tropical storm
- Tropical Storm Anita (1964) (T6421, 33W), struck Vietnam
- Typhoon Anita (1967) (T6706, 06W, Gening)
- Super Typhoon Anita (1970) (T7010, 11W), struck Japan
- Typhoon Anita (1973) (T7302, 02W)
- Typhoon Anita (1976) (T7611, 11W, Maring), struck Japan
