= Hurricane Anita =

Category 5 Atlantic and Pacific hurricane in 1977

Hurricane Anita Tropical Depression Eleven
- Anita approaching the Gulf Coast of Mexico on September 2

Meteorological history
- Formed: August 29, 1977
- Dissipated: September 4, 1977

Category 5 major hurricane
- 1-minute sustained (SSHWS/NWS)
- Highest winds: 175 mph (280 km/h)
- Lowest pressure: 926 mbar (hPa); 27.34 inHg

Overall effects
- Fatalities: 11 direct
- Damage: Minor
- Areas affected: Gulf Coast of the United States, Mexico
- IBTrACS
- Part of the 1977 Atlantic and Pacific hurricane seasons

Hurricane Anita was a powerful tropical cyclone during the otherwise quiet 1977 Atlantic hurricane season, and the latest first named storm on record since tropical cyclones were first named in 1950. The first tropical cyclone of the season, Anita developed from a tropical wave on August 29 in the north-central Gulf of Mexico. It tracked westward into an area with conditions favorable for further development, and quickly intensified into a hurricane by late on August 30. Initially, Anita was forecast to strike Texas, though a building ridge turned it to the west-southwest. The hurricane rapidly strengthened to attain peak winds of 175 mph (280 km/h), and on September 2 Anita made landfall in eastern Tamaulipas as a Category 5 hurricane. It quickly weakened as it crossed Mexico, and after briefly redeveloping into a tropical depression in the eastern Pacific Ocean, Anita dissipated on September 4 to the south of the Baja California Peninsula.

The hurricane produced light rainfall and high tides along the Gulf Coast of the United States. Some low-level flooding was reported, but damage was slight. In Mexico, the hurricane caused strong winds and moderate rainfall. The winds caused extensive damage to villages in northeastern Mexico, with about 25,000 people left homeless. The rainfall, reaching over 17.52 inches (445 mm), caused flooding and mudslides which killed eleven people in Tamaulipas.

== Meteorological history ==
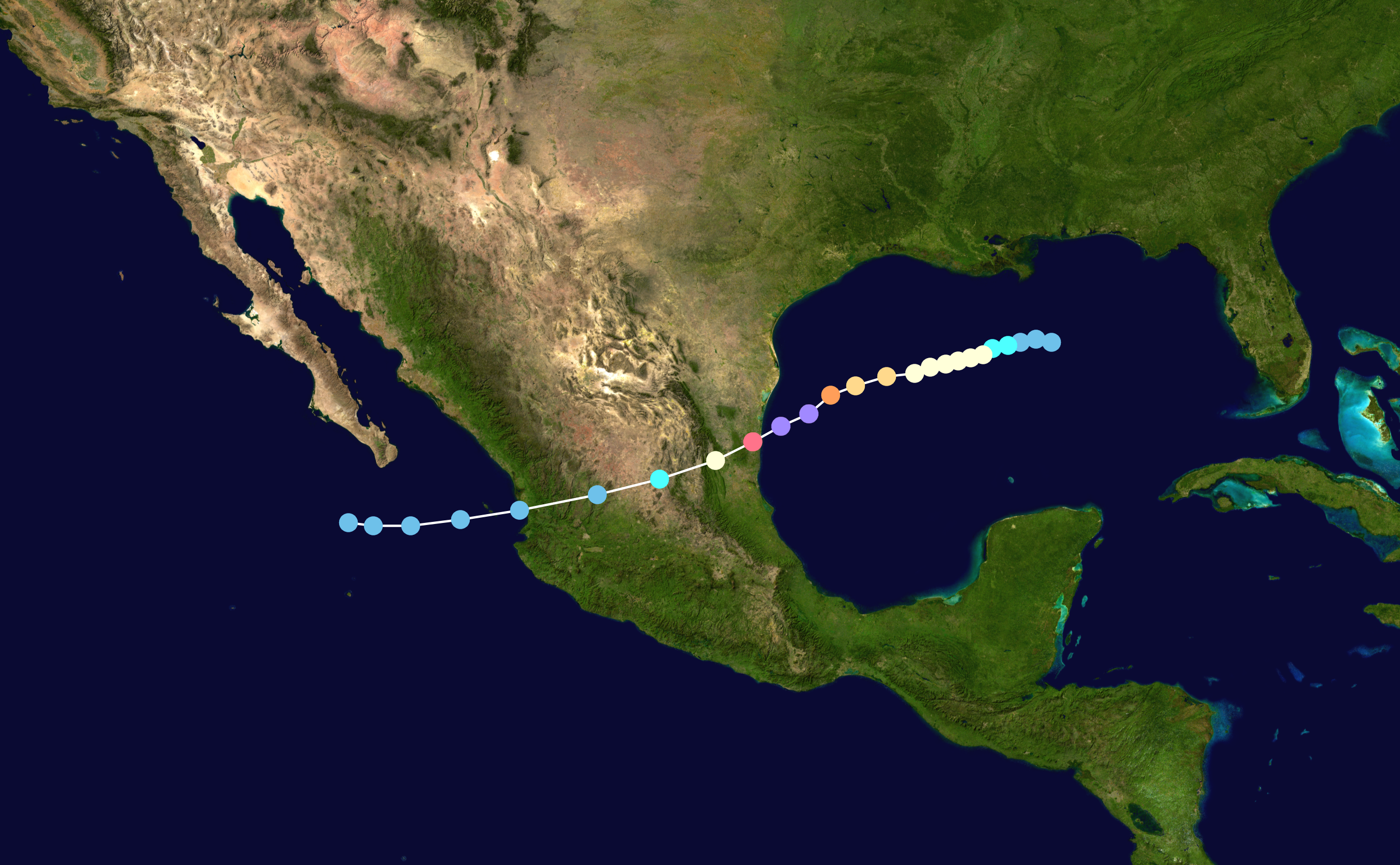
Map plotting the storm's track and intensity, according to the Saffir–Simpson scale Map key Saffir–Simpson scale Tropical depression (≤38 mph, ≤62 km/h) Tropical storm (39–73 mph, 63–118 km/h) Category 1 (74–95 mph, 119–153 km/h) Category 2 (96–110 mph, 154–177 km/h) Category 3 (111–129 mph, 178–208 km/h) Category 4 (130–156 mph, 209–251 km/h) Category 5 (≥157 mph, ≥252 km/h) Unknown Storm type Tropical cyclone Subtropical cyclone Extratropical cyclone, remnant low, tropical disturbance, or monsoon depression

A tropical wave moved off the coast of Africa on August 16. The wave axis tracked steadily westward, and on August 23 convection increased after the wave passed beneath a cold-core upper-level low. By August 27, the wave axis was located over Cuba, with the area of convection located between Florida and the Bahamas after tracking northwestward. The disturbance crossed southern Florida, and after entering the Gulf of Mexico an anticyclone provided favorable conditions for further development. It tracked slowly westward at 5 mph (7 km/h), and after developing a surface circulation the system developed into a tropical depression on August 29 while located about 230 miles (370 km) south-southwest of New Orleans, Louisiana.

With a ridge of high pressure to its north, the depression tracked westward. Favorable conditions persisted for several days prior to the arrival of the depression, and as such the depression quickly intensified into Tropical Storm Anita. The storm tracked slowly over warm water temperatures, and throughout its duration it was embedded within warm, moist tropical air; Anita rapidly organized and attained hurricane status late on August 30; this is the latest date for the first hurricane since 1967. Initially it threatened to strike Texas, though building high pressures to the north of the hurricane turned Anita to the west-southwest. The hurricane developed a well-defined eye, and Anita began to rapidly intensify late on September 1 after attaining major hurricane status. During a two-day period up to its peak intensity, Anita deepened at a rate of 2 mbar per hour, and on September 2 the hurricane reached peak winds of 175 mph (280 km/h) while located just offshore northeastern Mexico, making Anita a Category 5 on the Saffir-Simpson Hurricane Scale.

Hurricane Anita maintained its strength as it approached land, and at 1100 UTC on September 2 it made landfall on Soto la Marina, Tamaulipas, about 145 miles (235 km) south of Brownsville, Texas or 80 miles (130 km) north of Tampico, Mexico. It rapidly weakened over the mountainous terrain of Mexico, and on September 3, about 25 hours after moving ashore, Anita emerged into the eastern Pacific Ocean as a tropical depression. Reclassified as Tropical Depression Eleven, the system continued to the west, and weakened further after encountering cooler water temperatures. The depression gradually lost its deep convection, and on September 4 it dissipated off of the southern tip of the Baja California Peninsula.

== Preparations ==
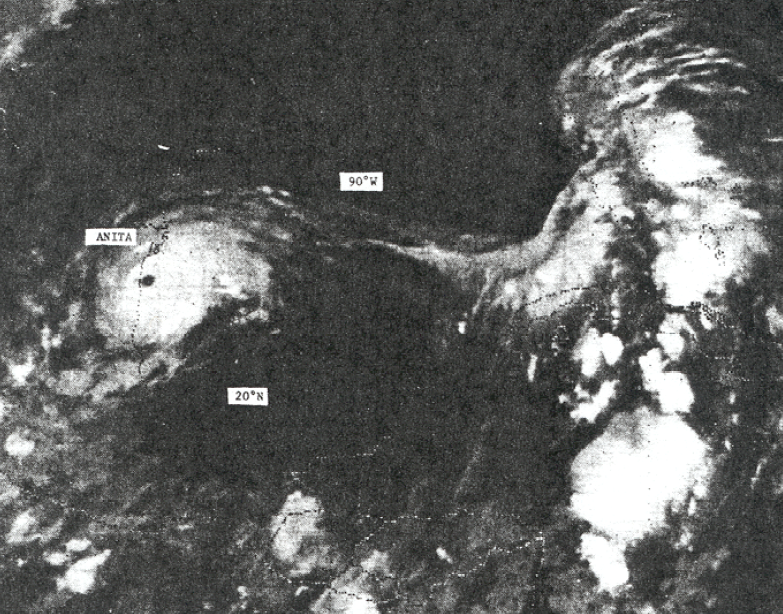
Hurricane Anita near its Mexico landfall

Shortly after first developing, one oil company evacuated its oil rigs off of Texas and Louisiana by helicopter, with several other companies beginning to evacuate unneeded workers. Ultimately, 7,000 oil workers were removed from offshore oil platforms. The threat of the developing disturbance prompted officials to close a state park in southern Louisiana. The National Hurricane Center advised small craft along the northern Gulf Coast to remain at port. Initially, Anita was predicted to continue tracking west-northwestward and make landfall near the Texas/Louisiana border. As a result, schools in Cameron Parish, Louisiana were closed, and on August 30 a hurricane watch was issued for the southwestern Louisiana and northeastern Texas coastlines. After the track shifted further to the south, the watch was replaced with a hurricane warning between Brownsville and just south of Corpus Christi, Texas. An emergency shelter was opened in Brownwood, Texas, and Army trucks were prepared to assist in evacuations. An official from the National Weather Service recommended evacuation for all residents east of Galveston, Texas living in an area below 5 feet (1.5 m) above sea level; about 20,000 left Cameron, Louisiana. In all, about 58,000 people evacuated coastal locations in Louisiana and Texas.

Though the National Hurricane Center did not issue hurricane warnings for Mexico, officials warned the Mexican government of the potential danger of the hurricane. Across the northeastern coastline of the country, 35,000 people evacuated prior to the arrival of the hurricane, including all of the residents in the village where the hurricane struck. The Mexican army assisted in evacuations and preparing emergency shelters.

== Impact ==
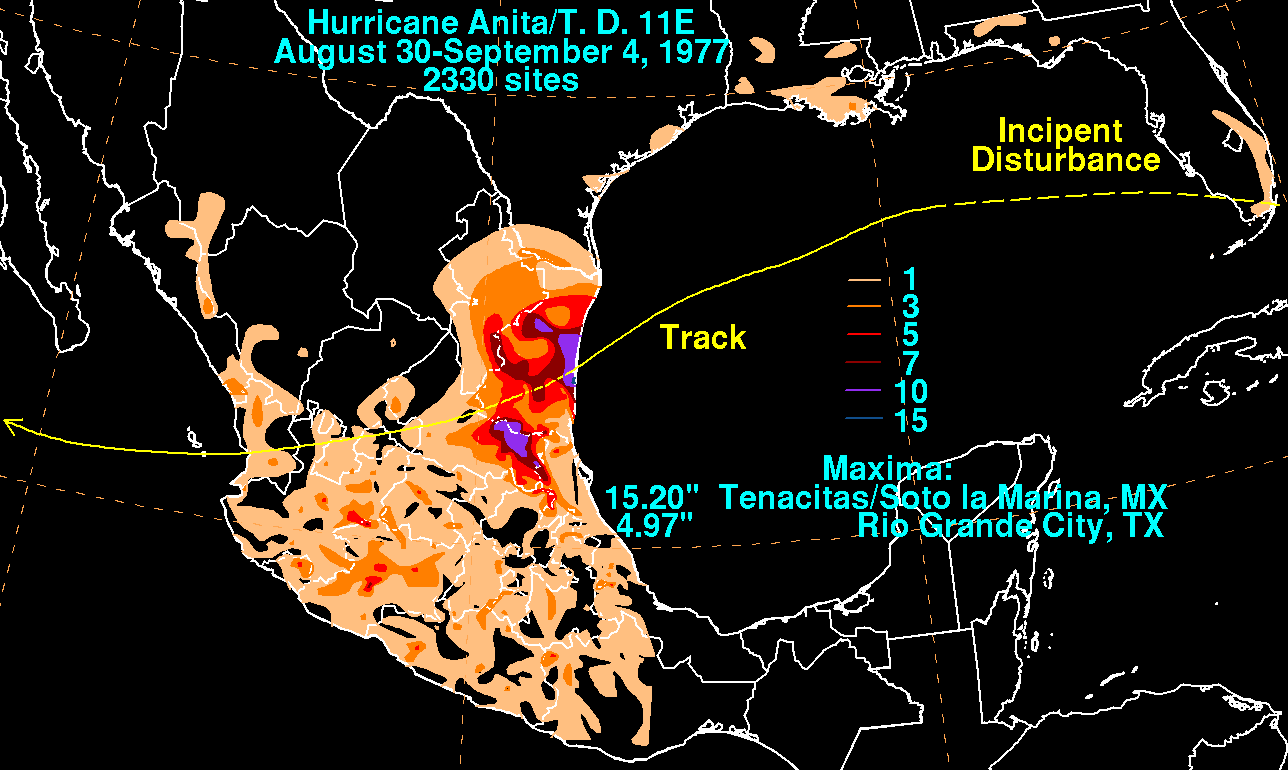
Rainfall Summary for Hurricane Anita

=== United States ===
As the precursor tropical disturbance crossed southern Florida, it dropped rainfall of over 1 inch (25 mm) in the Miami area. Later, as a developing tropical depression, the system produced gusty winds and heavy rainfall in southern Louisiana; one station near Galliano reported over 3 inches (76 mm) of precipitation. Hurricane Anita produced a storm tide of 2 feet (0.6 m) above normal in Grand Isle, which resulted in hundreds of families being asked to leave their homes.

The hurricane produced above-normal tides along the Texas coastline, which closed several highways including Texas State Highway 87. The northern periphery of Hurricane Anita produced light to moderate rainfall across the southern portion of the state, which peaked at 4.97 inches (126 mm) at Rio Grande City. Damage in the state was minor; on South Padre Island damage was limited to a few broken windows.

=== Mexico ===
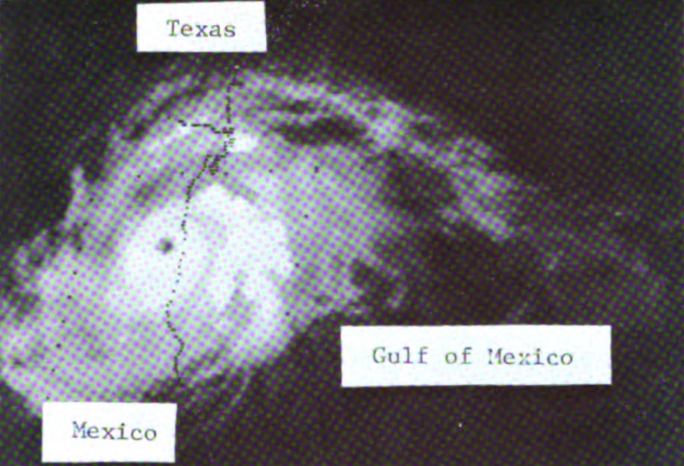
Hurricane Anita just after landfall

Hurricane Anita made landfall in a sparsely populated portion of Mexico; as a result, few meteorological statistics exist. A station near where the hurricane moved ashore recorded 17.52 inches (445 mm) of precipitation in six hours, which resulted in severe flooding and mudslides.

The hurricane caused extensive damage to fishing and farming communities in northeastern Mexico. Strong winds destroyed thousands of homes and left about 25,000 people homeless, according to newspaper reports from Mexico City. The winds destroyed the roofs of most buildings near where the hurricane moved ashore, and also caused widespread power outages which disrupted communications. Heavy rainfall destroyed or obstructed roadways across the region, with some flooded avenues in Tampico and reports of flooded highways near Ciudad Victoria. Eleven people were killed in floods and mudslides across Tamaulipas. In all, at least 50,000 people were affected by the hurricane in Mexico.

== Aftermath ==
Shortly after the hurricane made landfall, the government of Mexico sent two truckloads of food to the areas of greatest impact. Additionally, officials permitted full use of the Mexican railway system to facilitate the distribution of aid. Three municipalities were also declared disaster areas following the storm. In Texas, the combination of moderate rainfall and high tides in low-lying marshland led to a mosquito outbreak near Galveston following the storm.

On account of the severe damage caused by the hurricane in the Atlantic basin, the name Anita was retired at the end of the 1977 season. It will never again be used to name a tropical storm in the basin.

== See also ==
- Other storms of the same name
- List of Category 5 Atlantic hurricanes
- List of Atlantic–Pacific crossover hurricanes
- List of Mexico hurricanes
