= 1967–68 South-West Indian Ocean cyclone season =

Cyclone season in the Southwest Indian Ocean

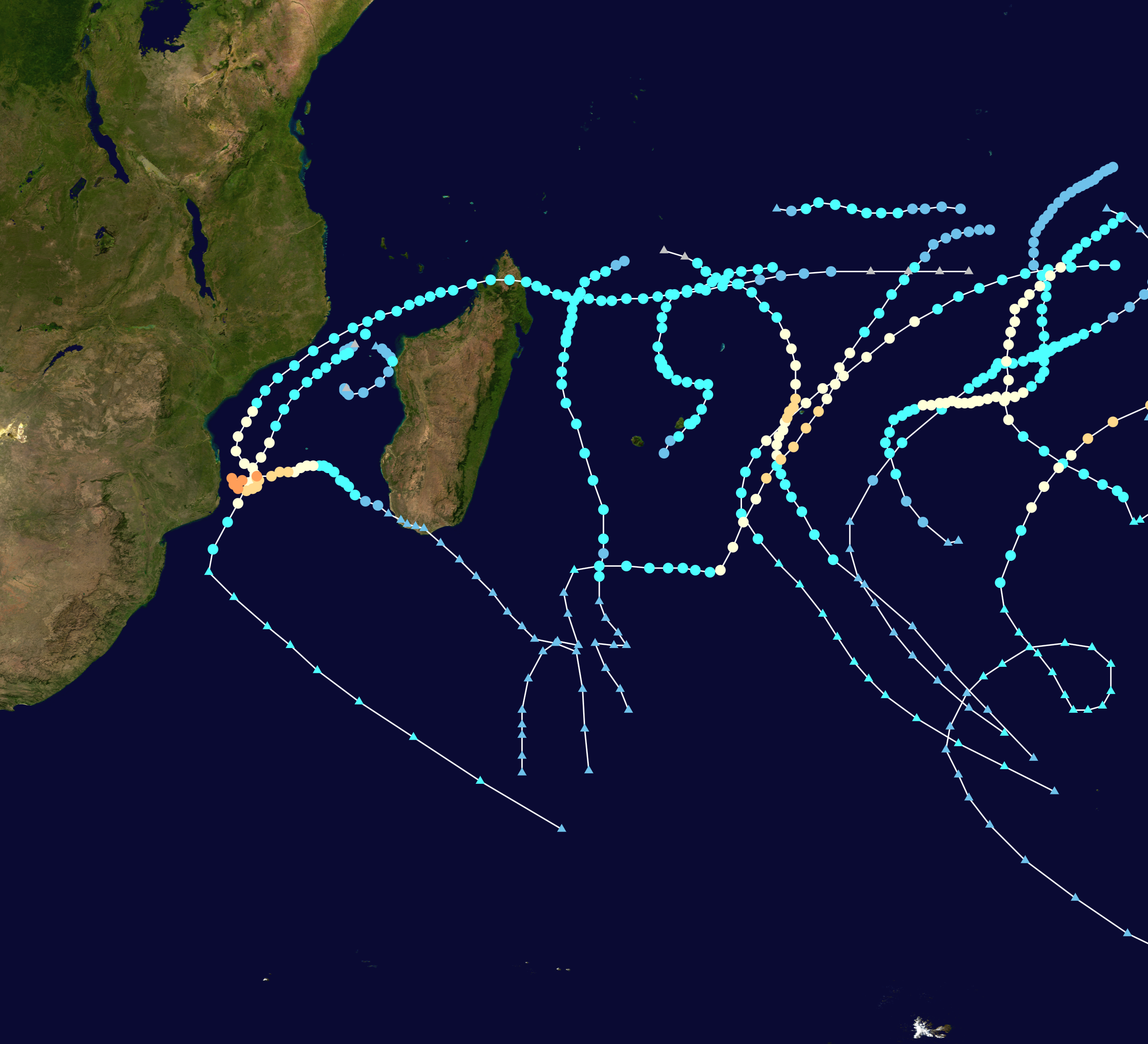
- Season summary map

Seasonal boundaries
- First system formed: December 30, 1967
- Last system dissipated: April 15, 1968

Strongest storm
- Name: Monique
  - Maximum winds: 230 km/h (145 mph) (1-minute sustained)
  - Lowest pressure: 933 hPa (mbar)

Seasonal statistics
- Total depressions: 8
- Total storms: 7
- Tropical cyclones: 4
- Total fatalities: 38
- Total damage: Unknown

Related articles
- 1967–68 Australian region cyclone season; 1967–68 South Pacific cyclone season

The 1967–68 South-West Indian Ocean cyclone season was an above average cyclone season.

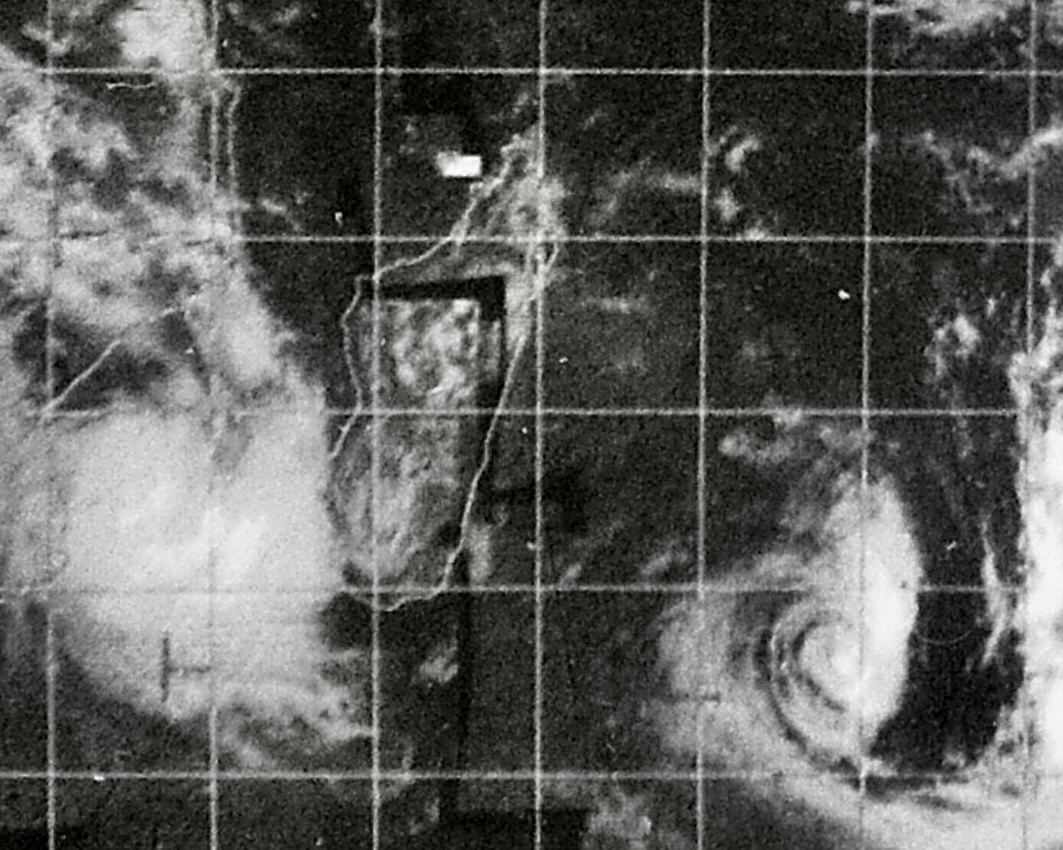
Cyclones Georgette and Henriette simultaneously active on January 22.

== Systems ==
=== Moderate Tropical Storm Anita ===
- Moderate tropical storm (MFR)
- Tropical storm (SSHWS)
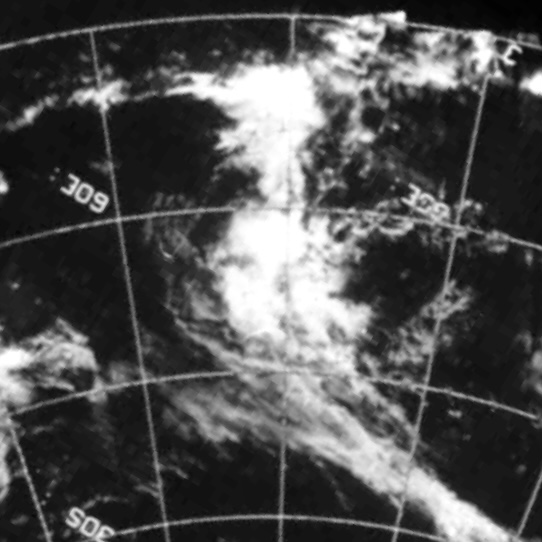
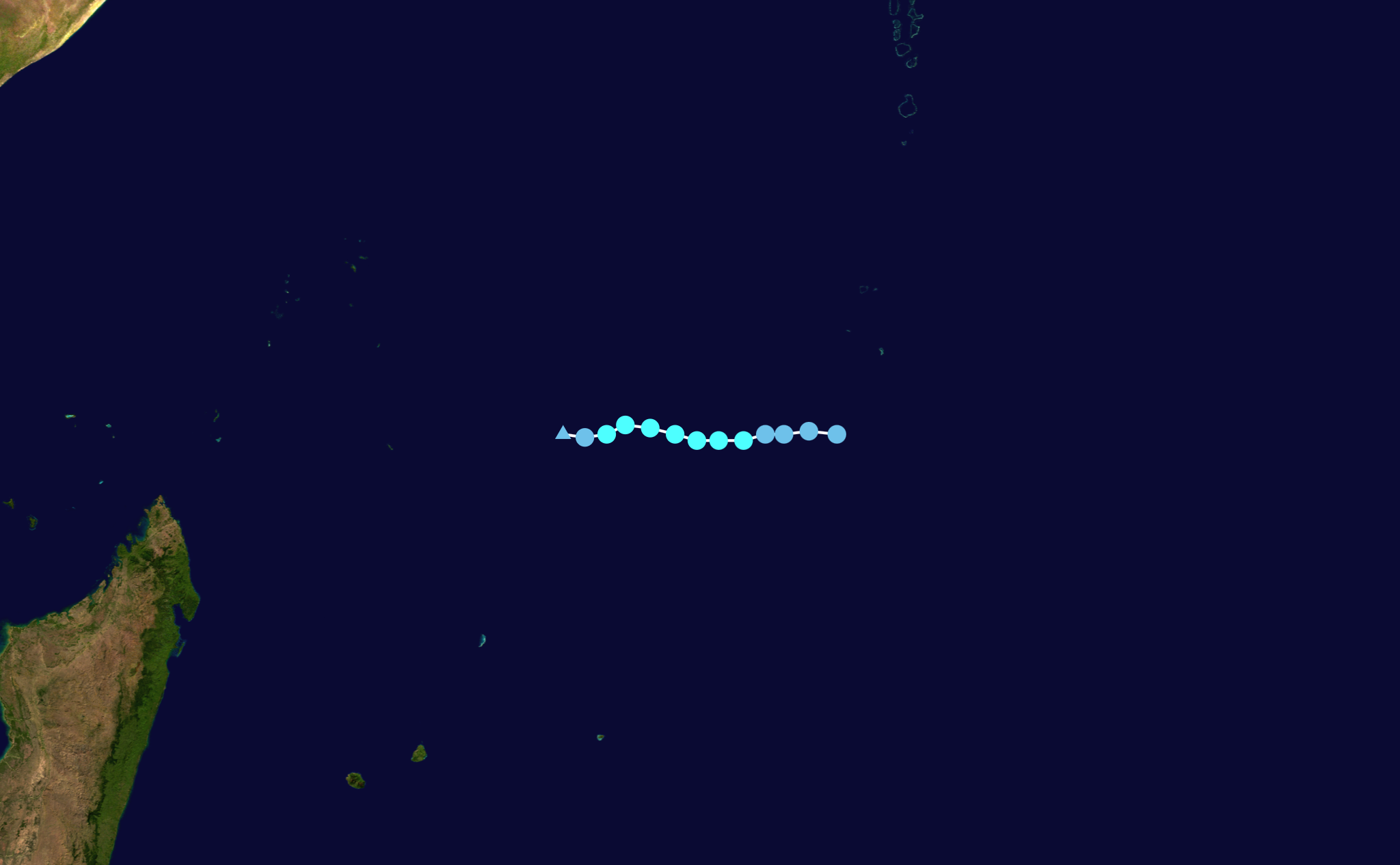
- Duration: October 30 – November 2
- Peak intensity: 65 km/h (40 mph) (10-min);

=== Tropical Cyclone Belinda ===
- Tropical cyclone (MFR)
- Category 1 tropical cyclone (SSHWS)
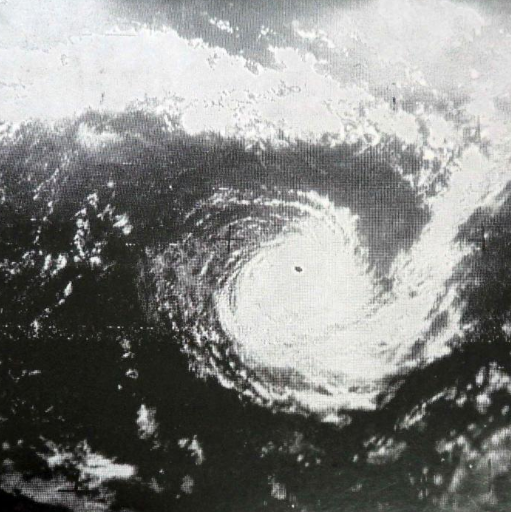
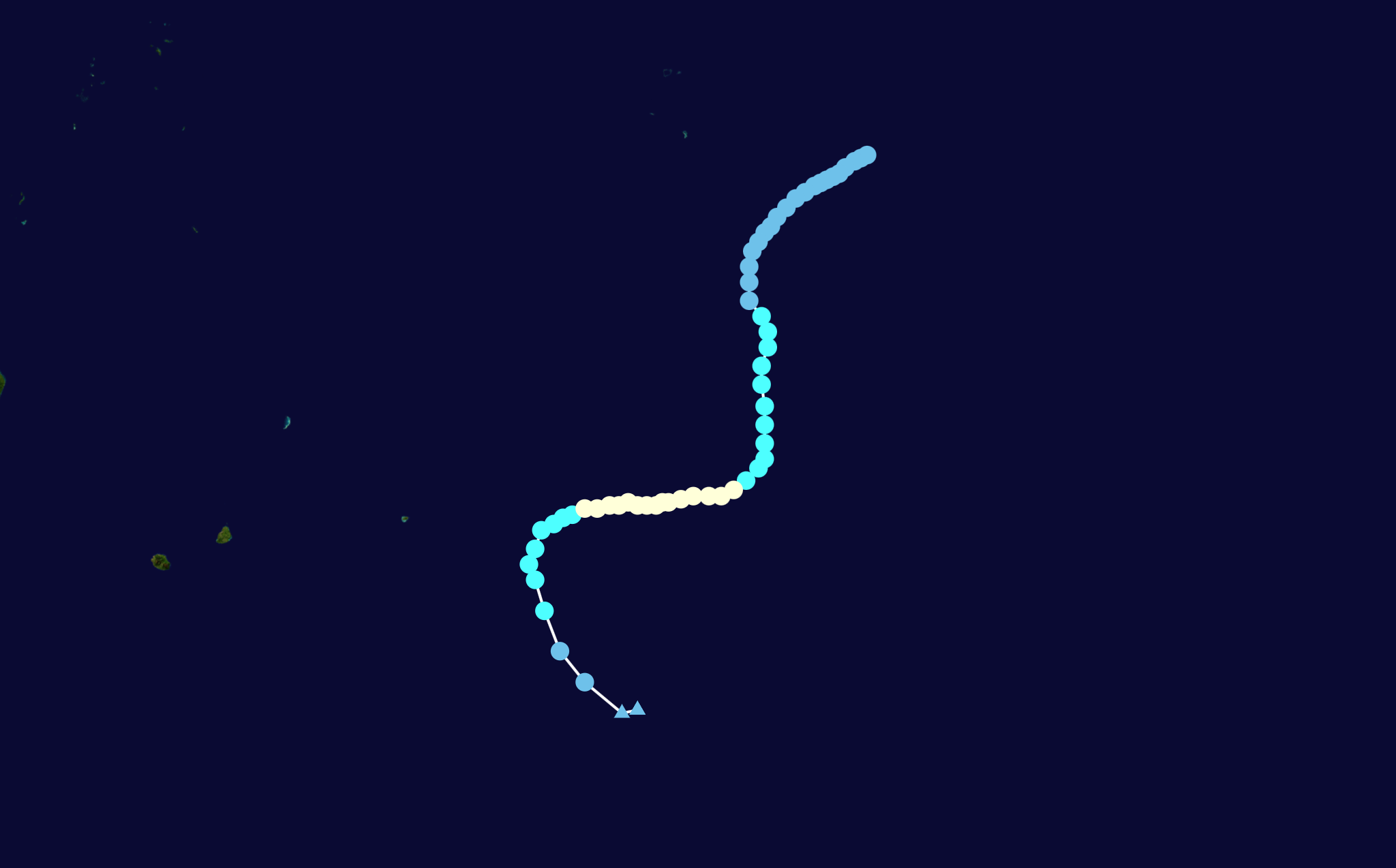
- Duration: December 8 – December 23
- Peak intensity: 120 km/h (75 mph) (10-min);

=== Tropical Cyclone Carmen ===
- Tropical cyclone (MFR)
- Category 2 tropical cyclone (SSHWS)
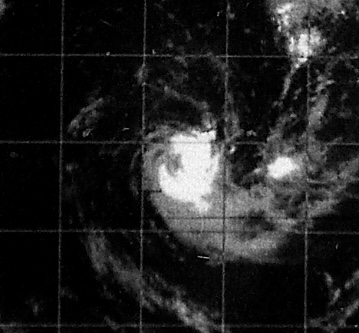
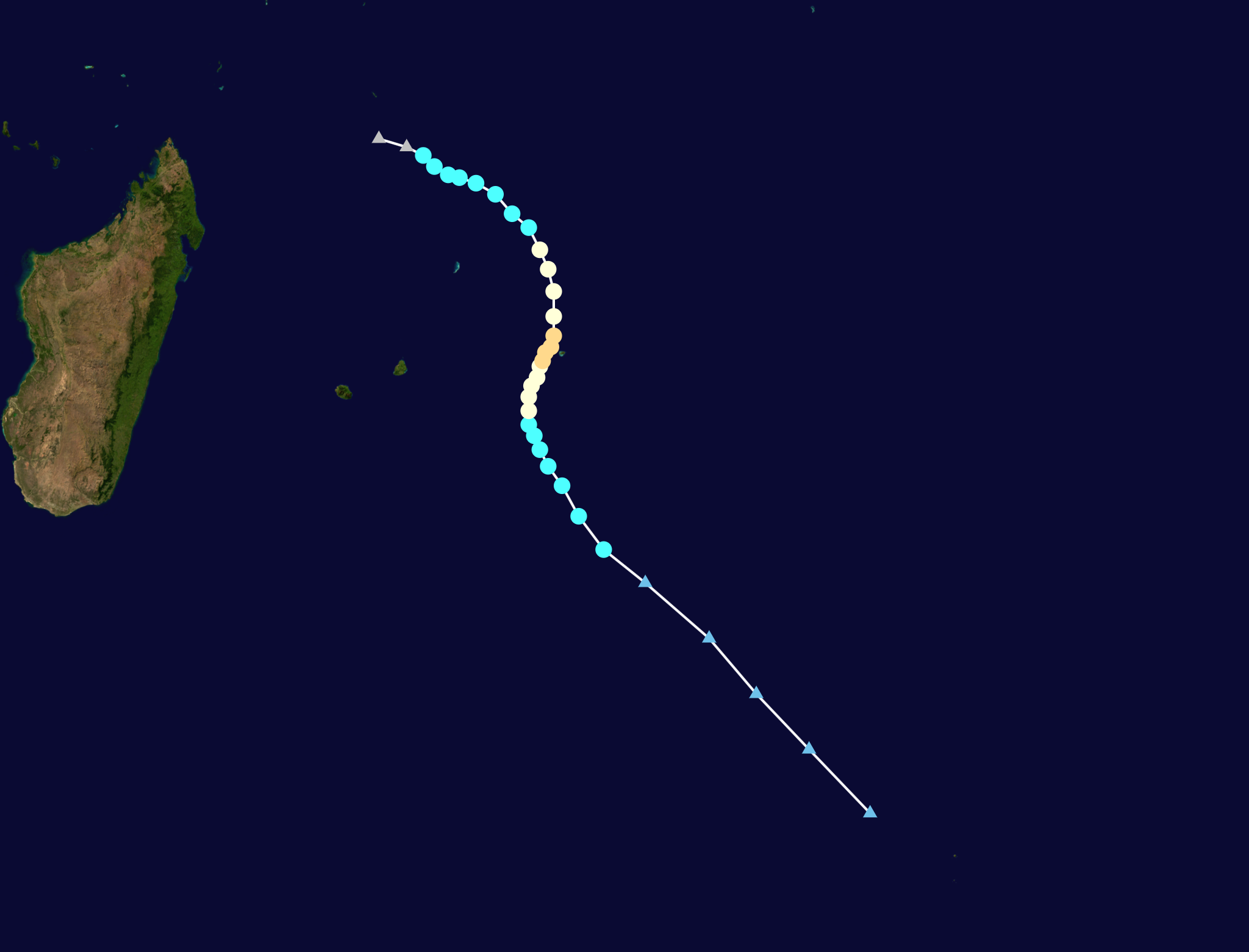
- Duration: December 19 – December 28
- Peak intensity: 140 km/h (85 mph) (10-min); 978 hPa (mbar)

On December 23, Cyclone Carmen passed just west of Rodrigues, producing heavy rainfall and wind gusts of 216 km/h (134 mph). The storm also dropped rainfall on Réunion.

=== Tropical Depression Debby ===
- Tropical depression (MFR)
- Tropical storm (SSHWS)
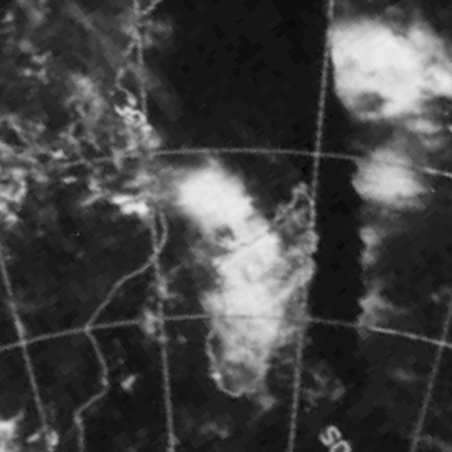
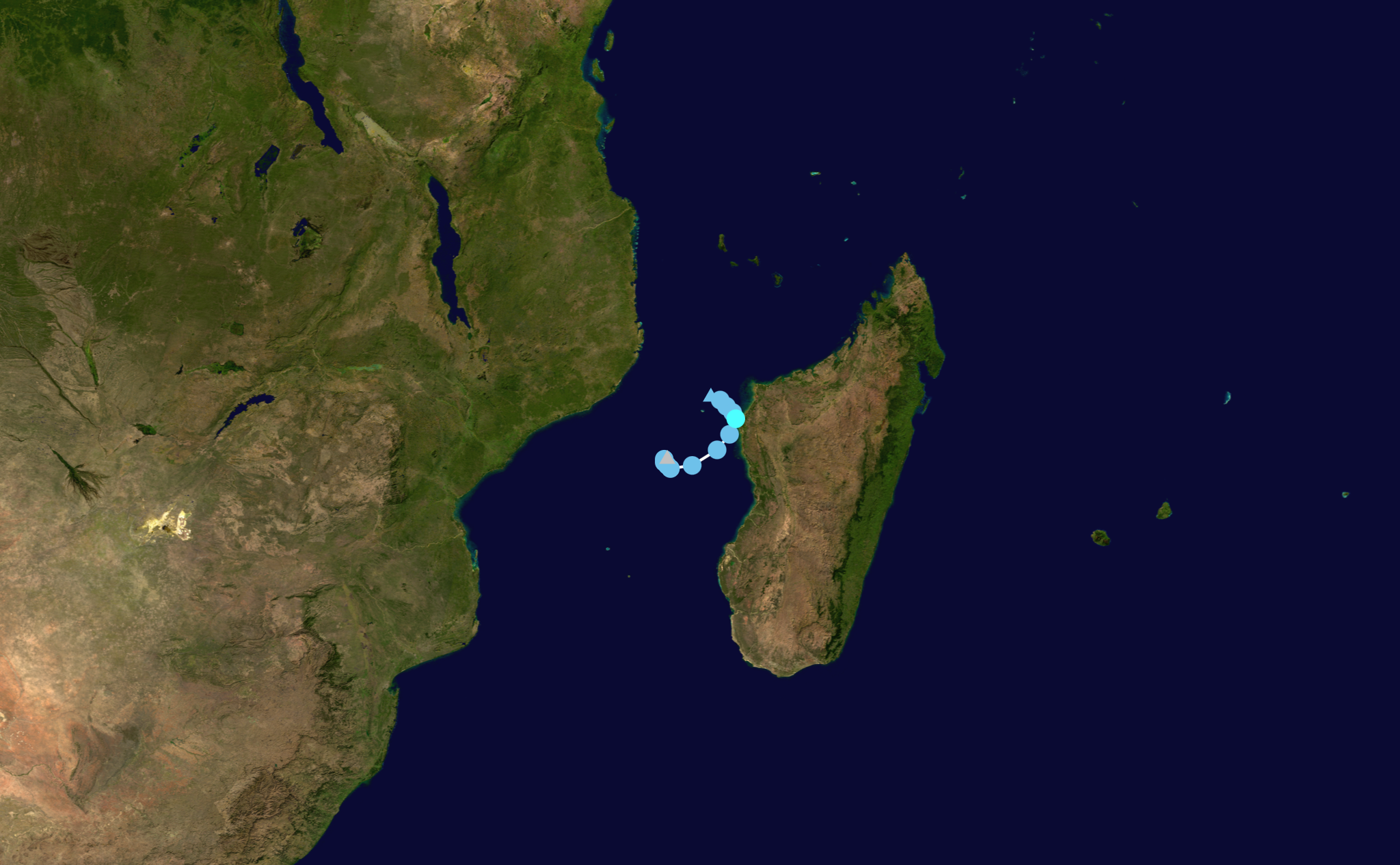
- Duration: December 30 – January 2
- Peak intensity: 55 km/h (35 mph) (10-min);

=== Tropical Cyclone Amy-Elspeth ===
- Tropical cyclone (MFR)
- Category 2 tropical cyclone (SSHWS)
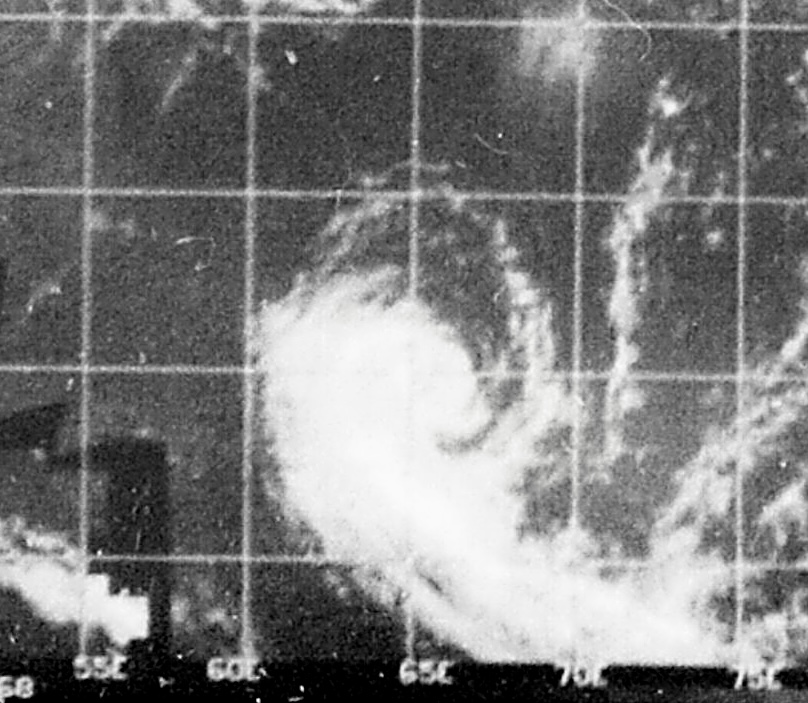
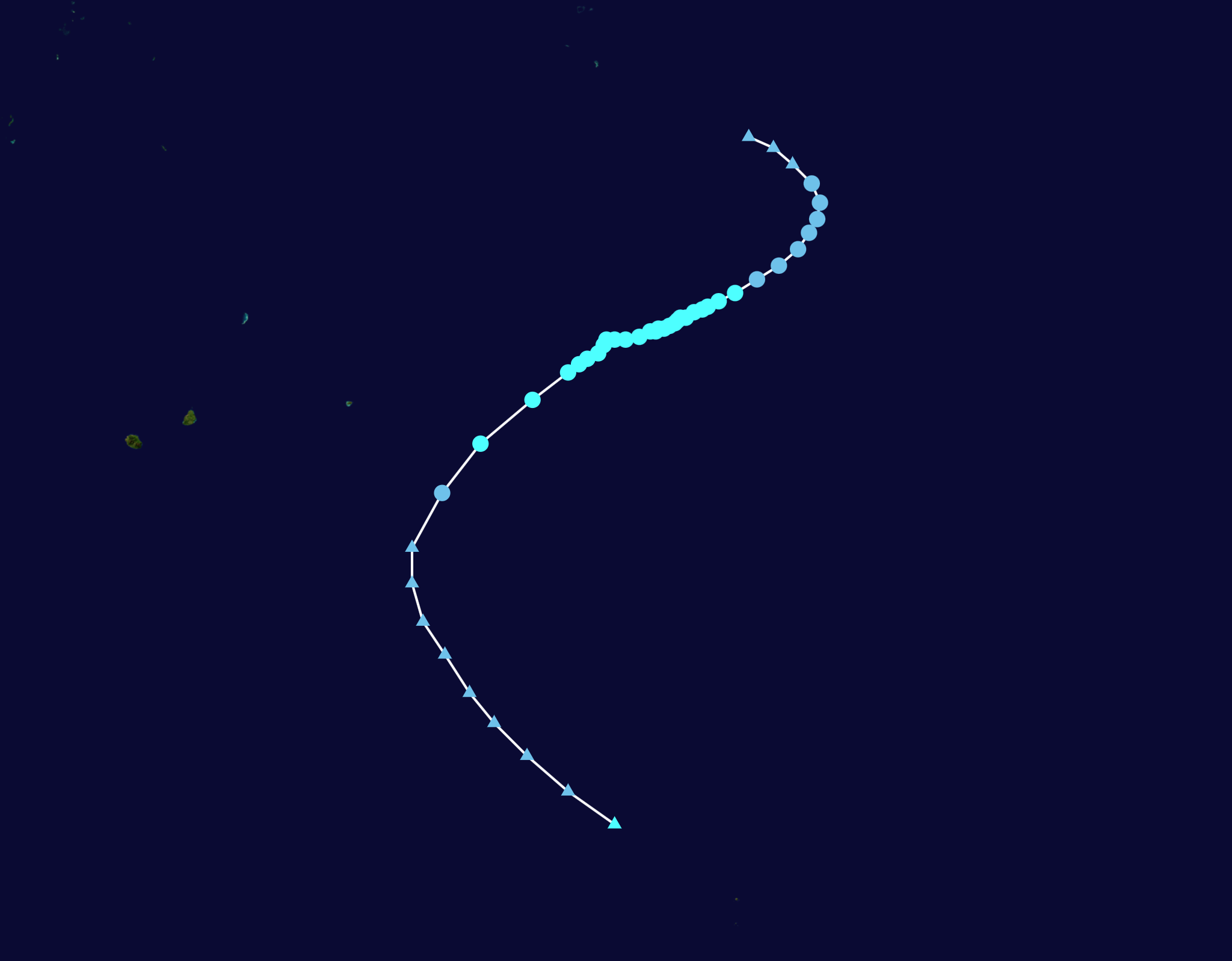
- Duration: December 29 – January 9
- Peak intensity: 150 km/h (90 mph) (10-min);

=== Severe Tropical Storm Flossie ===
- Severe tropical storm (MFR)
- Category 1 tropical cyclone (SSHWS)
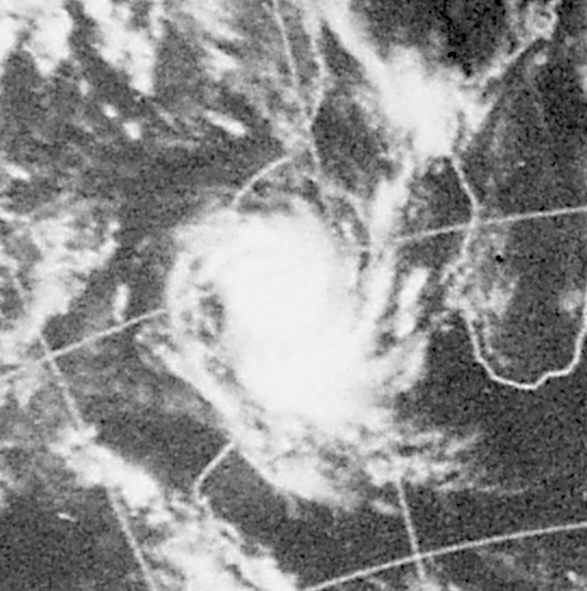
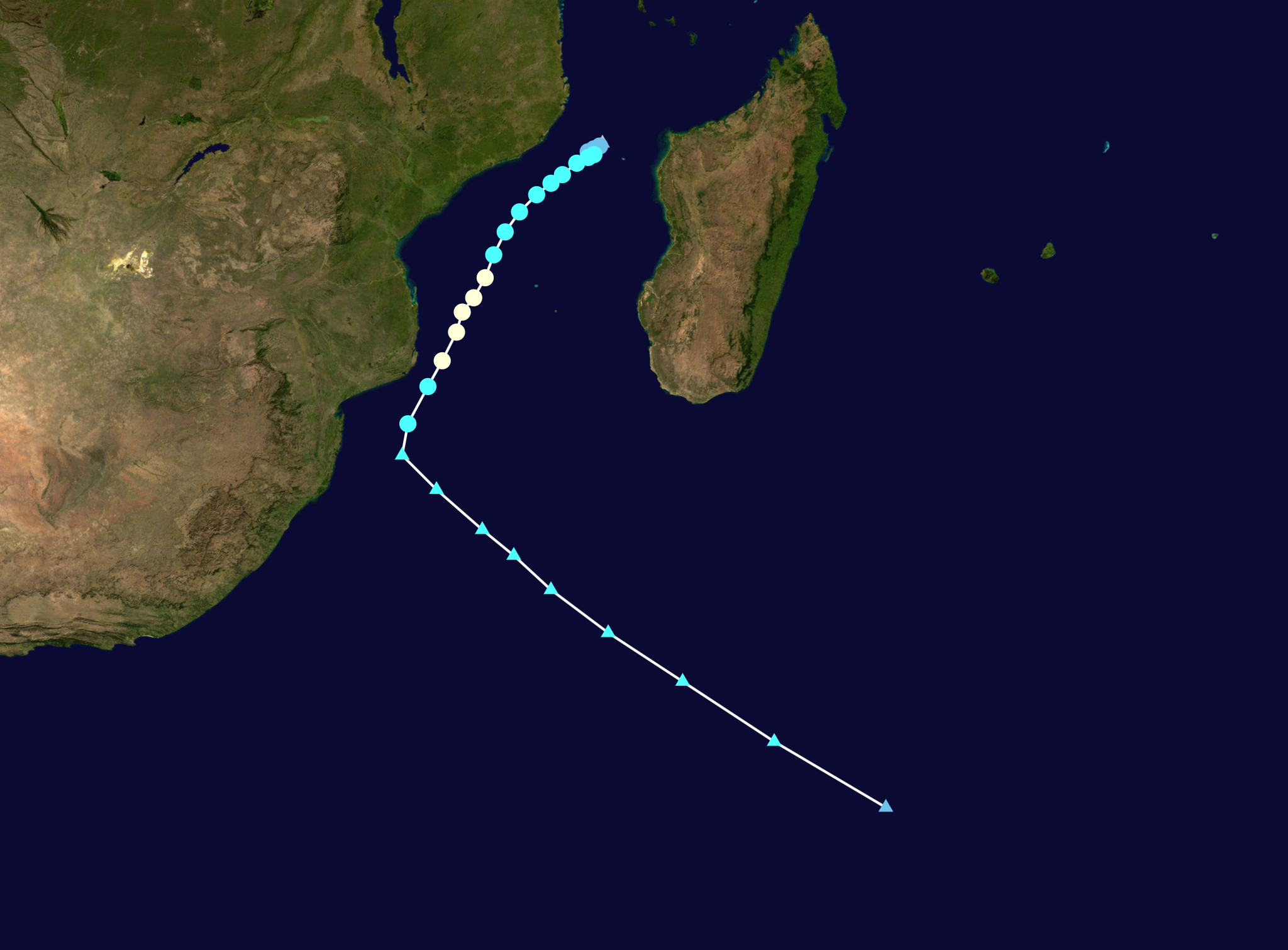
- Duration: January 7 – January 14
- Peak intensity: 110 km/h (70 mph) (10-min);

=== Intense Tropical Cyclone Georgette ===
- Intense tropical cyclone (MFR)
- Category 3 tropical cyclone (SSHWS)
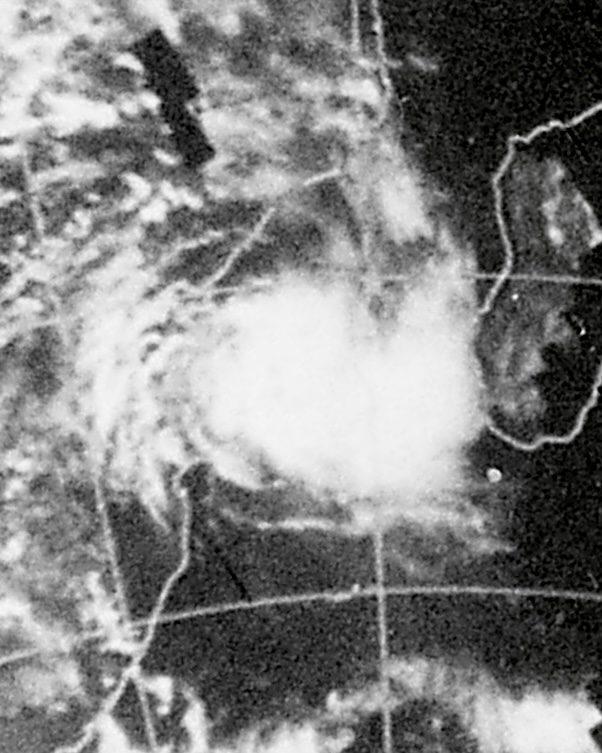
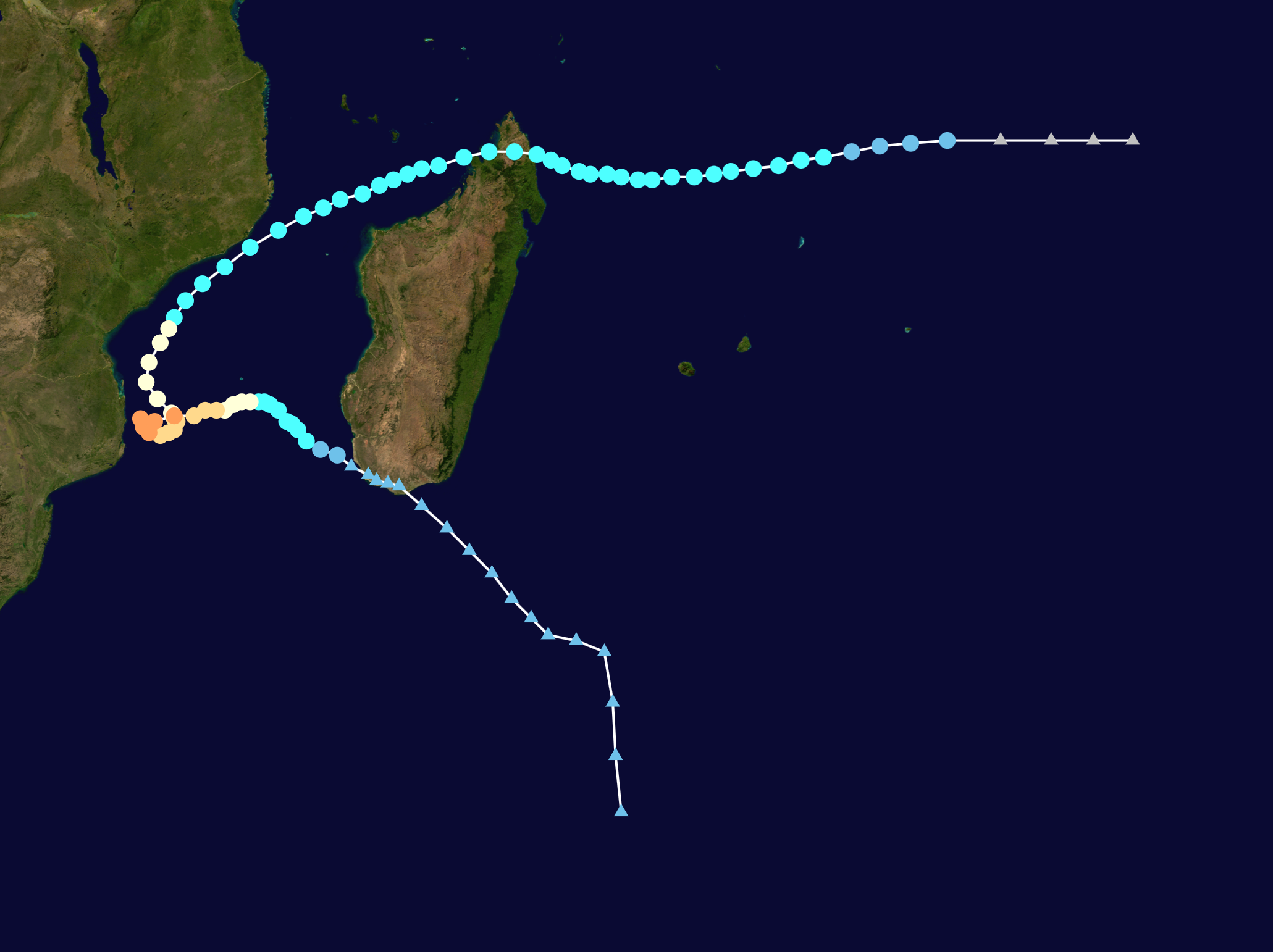
- Duration: January 9 – February 1
- Peak intensity: 165 km/h (105 mph) (10-min);

Prior to Cyclone Freddy in 2023, Cyclone Georgette was the longest-lasting tropical cyclone in the South-West Indian Ocean basin since the advent of satellite imagery. It formed on January 10, 1968, well to the northeast of the Mascarene Islands. Tracking generally westward, Georgette struck northern Madagascar on January 15 as a tropical storm. It moved southwestward in the Mozambique Channel, crossing over eastern Mozambique on January 19. It quickly reached open waters while gradually intensifying, executing a loop off of eastern Mozambique. Georgette continued to the southeast, passing over southern Madagascar on January 28. It was last noted on February 2 after lasting for 24 days.

Georgette killed one person in the Comoros, eight in Mozambique, and 23 in Madagascar. The storm brought heavy, but beneficial rainfall to Réunion.

=== Tropical Cyclone Henriette ===
- Tropical cyclone (MFR)
- Category 2 tropical cyclone (SSHWS)
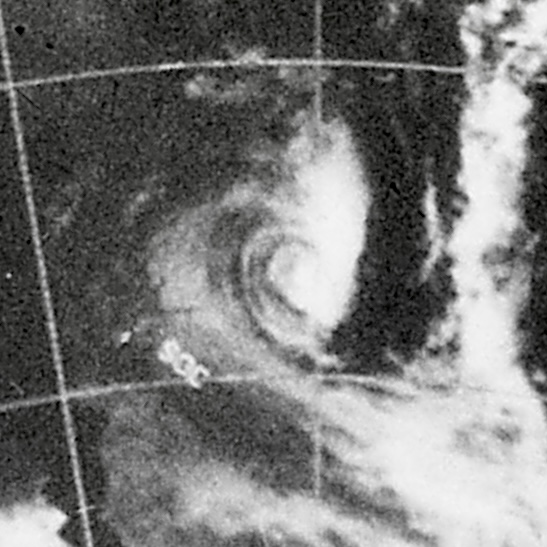
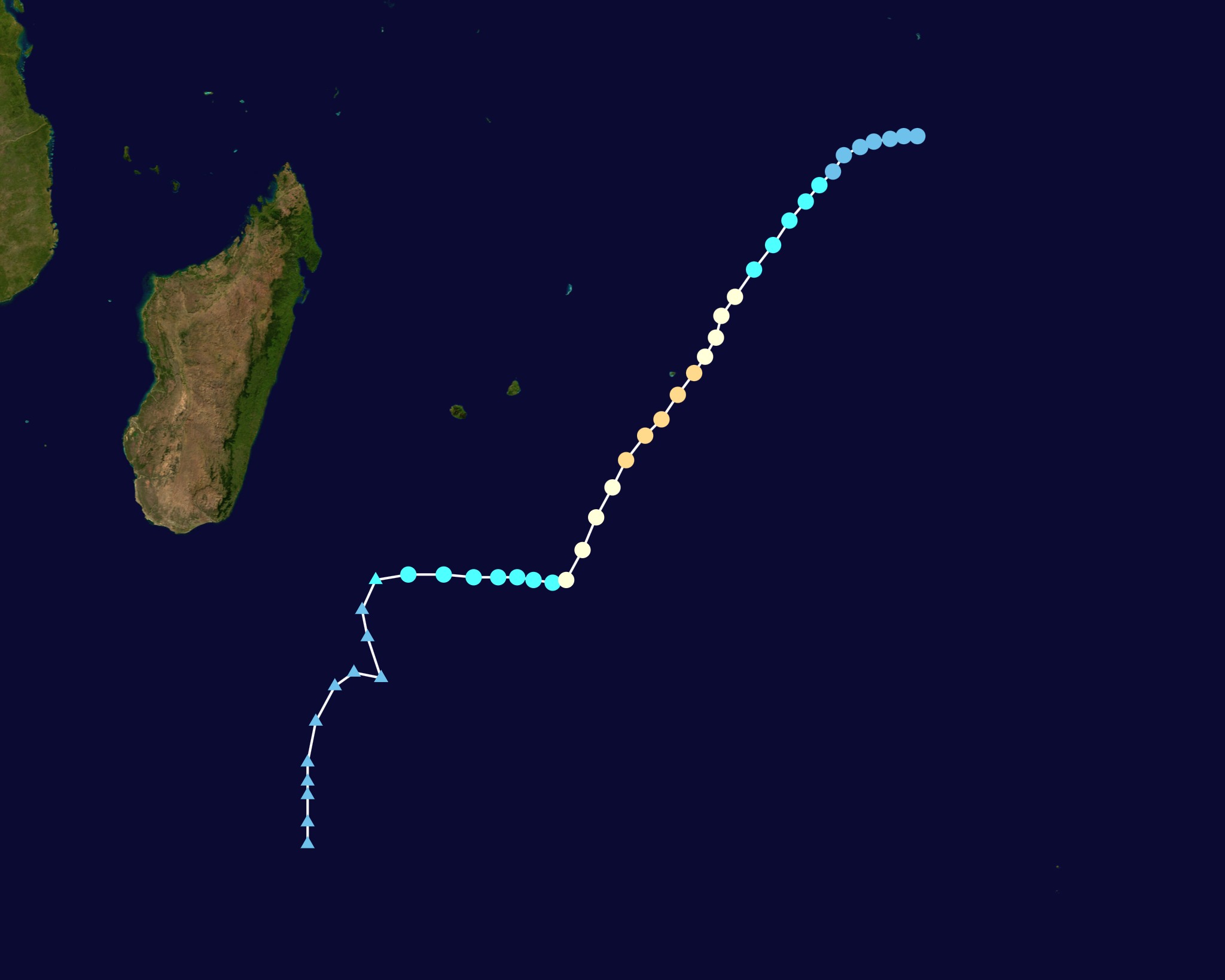
- Duration: January 17 – January 28
- Peak intensity: 150 km/h (90 mph) (10-min);

On January 21, Cyclone Henriette passed just east of Rodrigues, producing 165 km/h (103 mph) wind gusts.

=== Severe Tropical Storm Ida ===
- Severe tropical storm (MFR)
- Tropical storm (SSHWS)
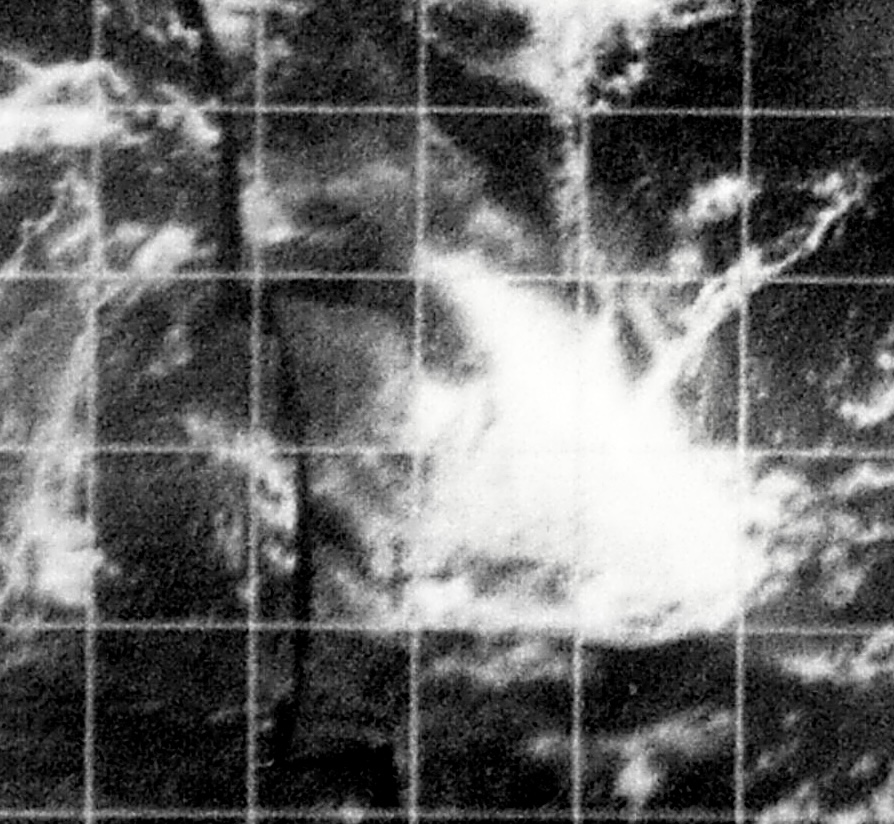
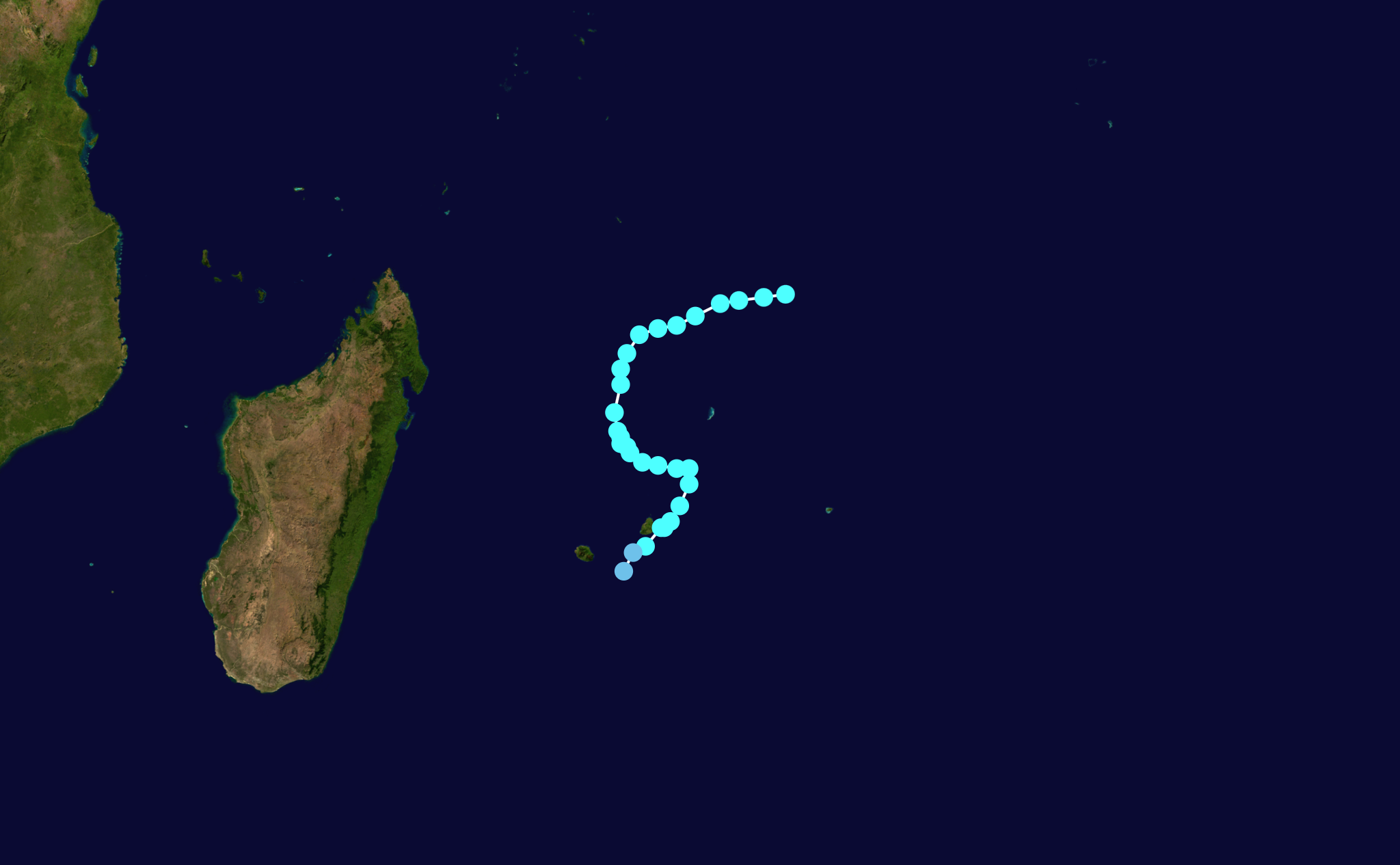
- Duration: February 10 – February 15
- Peak intensity: 95 km/h (60 mph) (10-min);

Ida affected Réunion and Mauritius.

=== Intense Tropical Cyclone Gina–Janine ===
- Intense tropical cyclone (MFR)
- Category 2 tropical cyclone (SSHWS)
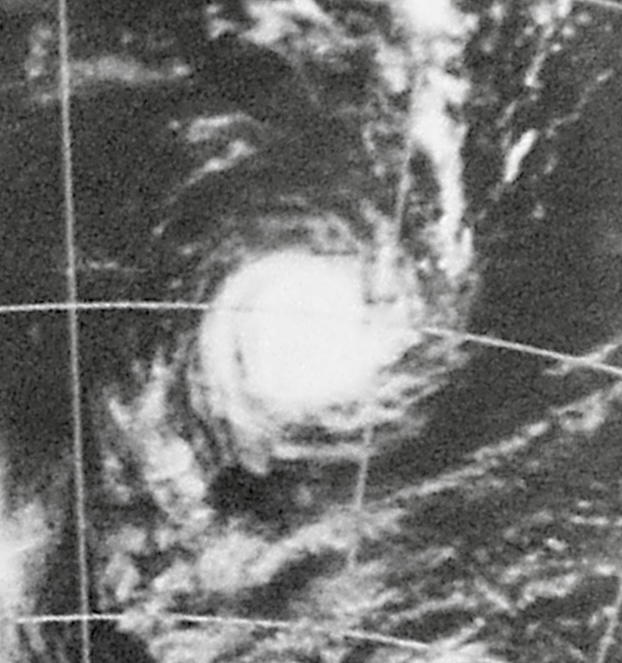
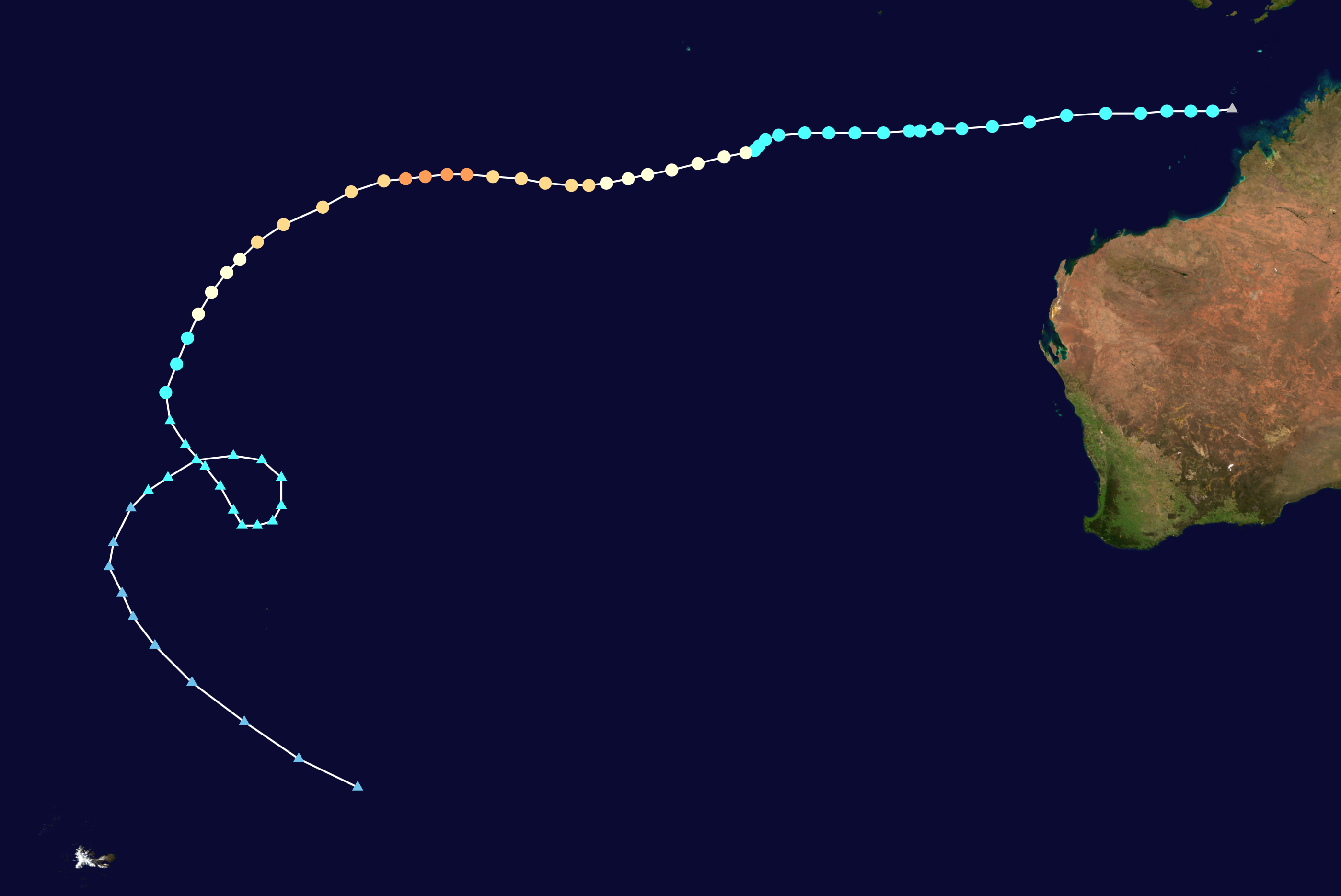
- Duration: February 13 – March 2
- Peak intensity: 165 km/h (105 mph) (10-min);

=== Moderate Tropical Storm Karine ===
- Moderate tropical storm (MFR)
- Tropical storm (SSHWS)
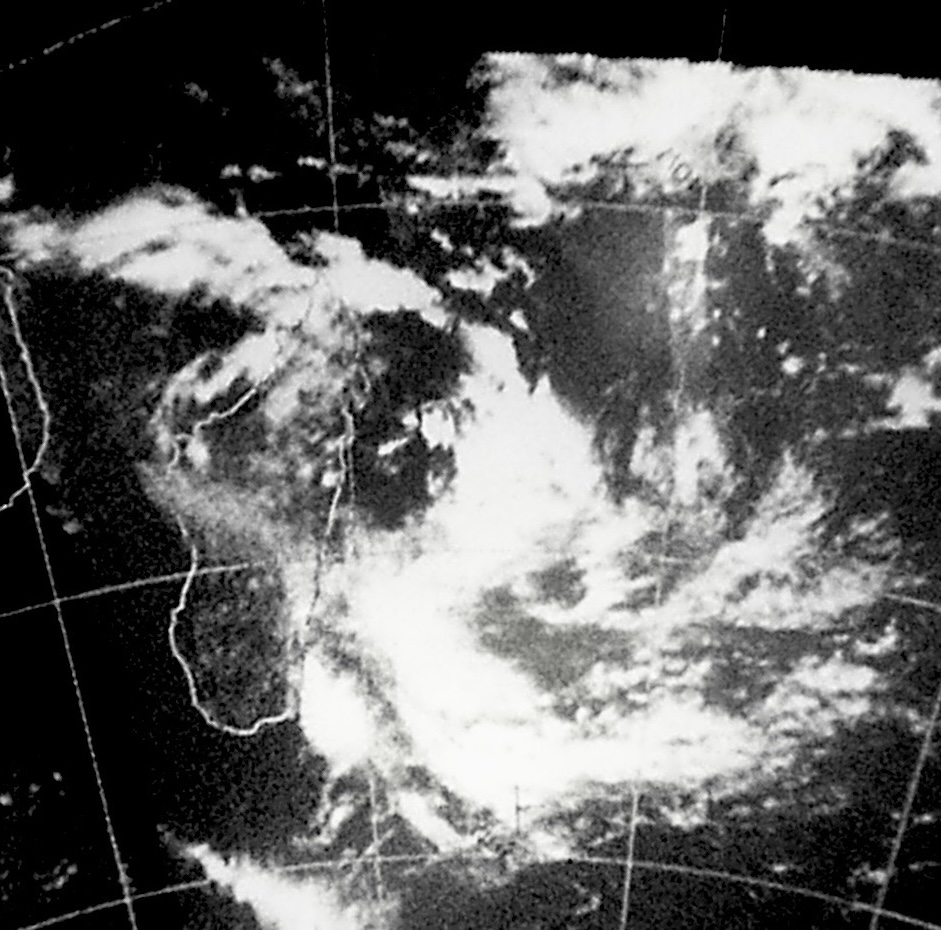
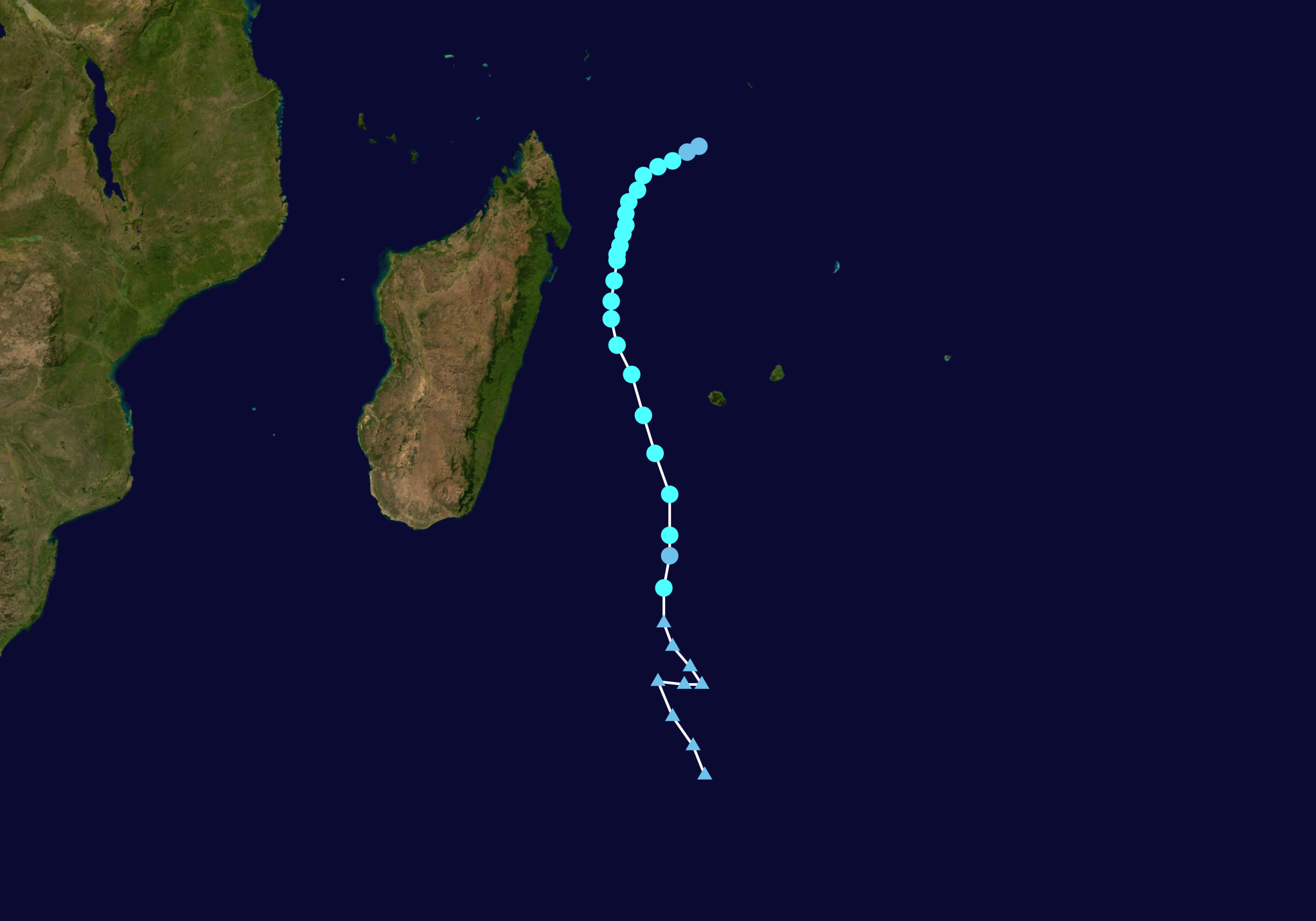
- Duration: March 6 – March 13
- Peak intensity: 75 km/h (45 mph) (10-min);

The storm passed near Réunion, bringing heavy rainfall that caused river flooding. Six people drowned on the island during the storm's passage.

=== Moderate Tropical Storm Lottie ===
- Moderate tropical storm (MFR)
- Tropical storm (SSHWS)
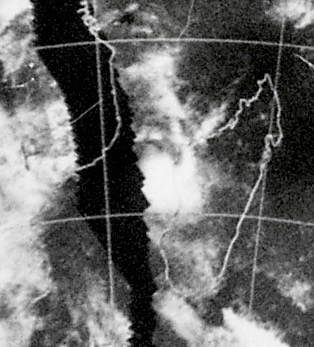
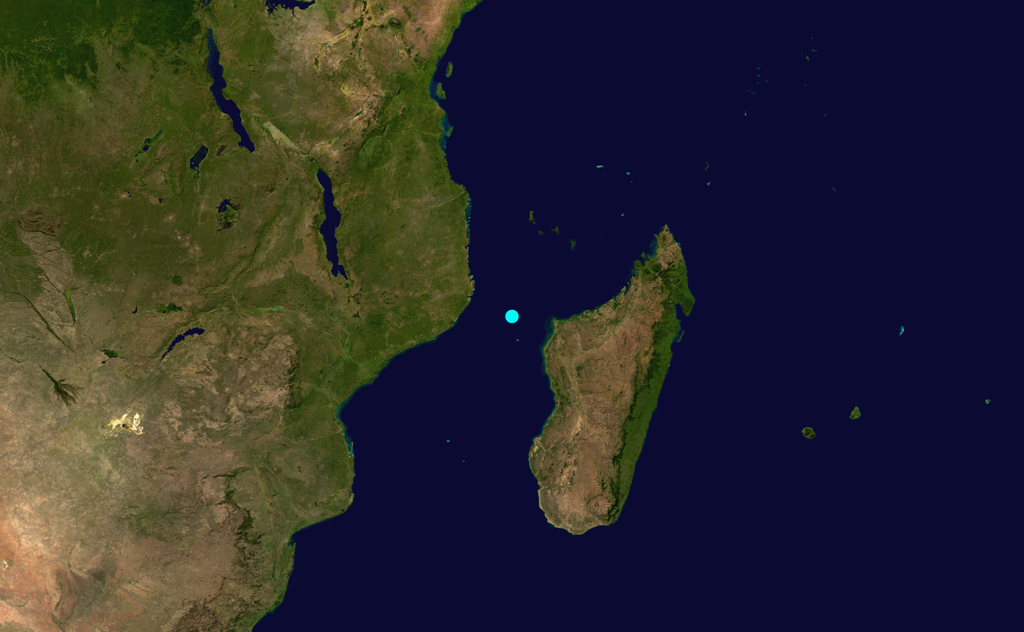
- Duration: March 26 – March 27
- Peak intensity: 65 km/h (40 mph) (10-min);

=== Tropical Cyclone Monique ===
- Tropical cyclone (MFR)
- Category 4 tropical cyclone (SSHWS)
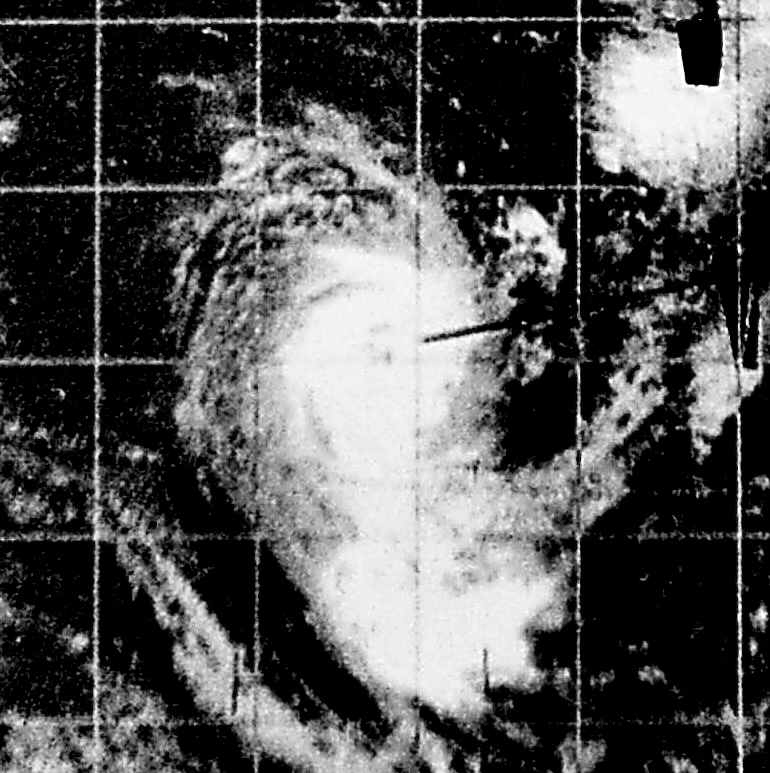
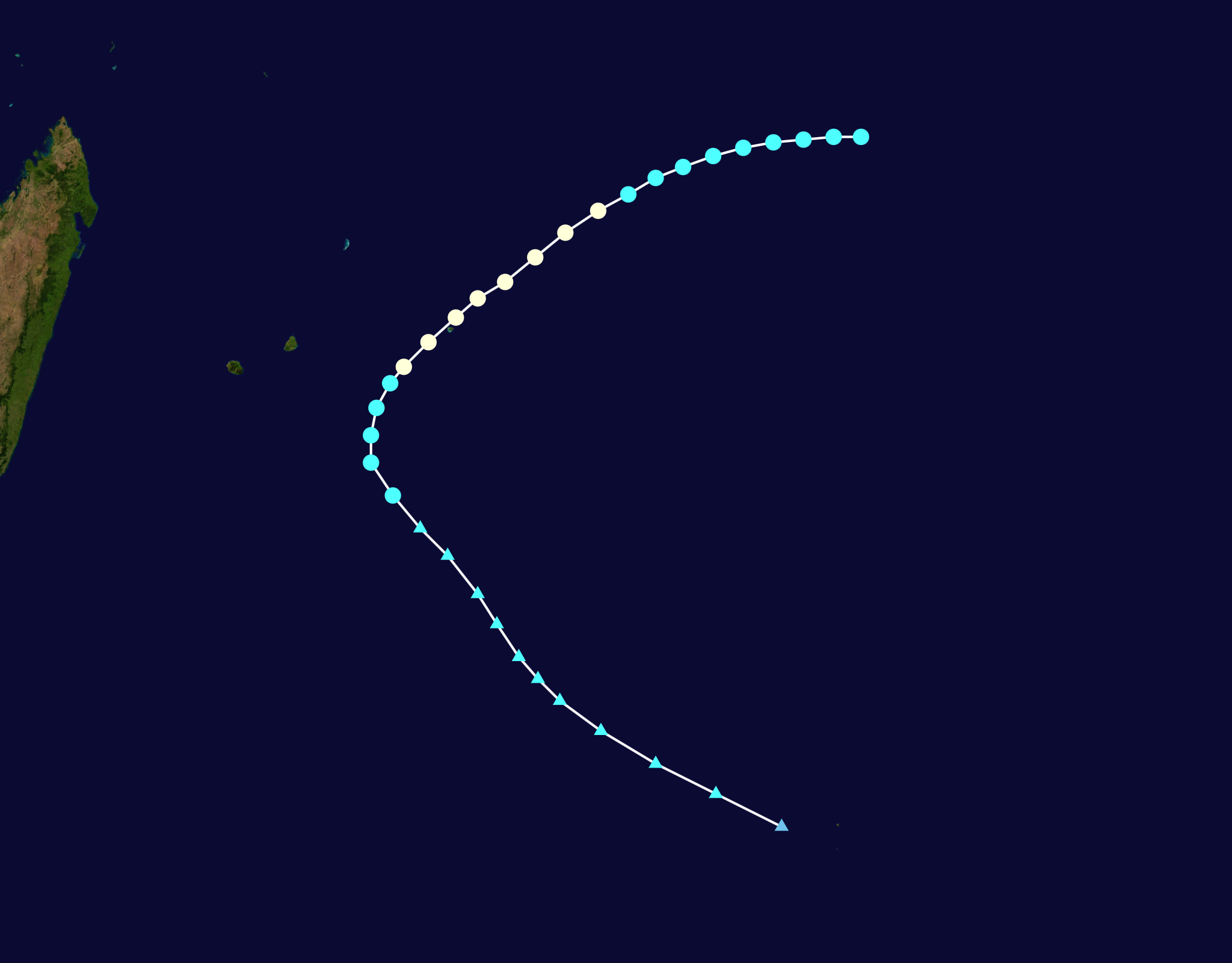
- Duration: March 26 – April 3
- Peak intensity: 130 km/h (80 mph) (10-min); 933 hPa (mbar)

The eye of Cyclone Monique passed just northwest of Rodrigues, producing a minimum pressure of 933 mbar (27.6 inHg), as well as wind gusts of 276 km/h (171 mph) in the island's interior; this was the highest wind gust on record for the island. The winds wrecked most of the island's crops and destroyed many houses while also causing severe erosion. The outskirts of Monique also produced high waves and dropped rainfall in Réunion.

=== Tropical Cyclone Noreen ===
- Tropical cyclone (MFR)
- Category 1 tropical cyclone (SSHWS)
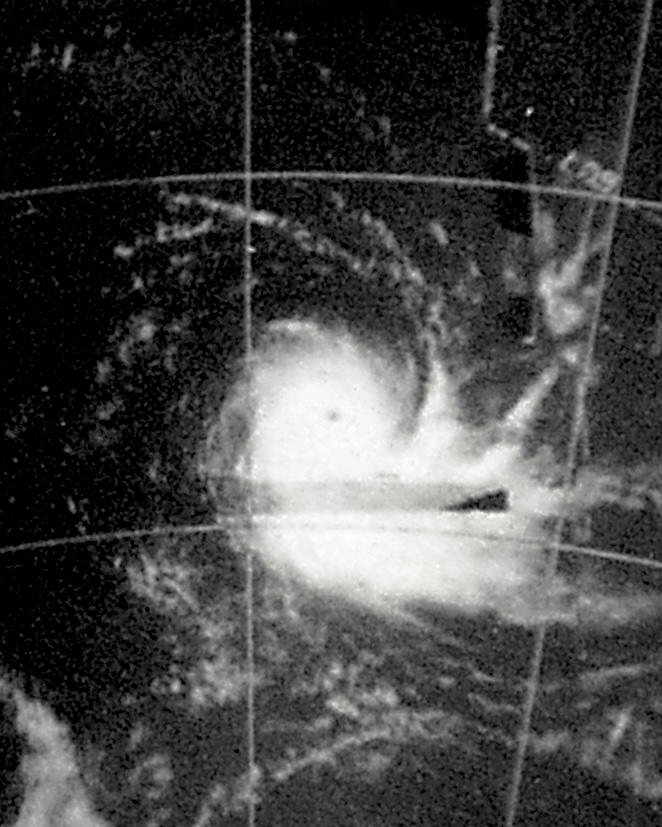
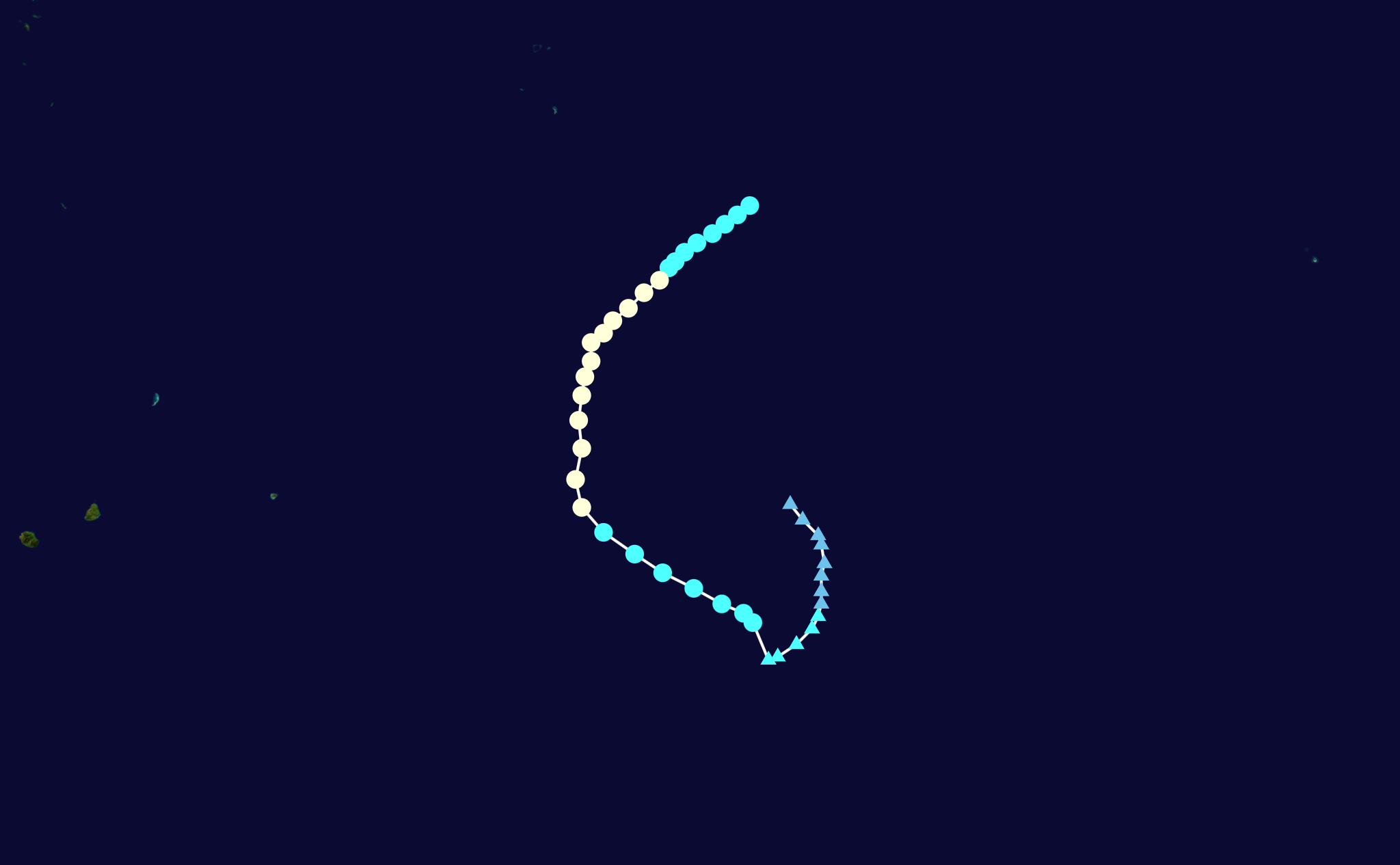
- Duration: April 5 – April 15
- Peak intensity: 130 km/h (80 mph) (10-min);

Noreen existed from April 5 to April 15.

== See also ==
- Atlantic hurricane seasons: 1967, 1968
- Eastern Pacific hurricane seasons: 1967, 1968
- Western Pacific typhoon seasons: 1967, 1968
- North Indian Ocean cyclone seasons: 1967, 1968
