= Tropical cyclones in 1978 =

- Typhoon Rita persisting as a Category 5 Super Typhoon for three consecutive days

Year boundaries
- First system: Nadine
- Formed: January 6, 1978
- Last system: Peter
- Dissipated: January 3, 1979

Strongest system
- Name: Rita
- Lowest pressure: 878 mbar (hPa); 25.93 inHg

Longest lasting system
- Name: Fico
- Duration: 22 days

Year statistics
- Total systems: 110
- Named systems: 88
- Total fatalities: 1,496 total
- Total damage: $1.243 billion (1978 USD)
Related articles
- 1978 Atlantic hurricane season
- 1978 Pacific hurricane season
- 1978 Pacific typhoon season
- 1978 North Indian Ocean cyclone season
- 1977–78 South-West Indian Ocean cyclone season
- 1978–79 South-West Indian Ocean cyclone season
- 1977–78 Australian region cyclone season
- 1978–79 Australian region cyclone season
- 1977–78 South Pacific cyclone season
- 1978–79 South Pacific cyclone season

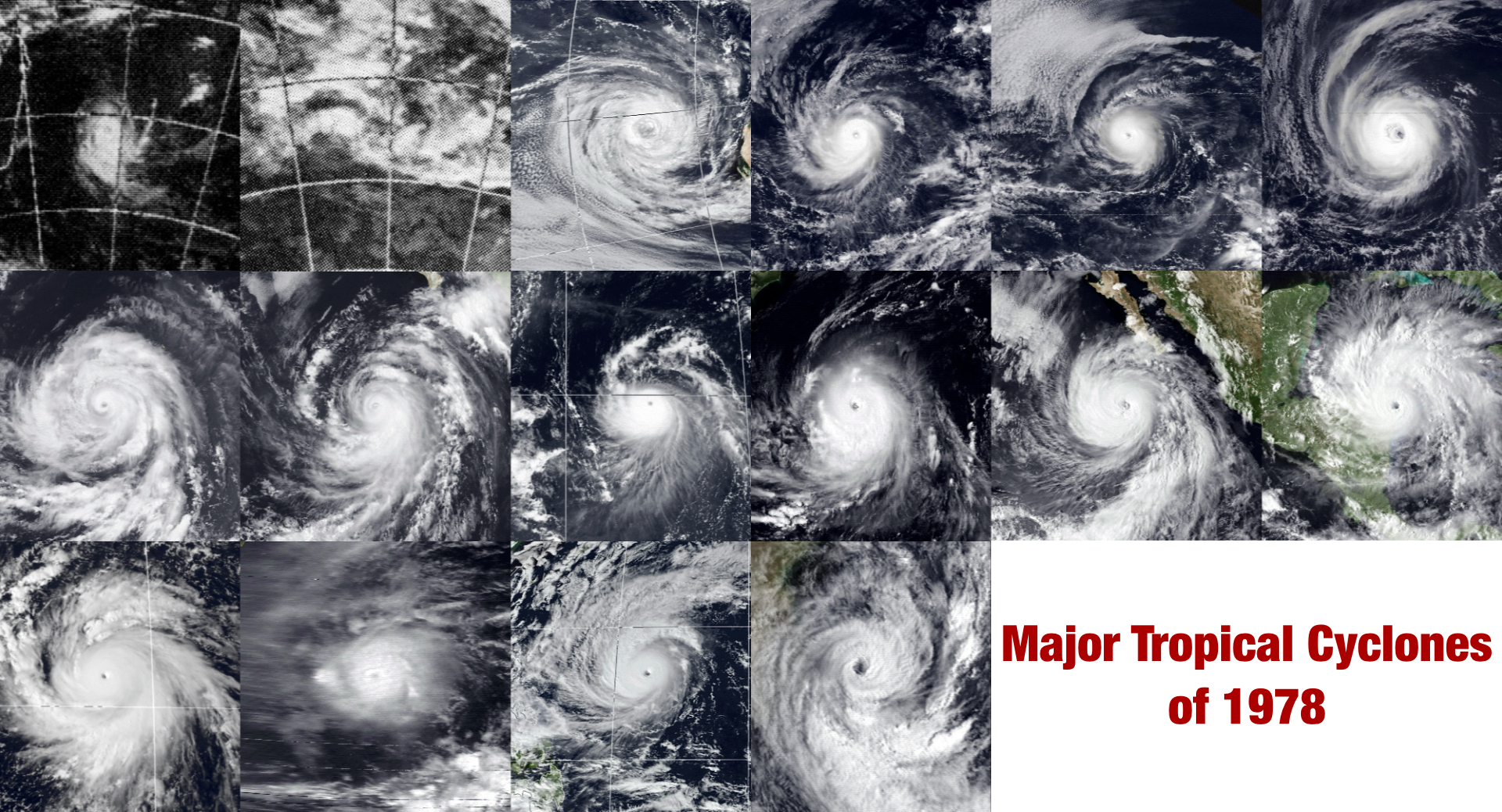
Satellite photos of the 16 tropical cyclones worldwide that reached at least Category 3 on the Saffir–Simpson scale during 1978, from Fleur in January to Angele in December. Among them, Rita (first image on the third line) is the most intense with a minimum central pressure of 878 hPa.

During 1978, tropical cyclones formed within seven different tropical cyclone basins, located within various parts of the Atlantic, Pacific and Indian Oceans. During the year, a total of 110 systems formed, with 88 of these developing further and being named by the responsible warning centre. The strongest tropical cyclone of the year was Typhoon Rita, with a minimum barometric pressure of 878 hPa (25.93 inHg). The deadliest and costliest tropical cyclone of the year was the 1978 Sri Lanka cyclone that killed an estimated 915 people and caused $627 million in damages.

Compared to the previous year, 1978 formed less tropical cyclones. However, more of them were named than the previous year. The most active basin of the year was the Western Pacific which had 30 total storms that were named. Both the Eastern Pacific and Atlantic basins were above normal in activity, with 19 and 12 nameable storms forming respectively. The North Indian basin saw activity that was on par with the climatological norm. The southern hemisphere saw average numbers throughout each basin, being the South-West Indian Ocean, Australian region, and the South Pacific.

Tropical cyclone activity in each basin is under the authority of an RSMC. The National Hurricane Center (NHC) is responsible for tropical cyclones in the North Atlantic. The Eastern Pacific Hurricane Center (EPHC) is responsible for tropical cyclones in the Eastern Pacific. (Note: The Eastern Pacific Hurricane Center (EPHC) was the RSMC responsible for tracking tropical cyclones east of 140°W until the National Hurricane Center (NHC) took responsibility in the Spring of 1988.) The Central Pacific Hurricane Center (CPHC) is responsible for tropical cyclones in the Central Pacific. The NHC, EPHC, (Note: The Eastern Pacific Hurricane Center (EPHC) was the RSMC responsible for tracking tropical cyclones east of 140°W until the National Hurricane Center (NHC) took responsibility in the Spring of 1988.) and CPHC are subdivisions of the National Weather Service. Activity in the West Pacific is monitored by the Japan Meteorological Agency (JMA), at the time the Joint Typhoon Warning Center (JTWC) named tropical cyclones in the basin. Systems in the North Indian Ocean are monitored by the India Meteorological Department (IMD). The Météo-France located in Réunion (MFR) monitors tropical activity in the South-West Indian Ocean. The Australian region is monitored by five TCWCs that are under the coordination of the Australian Bureau of Meteorology (BOM). Similarly, the South Pacific is monitored by both the Fiji Meteorological Service (FMS) and the Meteorological Service of New Zealand Limited. Another, unofficial agency that provides additional guidance in tropical cyclone monitoring is the Philippine Atmospheric, Geophysical and Astronomical Services Administration (PAGASA).

== Global atmospheric and hydrological conditions ==
Animated loop of Sea Surface Temperature (SST) anomalies throughout 1978

Tropical cyclone climatology and variability throughout 1978 was dominated by a neutral El Niño Southern Oscillation (ENSO) that had emerged from a weakening Central Pacific-based El Niño event from the previous year, these neutral conditions persisted into the winter, and onto the next year.

== Summary ==
=== North Atlantic Ocean ===
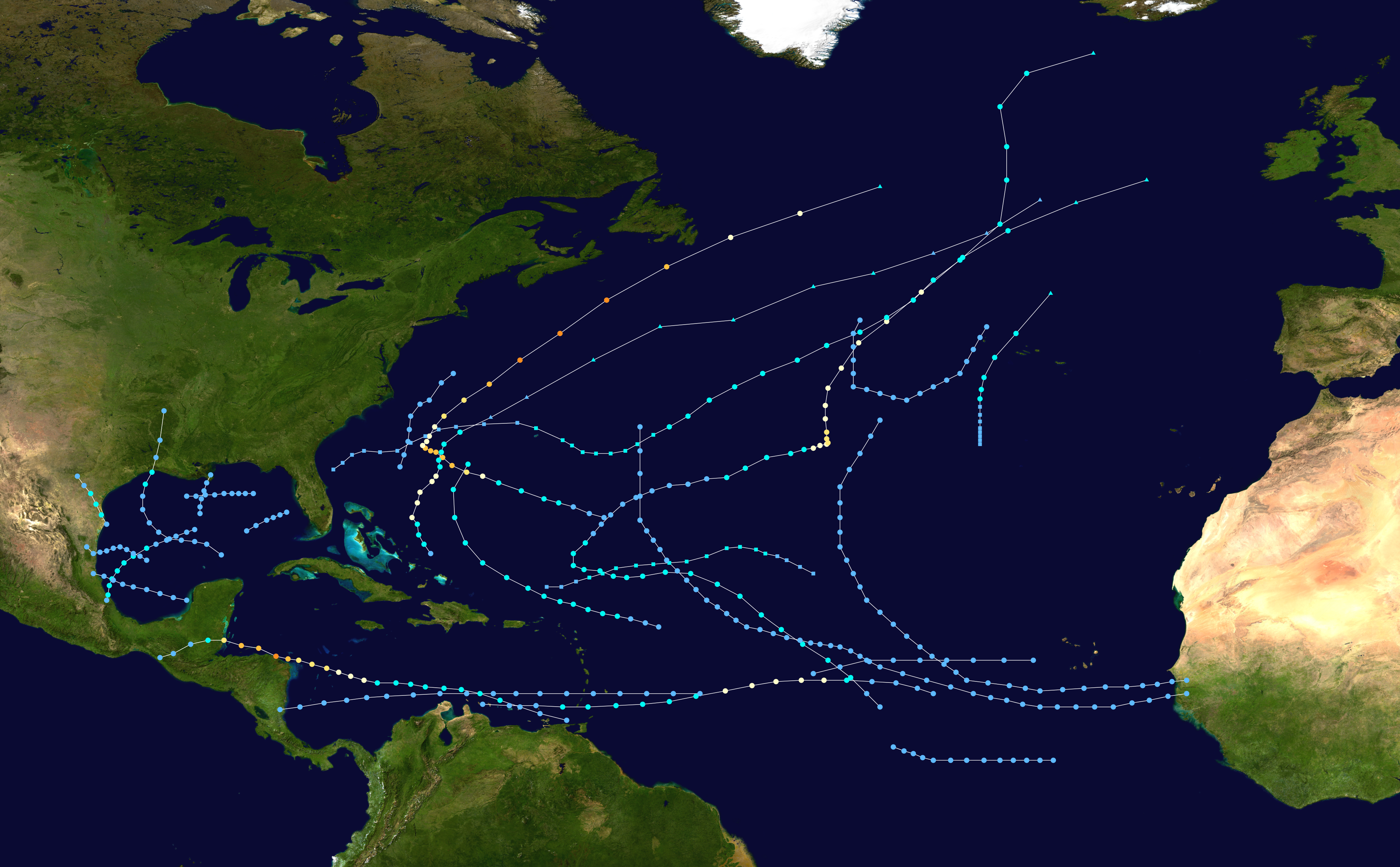
1978 Atlantic hurricane season summary map

Atlantic hurricane season was slightly above average in terms of number of named storms. Eleven tropical cyclones were named in all, and five of these became hurricanes; two of the five became a major hurricane (Category 3 or higher on the Saffir–Simpson scale). This was also the last Atlantic hurricane season to use an all-female naming list. The season officially began on June 1, 1978, and ended on November 30, 1978. These dates, adopted by convention, denote the period in each year when most tropical cyclogenesis occurs in the Atlantic basin. However, the formation of subtropical or tropical cyclones is possible at any time of the year, as shown by the formation of an unnamed subtropical storm on January 18.

Three storms made landfall along the coast of the western Gulf of Mexico during the season. At the end of July and into early August, short-lived Tropical Storm Amelia and its remnants caused extensive flooding in Texas after dropping as much as 48 in (1,200 mm) of rain. There were 33 deaths and US$110 million (equivalent to $414 million in 2024) in damage. Also in August, Tropical Storm Bess made landfall in Veracruz, and later, Tropical Storm Debra did so in Louisiana. Neither caused significant damage, though Debra or its remnants spawned multiple tornadoes that killed two people. Hurricanes Ella and Greta each reached Category 4 strength. Though remaining out at sea, Ella did lash the East Coast of the United States and Atlantic Canada with gusty winds and rip currents in early September. Greta brought strong winds, high tides, and flooding to Central America, particularly Belize and Honduras, resulting in about $25 million in damage and at least five fatalities. The storm crossed intact into the eastern Pacific Ocean and was renamed Olivia. Overall, the storms of this season collectively caused $141 million in damage and 42 fatalities.

=== Eastern & Central Pacific Ocean ===
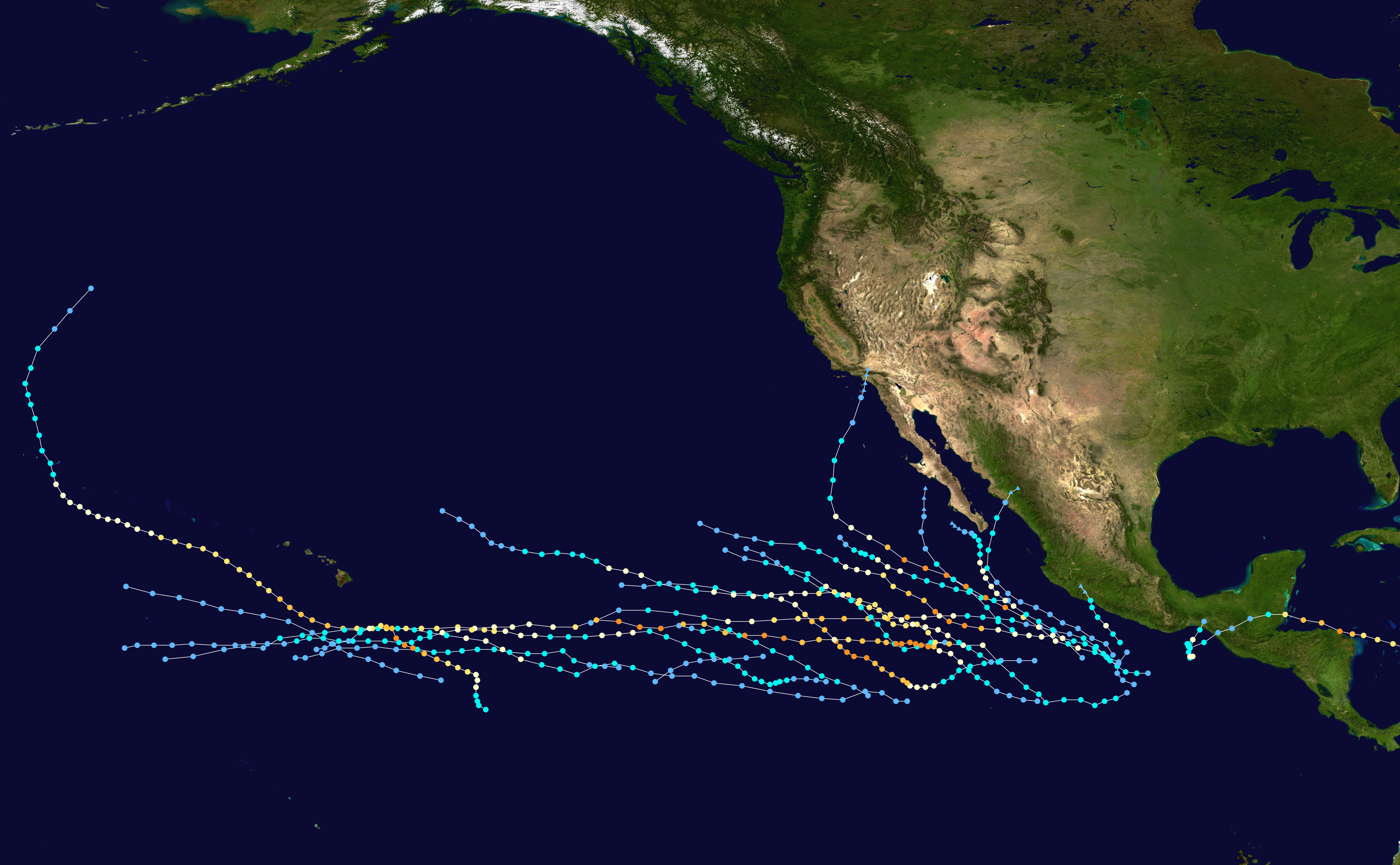
1978 Pacific hurricane season summary map

This year’s Pacific hurricane season was the first Pacific hurricane season to use both masculine and feminine names for tropical cyclones. It also began the modern practice of utilizing naming lists every six years. Despite lacking an El Niño, a common driver of enhanced activity in the East and Central Pacific basins, the 1978 season was active. It featured 19 named storms, 14 hurricanes, and 7 major hurricanes, the latter of which are Category 3 or stronger cyclones on the Saffir–Simpson scale. Within the confines of the Central Pacific basin, located between the International Date Line and 140°W, 13 tropical cyclones or their remnants were observed by forecasters at the Central Pacific Hurricane Center, a record number of occurrences at the time. Seasonal activity began on May 30 and ended on October 21, within the limits of a traditional hurricane season which begins on May 15 in the East Pacific and June 1 in the Central Pacific. The season ends on November 30 in both basins. These dates conventionally delimit the period during each year when most tropical cyclones form.

The first system of the season, Aletta, made landfall on the Mexico coastline on May 31. Hurricanes Carlotta, Daniel, and Iva tracked into the Central Pacific as dissipating cyclones, where they produced a few inches of rainfall across the Hawaiian Islands. More substantive impacts came from Hurricane Fico, the longest-lived hurricane and the longest-tracked hurricane on record in the Central Pacific at the time. Large waves and rough seas caused severe damage to beachfront homes and forced the rescuing of stranded boaters offshore. Strong winds damaged trees and caused power outages. Damage across Hawaii totaled $200,000. In early September, the remnants of Hurricane Norman produced accumulating rain and snow across California, resulting in severe damage to its crops that totaled in excess of $300 million, in addition to killing eight people. In mid-October, Susan rapidly developed into a Category 4 hurricane over the Central Pacific, one of the strongest hurricanes on record there at the time. It persisted until October 21, marking an end to seasonal activity.

=== Western Pacific Ocean ===
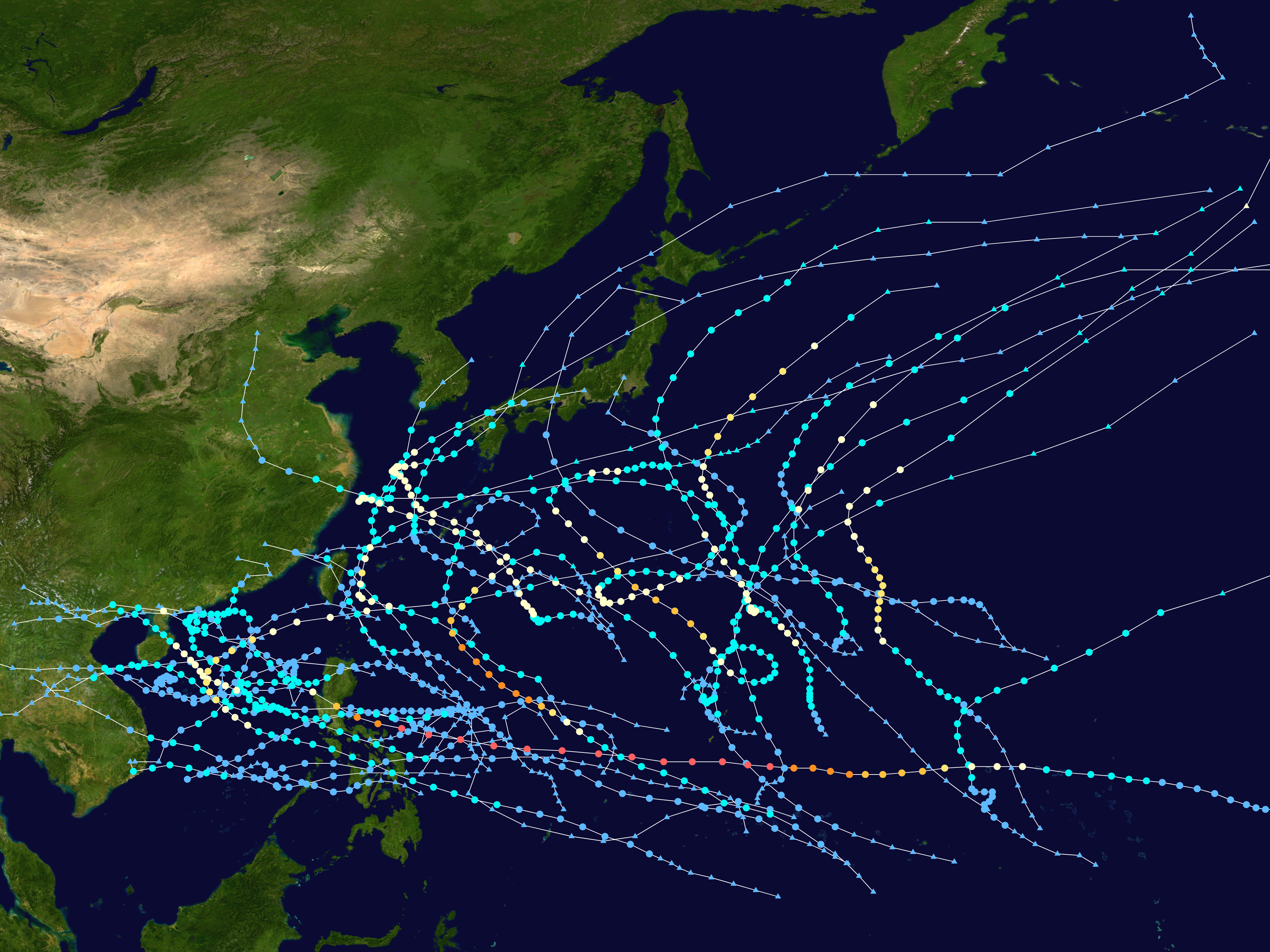
1978 Pacific typhoon season summary map

The 1978 Pacific typhoon season was a very active season that produced 31 tropical storms, 16 typhoons and one intense typhoon. It ran year-round in 1978, but most tropical cyclones tend to form in the northwestern Pacific Ocean between June and December. These dates conventionally delimit the period of each year when most tropical cyclones form in the northwestern Pacific Ocean.

The first system formed on January 6, while the final system dissipated on December 19. The season's strongest storm was Typhoon Rita, which attained peak 1-minute sustained winds of 175 mph (280 km/h) and a minimum central pressure of 878 mbar (25.93 inHg). Rita was also the season's costliest and deadliest storm of the season, causing approximately US$100 million in damage and more than 300 fatalities, primarily across the Philippines. Other destructive storms included Typhoon Olive, which killed 66 people in the Philippines, Hong Kong, and Taiwan, and Typhoon Carmen, which caused US$3 million in damage and 21 deaths in the Ryukyu Islands, eastern China, and Korea. Overall, tropical cyclones during the season caused at least 1,374 deaths and more than US$760 million in damage.

=== North Indian Ocean ===
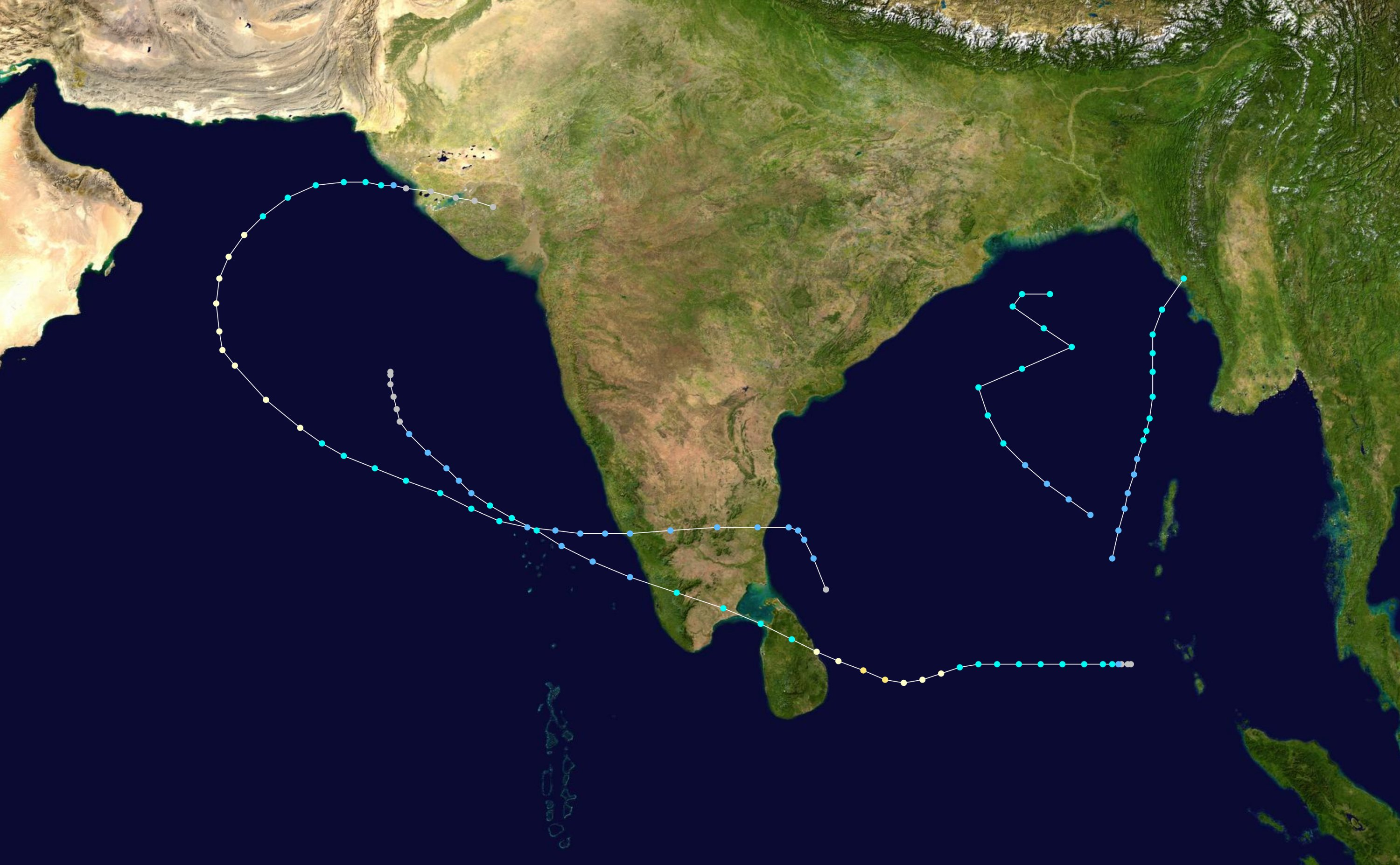
1978 North Indian Ocean cyclone season summary map

The 1978 North Indian Ocean cyclone season had no bounds, but tropical cyclones in the North Indian Ocean tend to form between April and December, with peaks in May and November. The 1978 season produced five cyclonic storms of which developed into three severe cyclonic storms. All five of the storms formed in the Bay of Bengal and four of those made landfall. The most notable storm of the season was BOB 11 which hit Sri Lanka.

=== South-West Indian Ocean ===
==== January-June ====
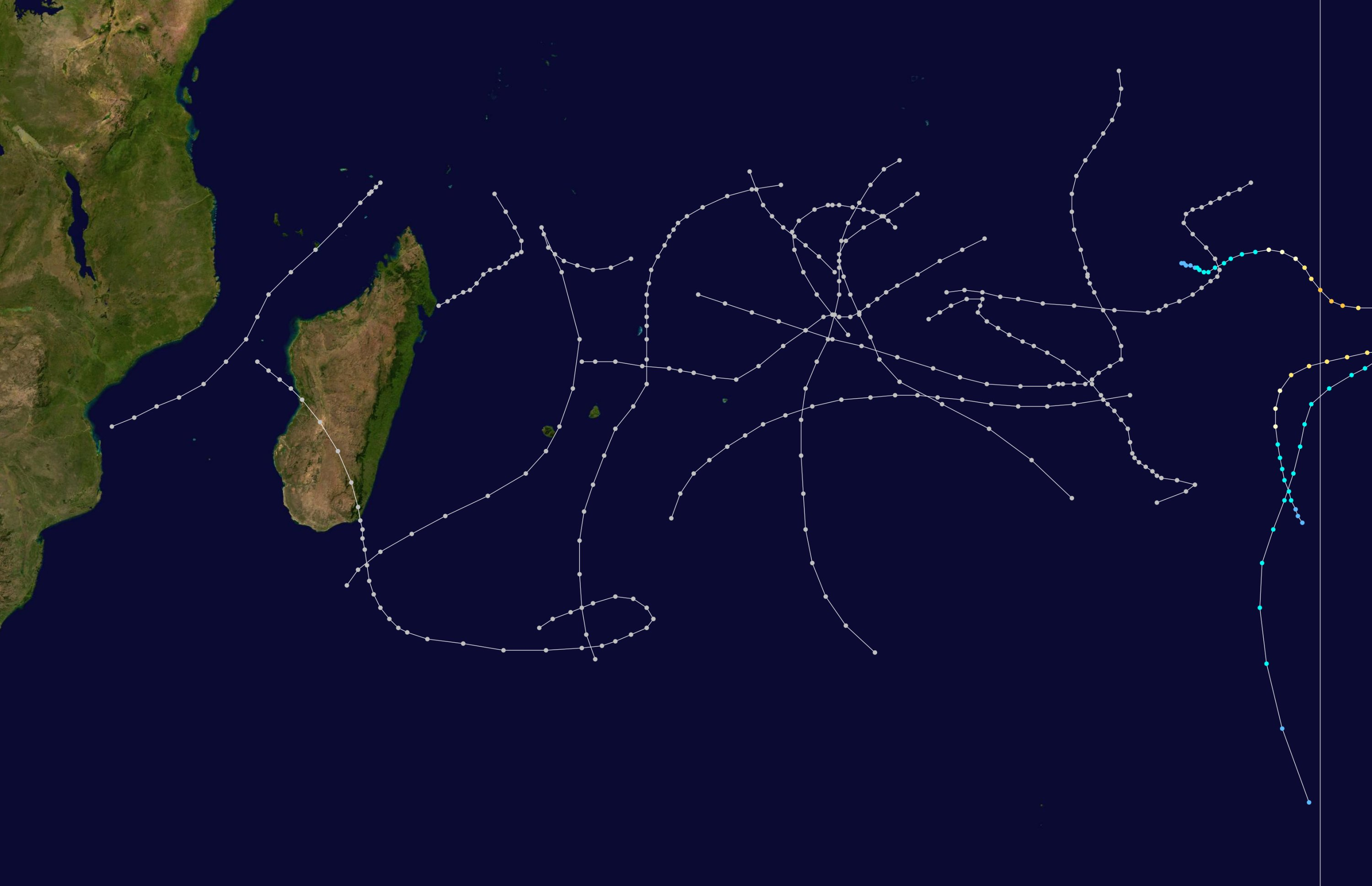
1977–78 South-West Indian Ocean cyclone season summary map

The January-June portion of the 1977–78 South-West Indian Ocean cyclone season produced seven tropical cyclones between January and March 1978, of which five became named tropical storms and three intensified into tropical cyclones. Activity began on January 16 with the formation of Tropical Cyclone Fleur and concluded on March 19 with the dissipation of Tropical Storm Marylou. The strongest storm of the period was Tropical Cyclone Fleur, which attained peak 1-minute sustained winds of 125 mph (200 km/h) and a minimum central pressure of 941 mbar (27.79 inHg). Tropical Storm Kiki was the only system to cause fatalities, killing two people on Réunion, while no storm caused any reported monetary damage. Overall, tropical cyclones during the period caused two deaths and no reported damage.

==== July-December ====
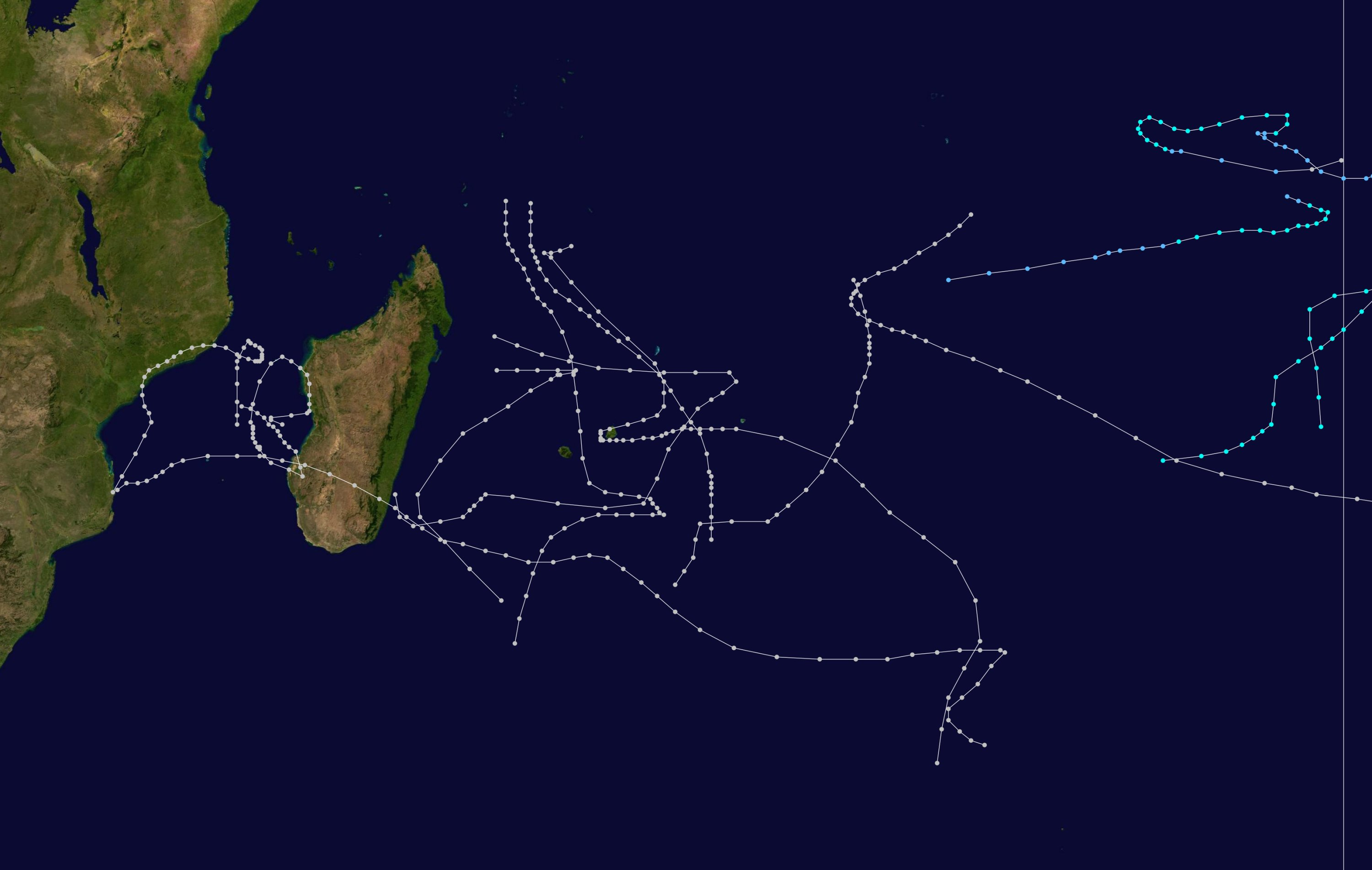
1978–79 South-West Indian Ocean cyclone season summary map

The July-December portion of the 1978–79 South-West Indian Ocean cyclone season featured two tropical cyclones between July and December 1978, one of which became a named storm. Activity began on December 13 with the formation of Cyclone Angele which impacted Madagascar and Mozambique as a slow-moving major, followed up by Tropical Storm 03S which crossed over from the Australian region and dissipated on December 26.

=== Australian Region ===
==== January–June ====
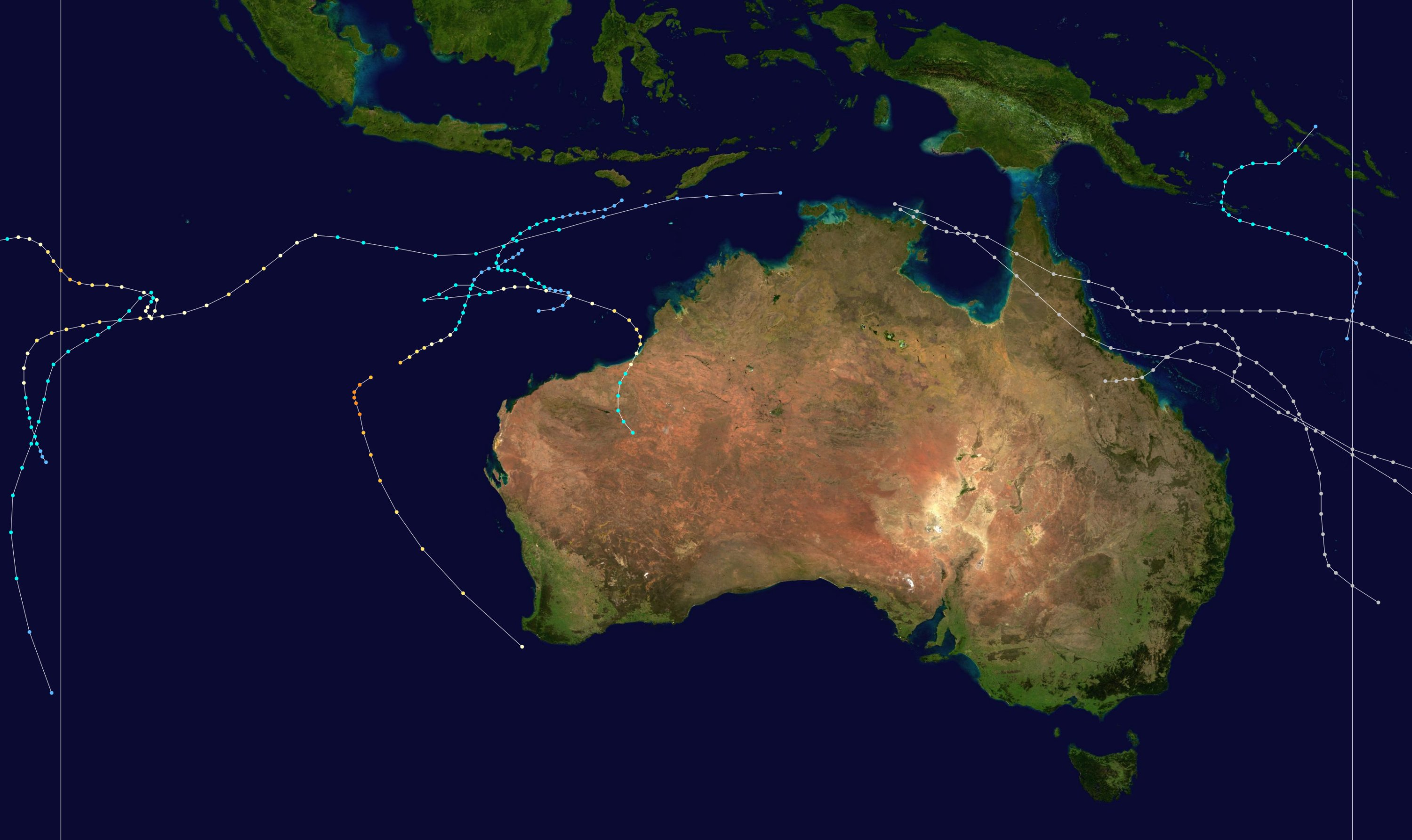
The track map of all tropical cyclones during the January–June portion of the 1977–78 Australian region cyclone season.

The January–June portion of the 1977–78 Australian region cyclone season was an above-average period that produced six tropical cyclones, of which all six became named storms and three intensified into severe tropical cyclones. Activity began on January 10 with the formation of Cyclone Trudy and concluded on April 11 with the crossover of Cyclone Hal into the South Pacific. The strongest storm during the period was Severe Tropical Cyclone Winnie, which attained peak 1-minute sustained winds of 125 mph (200 km/h) and a minimum central pressure of 945 mbar (27.91 inHg). The period's costliest storm was Cyclone Alby, which caused approximately US$45 million in damage and five fatalities after impacting Western Australia. Overall, tropical cyclones during the period caused at least seven deaths and approximately US$45 million in damage.

==== July–December ====
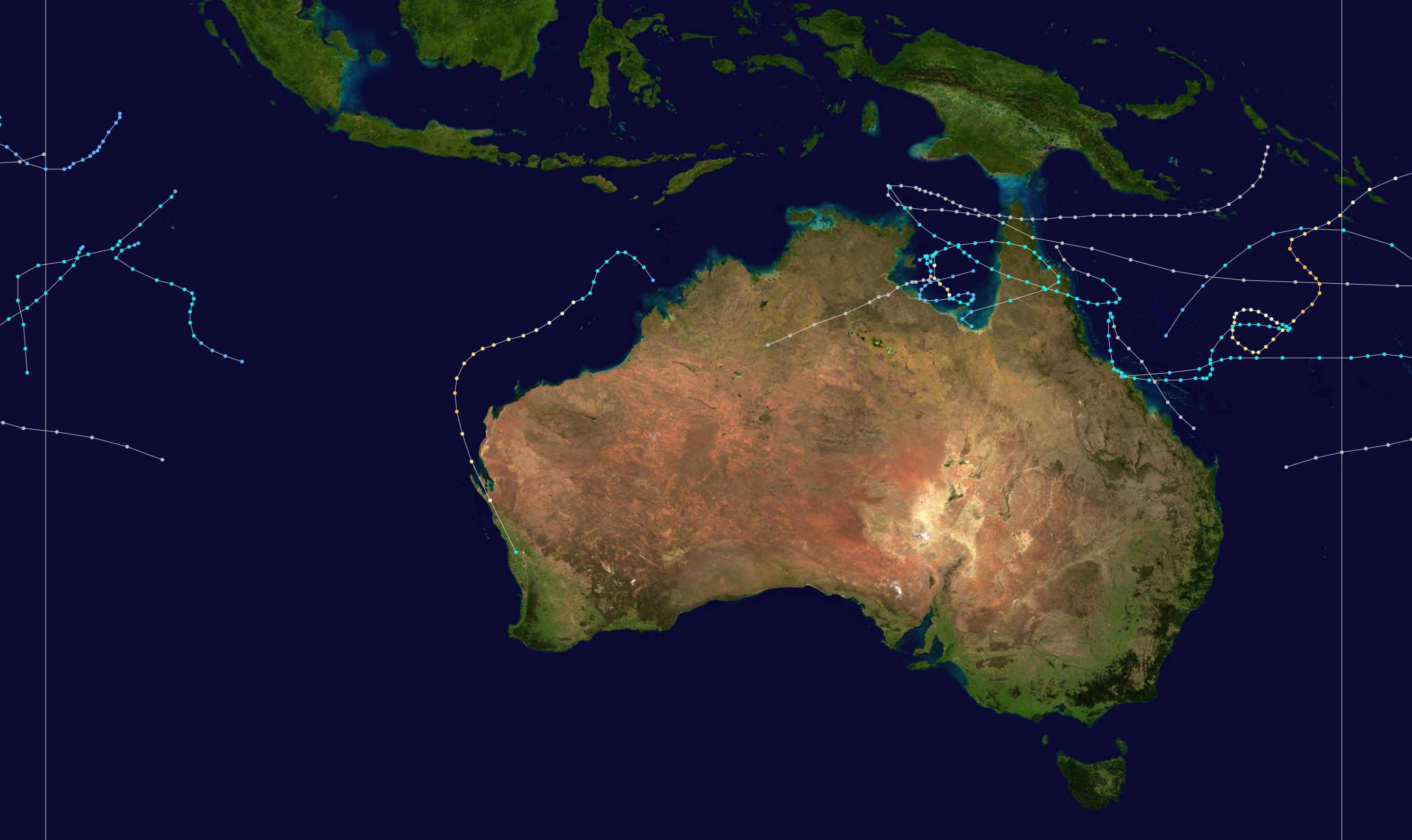
1978–79 Australian region cyclone season summary map

The July–December portion of the 1978–79 Australian region cyclone season produced three tropical cyclones, of which two became named storms and none intensified into a severe tropical cyclone. Activity began on November 19 with the formation of 01S and concluded on December 29 with the formation of Cyclone Peter, which remained active into January 1979. The strongest storm during the period was Cyclone Peter, which attained peak 1-minute sustained winds of 90 mph (145 km/h) and a minimum central pressure of 980 mbar (28.94 inHg). Peter was also the period's costliest and deadliest storm, causing approximately US$10 million in damage and two fatalities across Far North Queensland and Arnhem Land. Overall, tropical cyclones during the period caused two deaths and approximately US$10 million in damage.

=== South Pacific Ocean ===
==== January–June ====
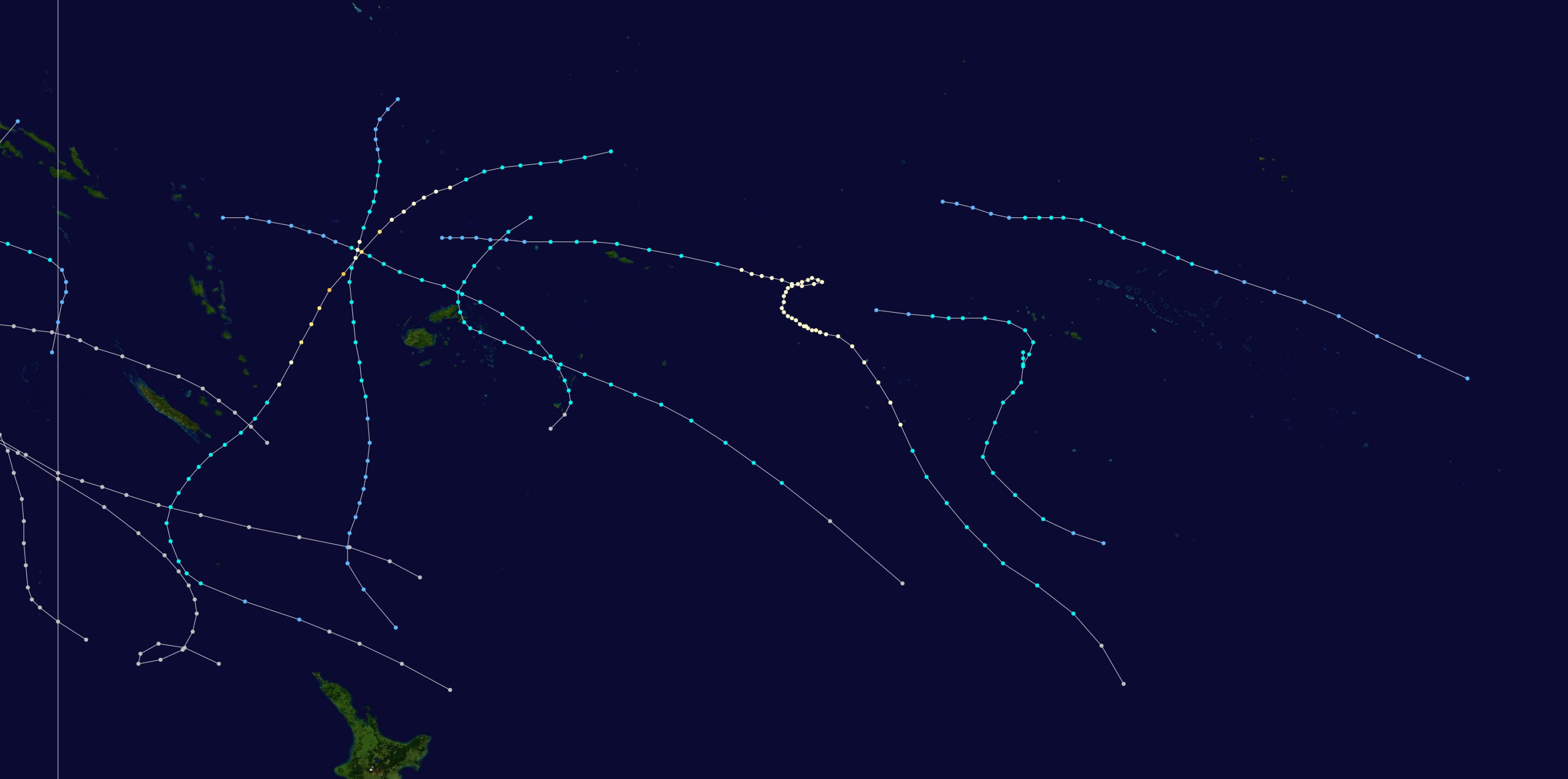
1977–78 South Pacific cyclone season summary map

The January–June portion of the 1977–78 South Pacific cyclone season was an above-average period that produced five tropical cyclones, all of which became named tropical cyclones. Activity began with Cyclone Bob, which entered the basin from the previous season, while the final system, Cyclone Hal, crossed into the basin from the Australian region before dissipating on April 22. The strongest storm during the period was Cyclone Hal, which attained peak 1-minute sustained winds of 85 mph (135 km/h) and a minimum central pressure of 965 mbar (28.50 inHg). None of the cyclones caused any confirmed fatalities, although Hal produced damage of unknown extent after affecting New Zealand. Overall, tropical cyclones during the period caused no confirmed fatalities and no reported monetary damage.

==== July–December ====
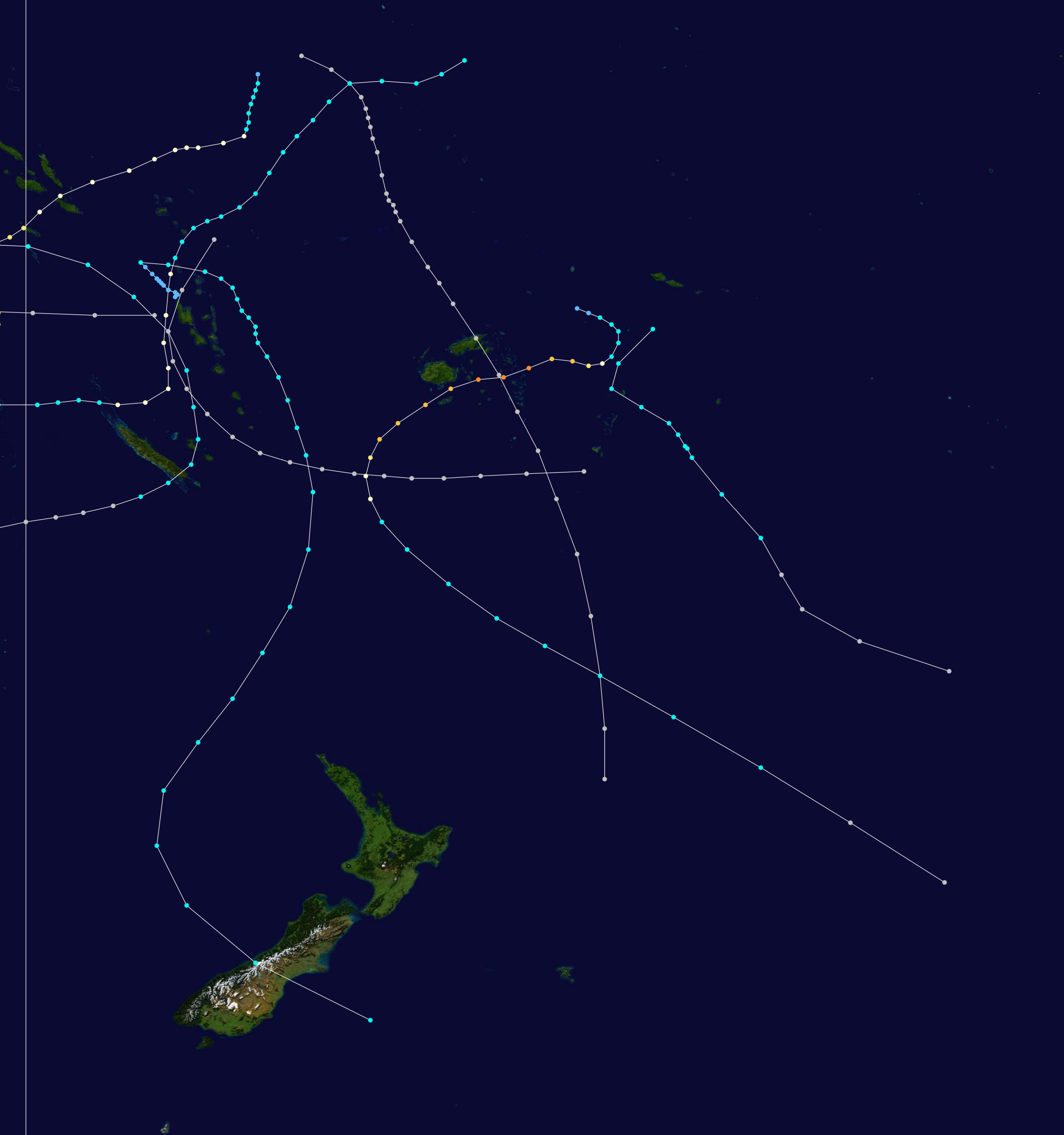
1978–79 South Pacific cyclone season summary map

The July–December portion of the 1978–79 South Pacific cyclone season produced only one tropical cyclone, which became a named storm. Activity began at the end of the year on December 27 with the formation of Tropical Cyclone Fay, which remained active into January 1979. Fay attained peak 1-minute sustained winds of 65 mph (105 km/h) and a minimum central pressure of 980 mbar (28.94 inHg). The cyclone affected Fiji, where it caused damage of unknown extent and an unknown number of fatalities. Overall, tropical cyclones during the period caused no confirmed fatalities and no reported monetary damage.

== Systems ==
=== January ===
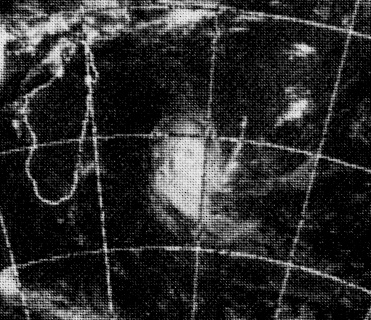
Cyclone Fleur

The first month of the year saw seven tropical or subtropical cyclones forming with six of them being named, as well as featuring three crossover storm from the previous year, Mary in the Western Pacific, Esther in the South-West Indian Ocean, and Bob in the South Pacific. The only unnamed storm was a subtropical storm in the North Atlantic that dissipated on the 23rd. The 1978 Pacific Typhoon season started rather early with Tropical Storm Nadine forming early in the month. Moderate Tropical Storm Huberte passed east of Rodrigues without causing any reported damage. Later in the month, Cyclone Vern struck Australia in late January causing minor damage. The strongest storm of the month was Cyclone Fleur that peaked as a strong Category 3 with 1-minute sustained winds of 125 mph (200 km/h).

Tropical cyclones formed in January 1978
Storm name	Dates active	Max wind km/h (mph)	Pressure (hPa)	Areas affected	Damage (USD)	Deaths	Refs
Nadine	January 6–13	30 (50)	970	None	None	None	
Trudy	January 10–20	180 (110)	954	Indonesia	Unknown	None	
Fleur	January 16–23	200 (125)	941	Mauritius	Unknown	None	
One-L	January 18–23	75 (45)	1002	None	None	None	
Huberte	January 26–February 1	100 (65)	991	Rodrigues	Unknown	None	
Vern	January 27–February 3	130 (80)	964	Australia	>US$57,000	None	
Georgia	January 27–February 5	100 (65)	991	Madagascar	Unknown	None	

=== February ===
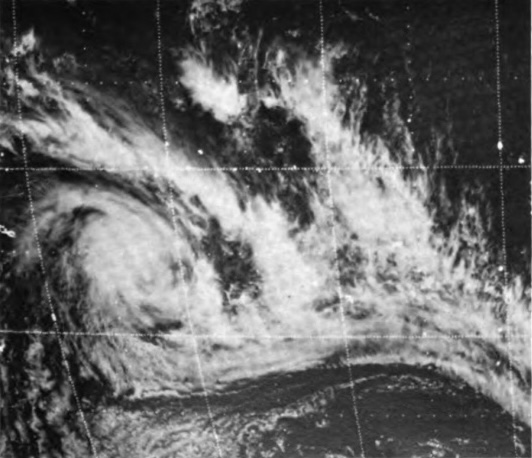
Cyclone Charles

February was slightly inactive, with only six tropical cyclones forming in the month, all being named. The strongest storm of February was Cyclone Charles in the South Pacific that peaked out to sea. This month also featured cyclones Diana and Ernie which formed in tandem in the South Pacific. Severe Tropical Storm Irena grazed northwestern Madagascar during the early-mid portions of February causing an unknown amount of damage, followed by Moderate Tropical Storm Jacqueline which took an erratic path in the open Southern Indian Ocean, dissipating in late February. At the end of the month, Cyclone Gwen formed in the Gulf of Carpentaria shortly before making landfall in the Cape York peninsula and emerging into the South Pacific basin.

Tropical cyclones formed in February 1978
Storm name	Dates active	Max wind km/h (mph)	Pressure (hPa)	Areas affected	Damage (USD)	Deaths	Refs
Irena	February 7–14	135 (75)	976	None	Unknown	None	
Jacqueline	February 12–21	65 (40)	991	None	None	None	
Charles	February 13–March 1	155 (100)	945	None	None	None	
Diana	February 15–22	100 (65)	980	French Polynesia	None	None	
Ernie	February 17–23	100 (65)	980	Fiji	None	None	
Gwen	February 25–27	95 (60)	987	Cape York peninsula	Unknown	None	

=== March ===
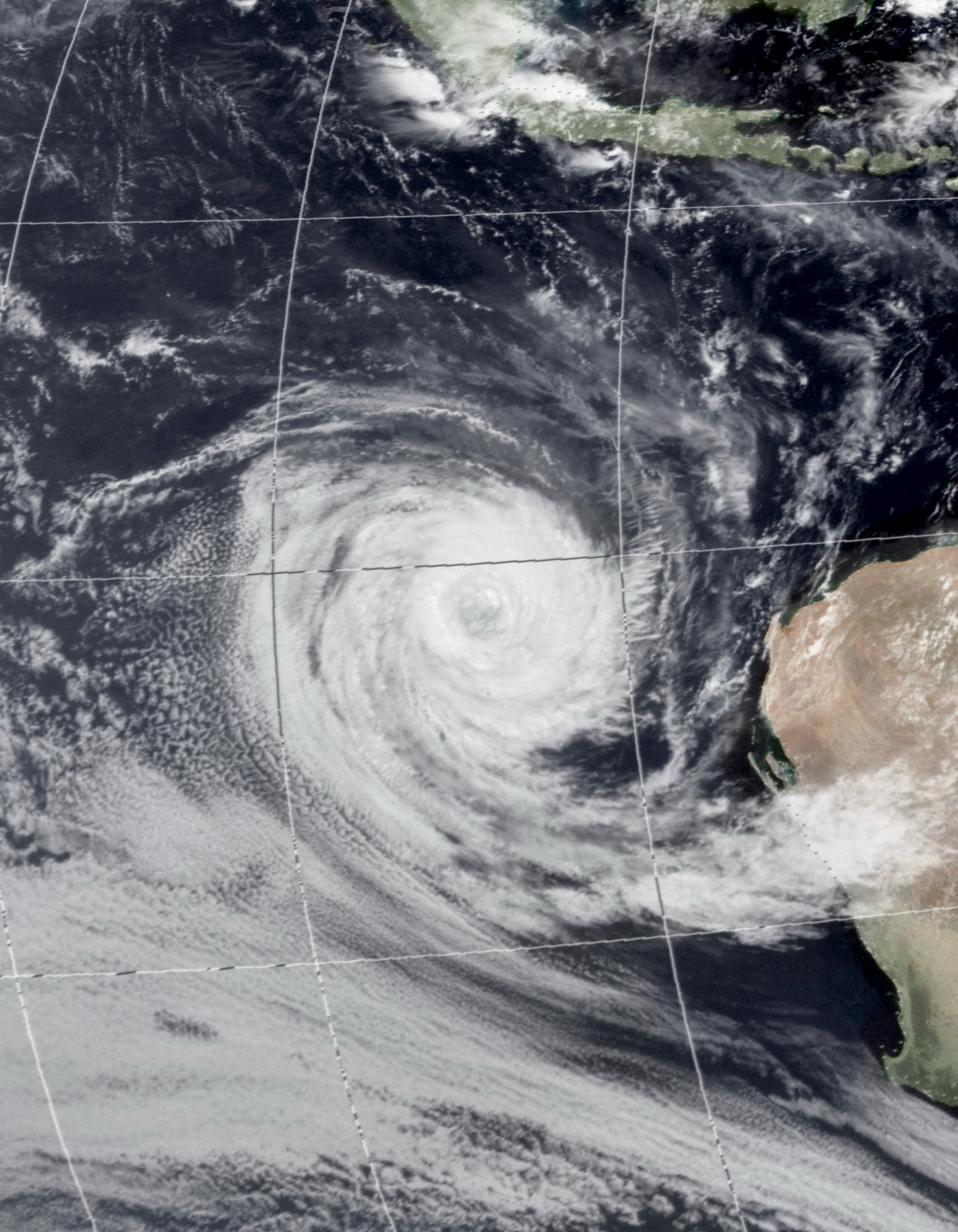
Cyclone Alby

Like the previous month, March was slightly inactive with only six tropical cyclones forming, all being named. The strongest storm this month was Cyclone Alby which struck Western Australia, being regarded as the most devastating tropical cyclone to ever strike southwestern Western Australia. Other storms that formed this month include Cyclone Winnie, another major in the open Southern Indian Ocean, Tropical Storm Kiki earlier in the month that grazed Réunion, killing two people. Cyclone Nadine and tropical storm’s Lucie and Marylou stayed out to sea during the middle of March.

Tropical cyclones formed in March 1978
Storm name	Dates active	Max wind km/h (mph)	Pressure (hPa)	Areas affected	Damage (USD)	Deaths	Refs
Kiki	March 4–12	85 (50)	992	Réunion	None	2	
Lucie	March 14–18	55 (35)	1000	None	None	None	
Winnie	March 16–28	200 (125)	945	None	None	None	
Marylou	March 15–19	100 (65)	994	None	None	None	
Nadine	March 18–23	85 (50)	994	None	None	None	
Alby	March 27–April 5	215 (130)	930	Western Australia	US$45 million	5	

=== April ===
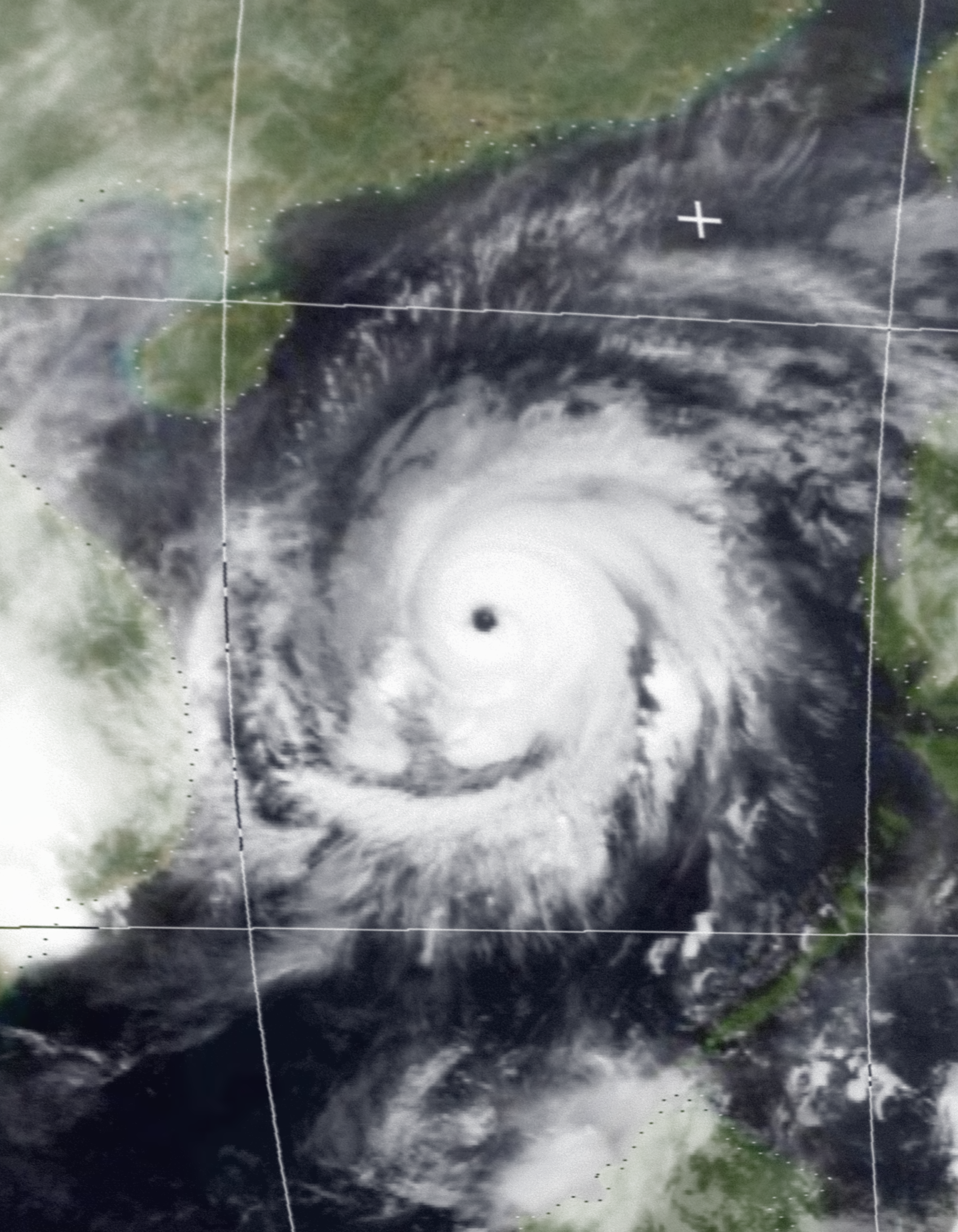
Typhoon Olive

April was another inactive month, with only three tropical cyclones forming, all of them being named. The month started with tropical storm’s Brenda and Hal forming in the Australian region, the latter went on to become a Category 1-equivalent cyclone after crossing into the South Pacific before making landfall in New Zealand. Brenda slowly meandered offshore northwest Australia before ultimately dissipating mid-month. The strongest storm of the month was Typhoon Olive that struck portions of the Philippines before intensifying into a rare early-season South China Sea typhoon, it was also a deadly storm as at least 66 people were confirmed to have died from the storm, mostly in the Philippines.

Tropical cyclones formed in April 1978
Storm name	Dates active	Max wind km/h (mph)	Pressure (hPa)	Areas affected	Damage (USD)	Deaths	Refs
Brenda	April 5–14	95 (60)	990	None	None	None	
Hal	April 4–22	140 (85)	965	Cape York Peninsula, New Zealand	Unknown	Unknown	
Olive	April 15–May 1	160 (100)	955	Philippines, Hong Kong, Taiwan	US$32.2 million	66	

=== May ===
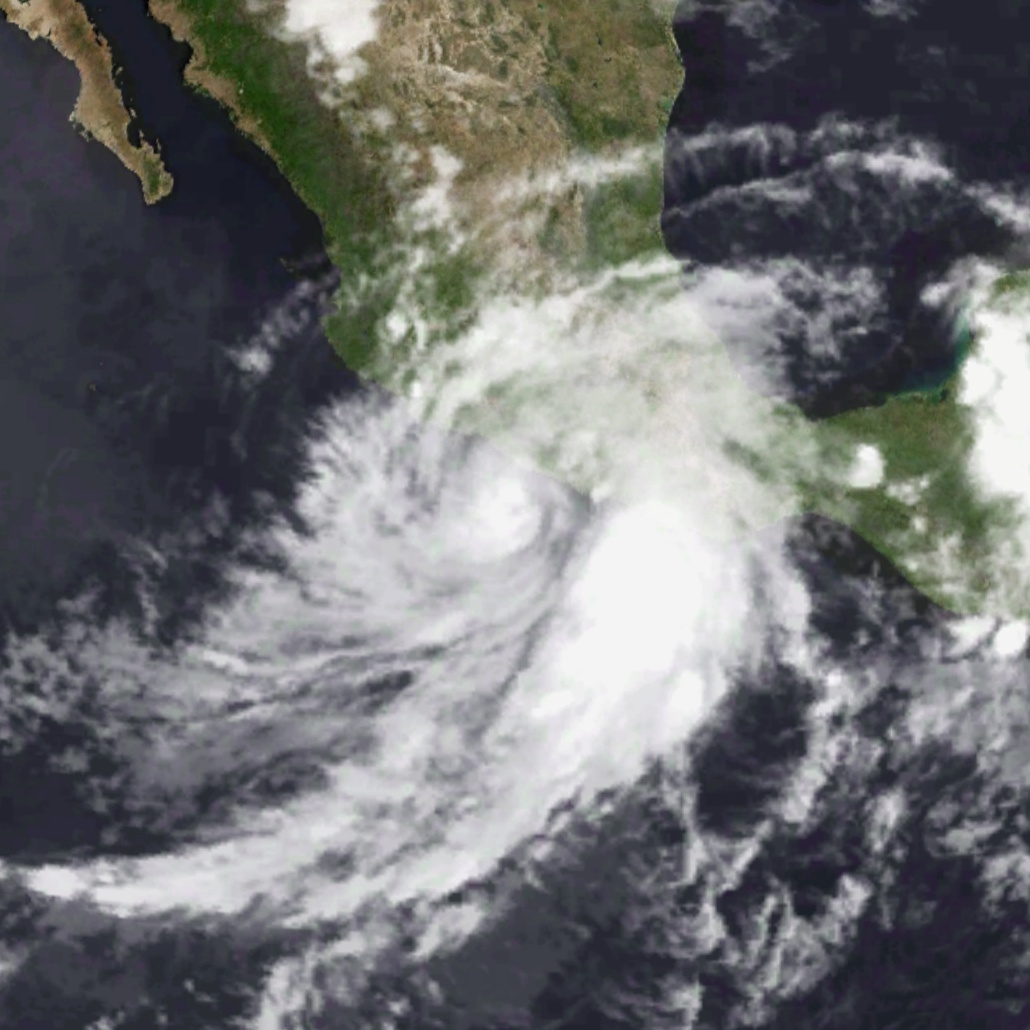
Hurricane Aletta

May of 1978 was one of the least active May’s on record for tropical cyclogenesis occurrence worldwide with only two nameable tropical cyclones forming. Both Very Severe Cyclonic Storm BOB 01 and Hurricane Aletta were the first tropical cyclones to form in their respective seasons. BOB 01 made landfall in Myanmar near mid-month causing an unknown amount of damage whilst Aletta made landfall in Mexico on the last day of the month as a weakening tropical storm with no damage being reported.

Tropical cyclones formed in May 1978
Storm name	Dates active	Max wind km/h (mph)	Pressure (hPa)	Areas affected	Damage (USD)	Deaths	Refs
BOB 01	May 14–17	110 (70)	964	Bangladesh, Myanmar	Unknown	Unknown	
Aletta	May 30–31	120 (75)	Unknown	Mexico	None	None	

=== June ===
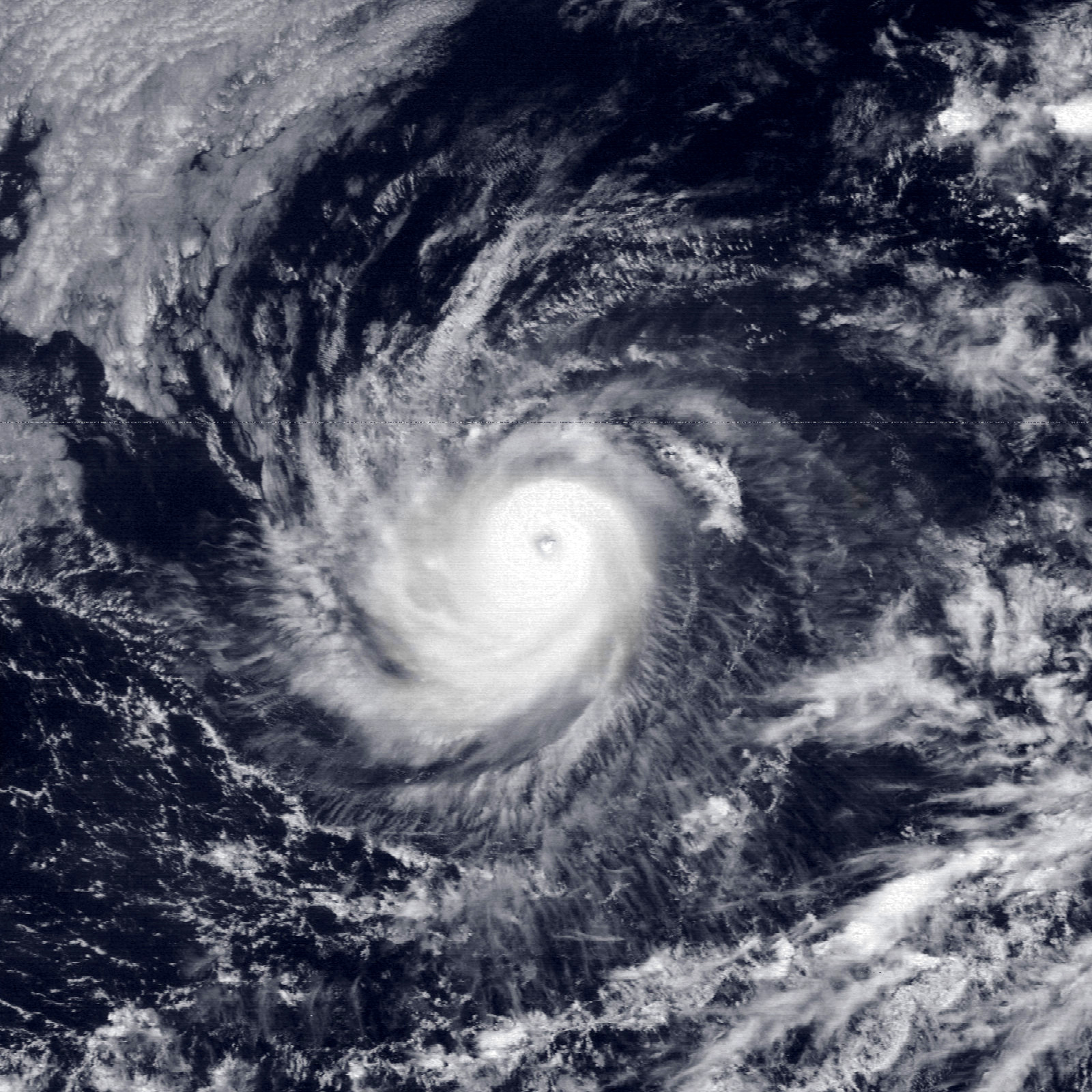
Hurricane Carlotta

June was a much more active month compared to the previous months, featuring thirteen tropical cyclones forming as six organized into nameable storms. The first three storms of the month were classified only by the Japan Meteorological Agency (JMA) followed up by Polly that impacted the Ryukyu Islands and Japan. Bud and Carlotta were both simultaneously active, the latter becoming the strongest storm of the month peaking as a Category 4 hurricane in the Eastern Pacific out at sea. The month concluded with weaker systems as a weak tropical depression formed in the Gulf of Mexico, Tropical Storm Rose struck the Philippines and Taiwan, Hurricane Daniel peaked out to sea in the Eastern Pacific as a Category 3 hurricane, Tropical Storm Shirley struck Southeast Asia, and a tropical depression formed at the end of the month in the Eastern Pacific before dissipating shortly into July.

Tropical cyclones formed in June 1978
Storm name	Dates active	Max wind km/h (mph)	Pressure (hPa)	Areas affected	Damage (USD)	Deaths	Refs
TD	June 7	Unknown	1004	Philippines	None	None	
TD	June 10	Unknown	1008	Philippines	None	None	
TD	June 12–13	Unknown	1004	Philippines	None	None	
Polly	June 13–24	95 (60)	985	Ryukyu Islands, Japan	None	None	
BOB 02	June 16–17	Unknown	Unknown	Unknown	Unknown	Unknown	
Bud	June 17–20	95 (60)	Unknown	None	None	None	
Carlotta	June 17–25	210 (130)	Unknown	None	None	None	
Two-L	June 21–22	50 (30)	Unknown	None	None	None	
Rose	June 21–25	95 (60)	990	Philippines, Taiwan	None	None	
LAND 01	June 26–27	Unknown	Unknown	Unknown	Unknown	Unknown	
Daniel	June 26–July 3	185 (115)	Unknown	None	None	None	
Shirley	June 26–July 2	80 (50)	992	Philippines, Vietnam, Cambodia	Unknown	None	
Five-E	June 30–July 2	50 (30)	Unknown	None	None	None	

=== July ===
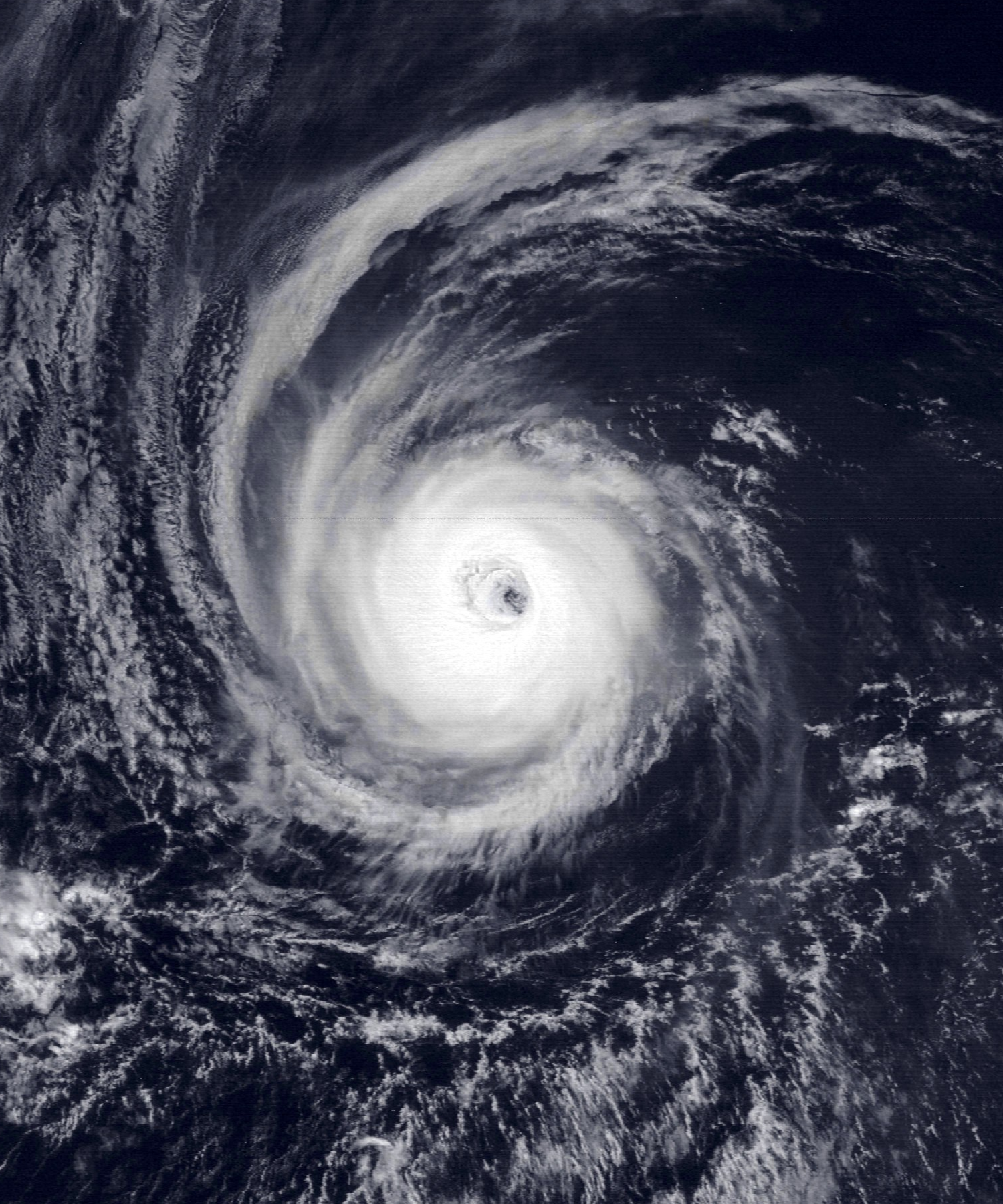
Hurricane Fico

July was above average in activity, featuring fifteen tropical cyclones forming with nine being named from them. The month started off strongly with Tropical Storm Emilia and Hurricane Fico, the latter becoming the longest-lived storm of the year as it crossed over from the Eastern to Central Pacific peaking as a moderate Category 4 hurricane, at the time Fico was the longest-duration hurricane and furthest-traveled hurricane on record in the Central Pacific. Following this, multiple storms across all northern hemisphere basins formed in succession as a strong tropical depression moved over the North Atlantic main development region before dissipating, Typhoon Trix went on to affect Japan, BOB 03 and ARB 01 were both simultaneously active in the North Indian Ocean, and Hurricane Gilma and Hector intensified into the Eastern Pacific’s next major hurricanes, strengthening to Category 3 and 4 respectively. The latter half of the month featured a trio of active storms in the Western Pacific as Tropical Storm Agnes, Typhoon Wendy, and Typhoon Virginia co-existed at once, the latter two persisting into August. At the end of the month, Tropical Storm Amelia formed in the Bay of Campeche, being the first named storm of the Atlantic hurricane season before making landfall in Texas, it later became the most destructive tropical cyclone of the month as catastrophic flooding took the lives of 33 people across Texas.

Tropical cyclones formed in July 1978
Storm name	Dates active	Max wind km/h (mph)	Pressure (hPa)	Areas affected	Damage (USD)	Deaths	Refs
Emilia	July 6–10	105 (65)	Unknown	None	None	None	
TD	July 6–11	Unknown	1004	Japan	None	None	
Fico	July 9–31	225 (140)	≤955	Hawaii, Aleutian Islands	US$200,000	None	
Three-L	July 10–12	55 (35)	Unknown	None	None	None	
Trix	July 11–25	145 (90)	965	Ryukyu Islands, China	Unknown	Unknown	
BOB 03	July 11–14	Unknown	Unknown	Unknown	Unknown	Unknown	
ARB 01	July 11–13	Unknown	Unknown	Unknown	Unknown	Unknown	
Gilma	July 13–20	185 (115)	Unknown	None	None	None	
TD	July 16	Unknown	1000	None	None	None	
Hector	July 22–29	225 (140)	955	None	None	None	
Wendy	July 22–August 8	145 (90)	960	Ryukyu Islands, Japan	None	None	
Virginia	July 22–August 4	130 (80)	974	Japan	None	None	
Agnes	July 22–31	105 (65)	980	South China	None	3	
Amelia	July 30–August 1	80 (50)	1005	Texas	US$110 million	33	
TD	July 31	Unknown	1004	None	None	None	

=== August ===
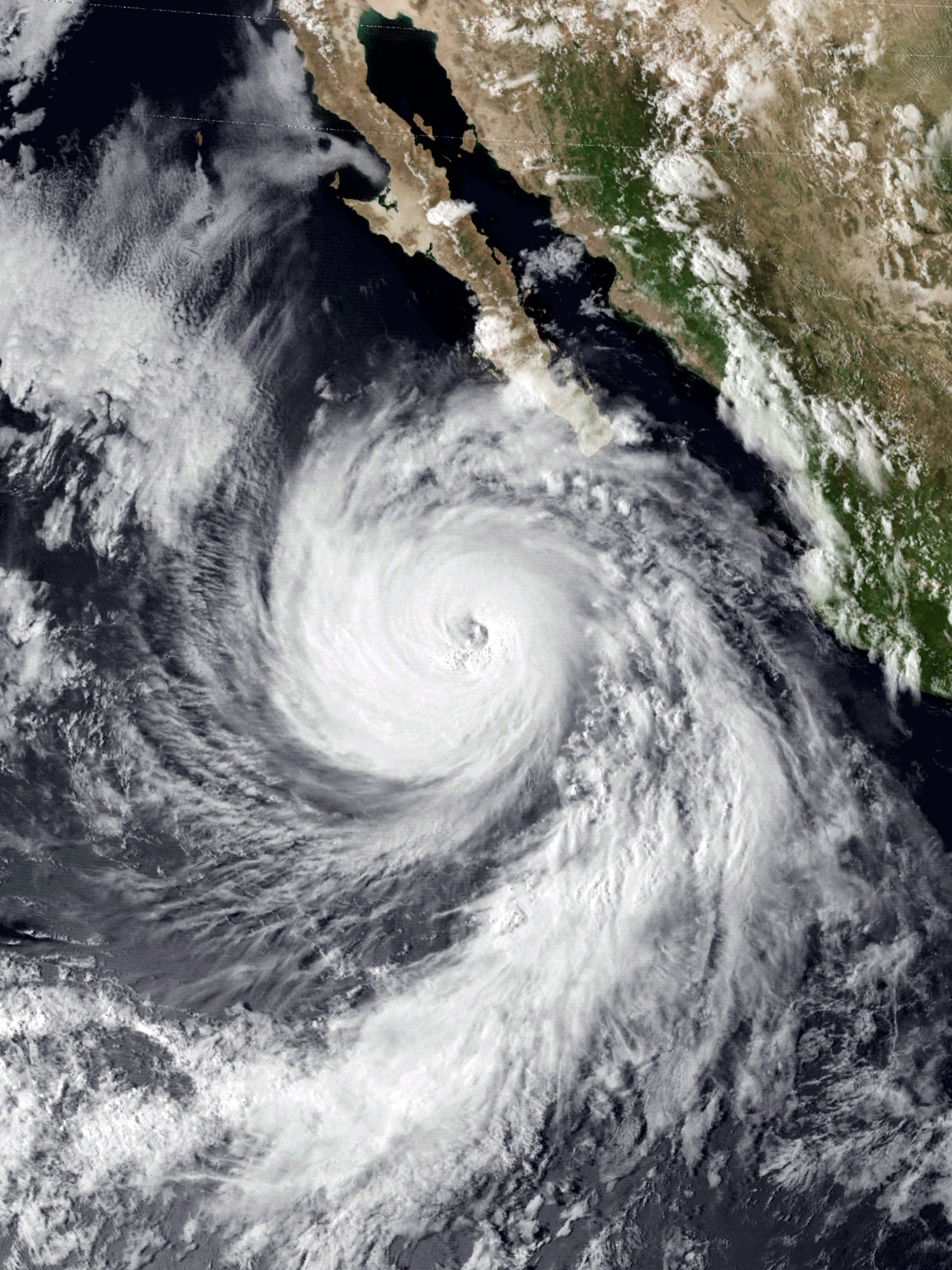
Hurricane Norman

August was an extremely active month in terms of the amount of tropical cyclones that formed, featuring a total of 34 tropical cyclones with seventeen of them being named, excluding the storms named by PAGASA, being Gedang, Oyang and Loleng. The month started off with western hemisphere activity alongside the formations of Bess, Ten-E, and Hurricane Cora, the latter becoming the first hurricane of the Atlantic hurricane season. The Western Pacific followed up with the formations of Bonnie, Carmen, and Della. In late August, multiple strong storms formed during this period with hurricane’s John, Kristy, and Miriam, typhoon’s Elaine and Faye, and Category 4 hurricane’s Ella and Norman. Hurricane Norman was the strongest and most destructive storm of the month after its remnants plowed through Southern California producing locally heavy rainfall.

Tropical cyclones formed in August 1978
Storm name	Dates active	Max wind km/h (mph)	Pressure (hPa)	Areas affected	Damage (USD)	Deaths	Refs
TD	August 4–5	Unknown	1002	Taiwan	None	None	
Gading	August 4–8	55 (35)	1000	Taiwan	None	None	
Bess	August 5–8	80 (50)	1005	Veracruz, Mexico	None	None	
Ten-E	August 6–9	55 (35)	Unknown	Hawaiian Islands	None	None	
Cora	August 7–12	145 (90)	980	Grenada, Maine	Minimal	1	
Four-L	August 7–11	55 (35)	1008	Bequia, Nicaragua	None	None	
Unnumbered	August 9–10	50 (30)	1015	Louisiana	None	None	
Bonnie	August 9–13	95 (60)	983	South China, Vietnam	None	None	
Carmen	August 9–20	145 (90)	960	Ryukyu Islands, East China, Korea	US$3 million	21	
Della	August 9–13	95 (60)	985	Philippines, Taiwan, China	None	None	
Iva	August 11–15	120 (75)	Unknown	Hawaiian Islands	None	None	
Loleng	August 13–17	55 (35)	1000	Philippines, South China	None	None	
BOB 04	August 13–17	Unknown	Unknown	Unknown	Unknown	Unknown	
TD	August 14	Unknown	1002	Taiwan	None	None	
13W	August 14–21	70 (45)	998	Japan	None	None	
TD	August 18–19	Unknown	1004	Palau	None	None	
John	August 18–30	170 (105)	Unknown	None	None	None	
Kristy	August 18–28	170 (105)	Unknown	None	None	None	
Lane	August 19–24	80 (50)	Unknown	None	None	None	
TD	August 20	Unknown	1002	Taiwan	None	None	
Elaine	August 21–29	130 (80)	965	Philippines, South China	Minor	1	
TD	August 22–24	Unknown	1008	Korean Peninsula	None	None	
Miriam	August 23–September 2	145 (90)	Unknown	None	None	None	
TD	August 26	Unknown	1008	Ryukyu Islands	None	None	
Debra	August 26–29	95 (60)	1000	Southern United States, Midwestern United States, Mid-Atlantic states, New England	Minor	2	
BOB 05	August 26–September 2	Unknown	Unknown	Unknown	Unknown	Unknown	
Faye	August 27–September 10	195 (120)	935	Mariana Islands	None	None	
Gloria	August 27–31	80 (50)	990	Ryukyu Islands	None	None	
Hester	August 28–September 1	95 (60)	990	Japan	None	None	
Oyang	August 29–30	50 (30)	Unknown	Philippines	None	None	
Ella	August 30–September 5	225 (140)	956	East Coast of the United States, Atlantic Canada	None	None	
Unnumbered	August 30–September 1	55 (35)	1013	None	None	None	
Norman	August 30–September 7	225 (140)	955	California	>US$300 million	8	
TD	August 31–September 2	Unknown	1002	None	None	None	

=== September ===
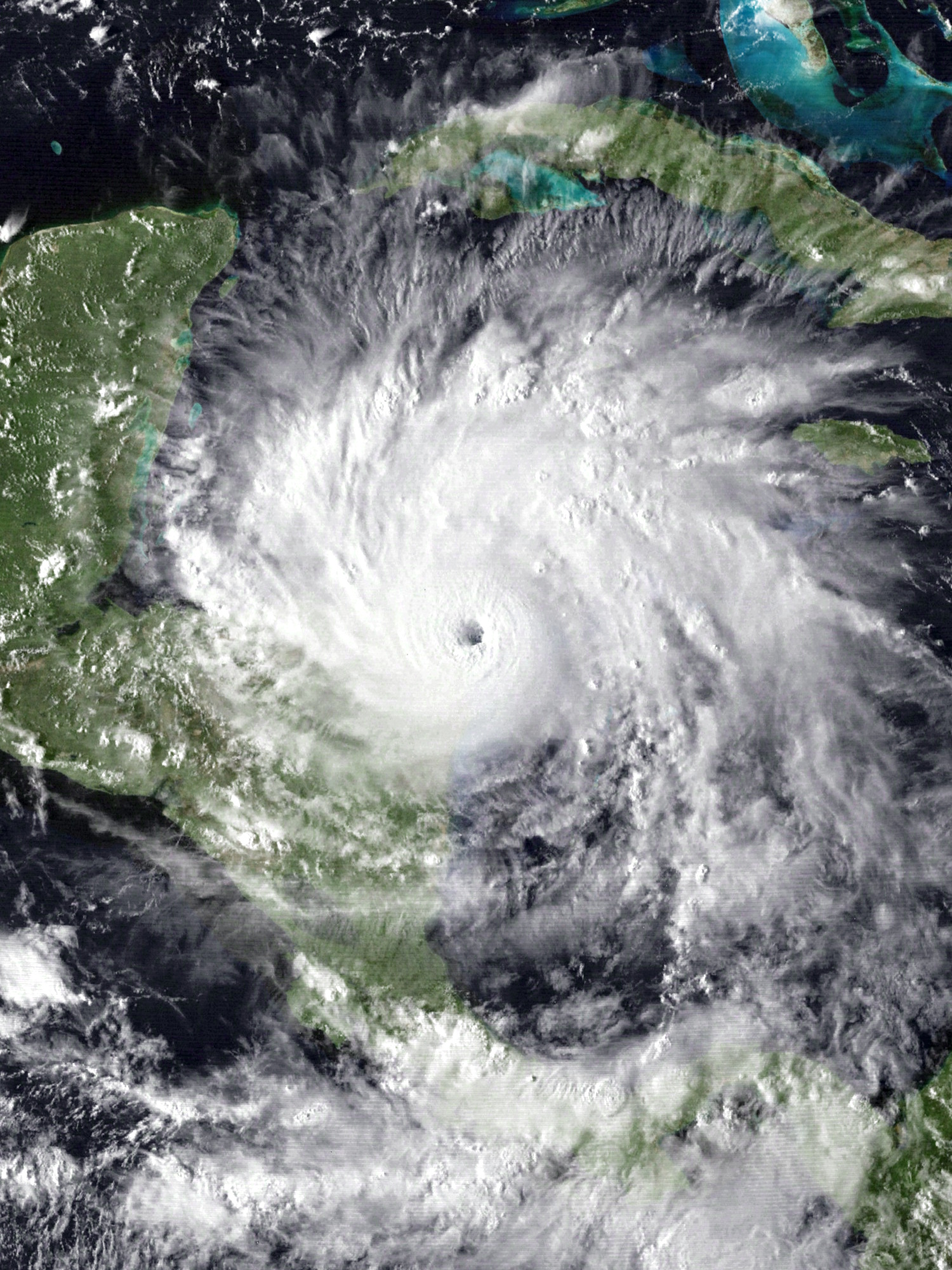
Hurricane Greta

September followed up the previous by becoming another active month, out of the 26 tropical cyclones that formed this month, only ten were named. This excludes the tropical depressions that were unofficially named by PAGASA in September, being Pasing, Susang, and Tering. The strongest storm of the month was Hurricane Greta which made landfall in Honduras at peak intensity as a Category 4 hurricane before crossing into the Eastern Pacific and being renamed to Olivia. Other notable storms in September included Hurricane Flossie and Typhoon Judy which peaked as Category 2-equivalent storms out to sea. Typhoon Irma was the deadliest storm of the month, killing six people in Japan. Followed by Kit and Lola which both struck Southeast Asia consecutively later in the month.

Tropical cyclones formed in September 1978
Storm name	Dates active	Max wind km/h (mph)	Pressure (hPa)	Areas affected	Damage (USD)	Deaths	Refs
LAND 02	September 1–5	Unknown	Unknown	Unknown	Unknown	Unknown	
TD	September 2–7	Unknown	1002	Taiwan, Ryukyu Islands	None	None	
Eight-L	September 3–11	55 (35)	1009	None	None	None	
Flossie	September 4–15	160 (100)	976	None	None	None	
Nine-L	September 8–10	55 (35)	1003	Tamaulipas	None	None	
Seventeen-E	September 8–9	50 (30)	Unknown	None	None	None	
Irma	September 9–15	120 (75)	970	Taiwan, Ryukyu Islands, Japan	None	6	
Pasing	September 9–15	55 (35)	1004	Vietnam	None	None	
Judy	September 9–17	170 (105)	950	None	None	None	
TD	September 10–11	55 (35)	1006	Taiwan	None	None	
Hope	September 11–21	105 (65)	987	None	None	None	
Greta	September 13–20	210 (130)	947	Netherlands Antilles, Honduras,Belize, Mexico	US$25 million	5	
Susang	September 13–19	55 (35)	1000	Palau, Philippines, Vietnam	None	None	
BOB 06	September 15–16	Unknown	Unknown	Unknown	Unknown	Unknown	
TD	September 17	Unknown	1008	Palau	None	None	
Twelve-L	September 18–29	55 (35)	1008	None	None	None	
Olivia	September 20–23	120 (75)	Unknown	Chiapas	None	None	
Kit	September 20–28	115 (70)	980	Philippines, South China, Vietnam	Unknown	Unknown	
Unnumbered	September 21–23	55 (35)	1001	Veracruz	None	None	
BOB 07	September 21	Unknown	Unknown	Unknown	Unknown	Unknown	
Tering	September 21–22	55 (35)	998	Philippines	None	None	
TD	September 21–22	Unknown	1008	Ryukyu Islands	None	None	
Paul	September 23–27	70 (45)	Unknown	Northern Mexico	None	None	
Lola	September 24–October 5	145 (90)	965	Philippines, South China	Unknown	Unknown	
LAND 03	September 26–30	Unknown	Unknown	Unknown	Unknown	Unknown	
Mamie	September 30–October 5	130 (80)	960	None	None	None	

=== October ===
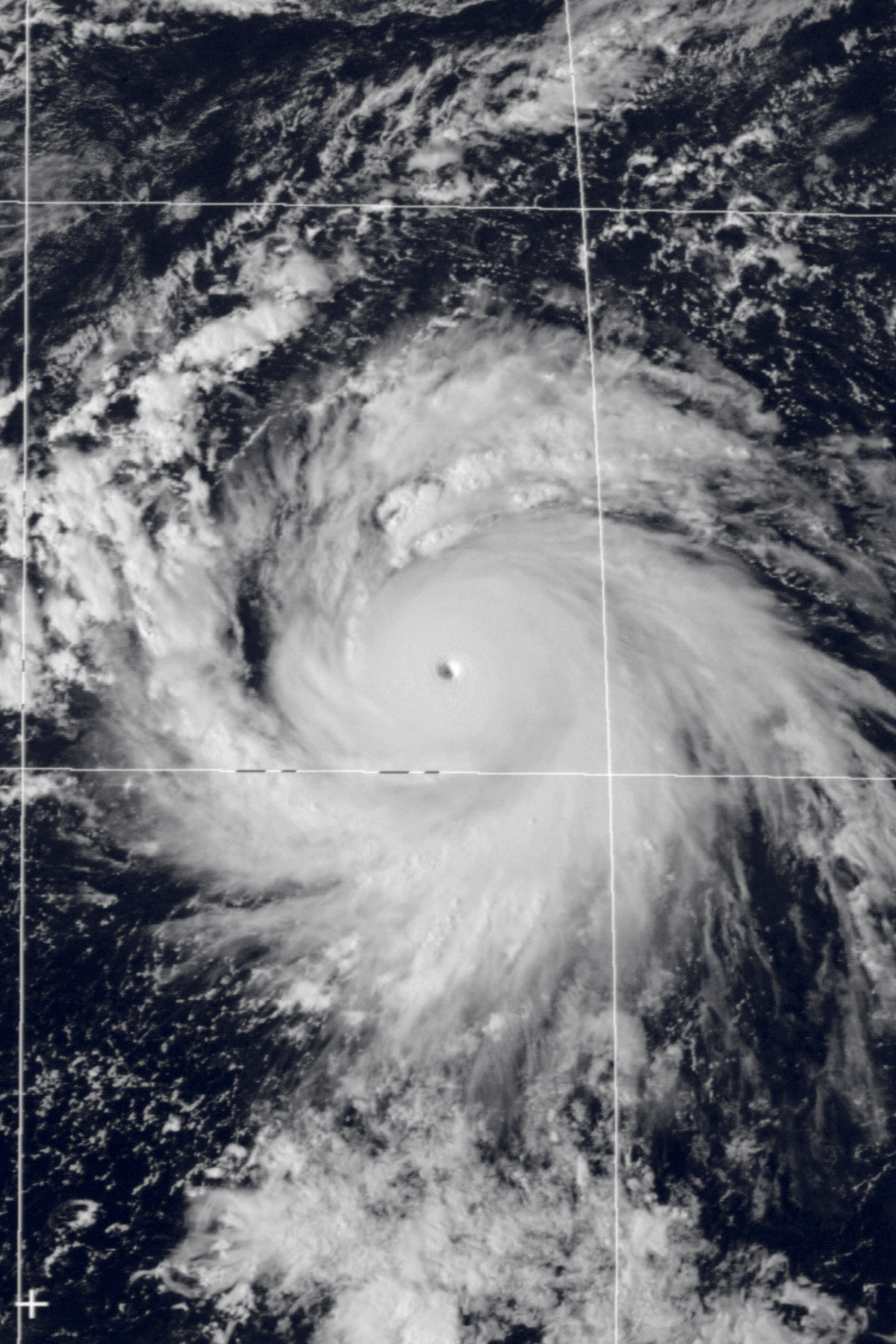
Typhoon Rita

October was slightly less active than the previous two months, featuring nineteen tropical cyclones that formed this month with ten of them being named, excluding the PAGASA-named Bidang which was tagged as 26W by the JTWC. Early October featured Tropical Storm Nina, a long-lived Western Pacific storm that went on to impact Vietnam and China, killing 59 people. Ora and Phyllis were late season Category 2-equivalent typhoons that both did not cause any reported damage, the latter staying out to sea. The month concluded with dual Pacific storms Sergio and Susan, the latter becoming a Category 4 hurricane in the Central Pacific. Hurricane Kendra, with its precursor stages causing flooding and damage in Puerto Rico that led to the death of one person. And Typhoon Rita which not only became the strongest storm of the month, but the strongest storm of the year as it peaked with a minimum central pressure of 878 mbar (25.93 inHg), the seventh-lowest ever recorded globally. Rita went on to make landfall in Luzon at Category 4 intensity, causing catastrophic damage that killed at least 444 people in the Philippines.

Tropical cyclones formed in October 1978
Storm name	Dates active	Max wind km/h (mph)	Pressure (hPa)	Areas affected	Damage (USD)	Deaths	Refs
Irma	October 2–5	80 (50)	998	Azores	None	None	
BOB 08	October 2–6	Unknown	Unknown	Unknown	Unknown	Unknown	
Rosa	October 2–7	135 (85)	Unknown	None	None	None	
TD	October 5	Unknown	1004	None	None	None	
Nina	October 5–17	115 (70)	975	Philippines, South China, Vietnam	Unknown	59	
Juliet	October 7–11	80 (50)	1006	Puerto Rico, Bermuda	None	None	
Ora	October 8–15	170 (105)	940	Taiwan, Ryukyu Islands	None	None	
25W	October 11–14	55 (35)	1000	None	None	None	
Bidang	October 11–17	55 (35)	1004	Caroline Islands, Philippines	None	None	
Unnumbered	October 13–17	55 (35)	992	None	None	None	
Phyllis	October 15–23	175 (110)	950	None	None	None	
Rita	October 17–30	280 (175)	878	Caroline Islands, Mariana Islands, Philippines	US$100 million	≥444	
Susan	October 18–24	210 (130)	954	None	None	None	
Sergio	October 18–21	65 (40)	Unknown	None	None	None	
BOB 09	October 25–28	70 (45)	Unknown	Bangladesh	Unknown	Unknown	
Unnumbered	October 26–29	50 (30)	1008	None	None	None	
Kendra	October 28–November 1	130 (80)	990	Puerto Rico, East Coast of the United States	US$6 million	1	
Twenty-seven	October 29–November 3	95 (60)	992	Philippines, Vietnam	None	None	
Tess	October 31–November 7	115 (70)	975	None	None	None	

=== November ===
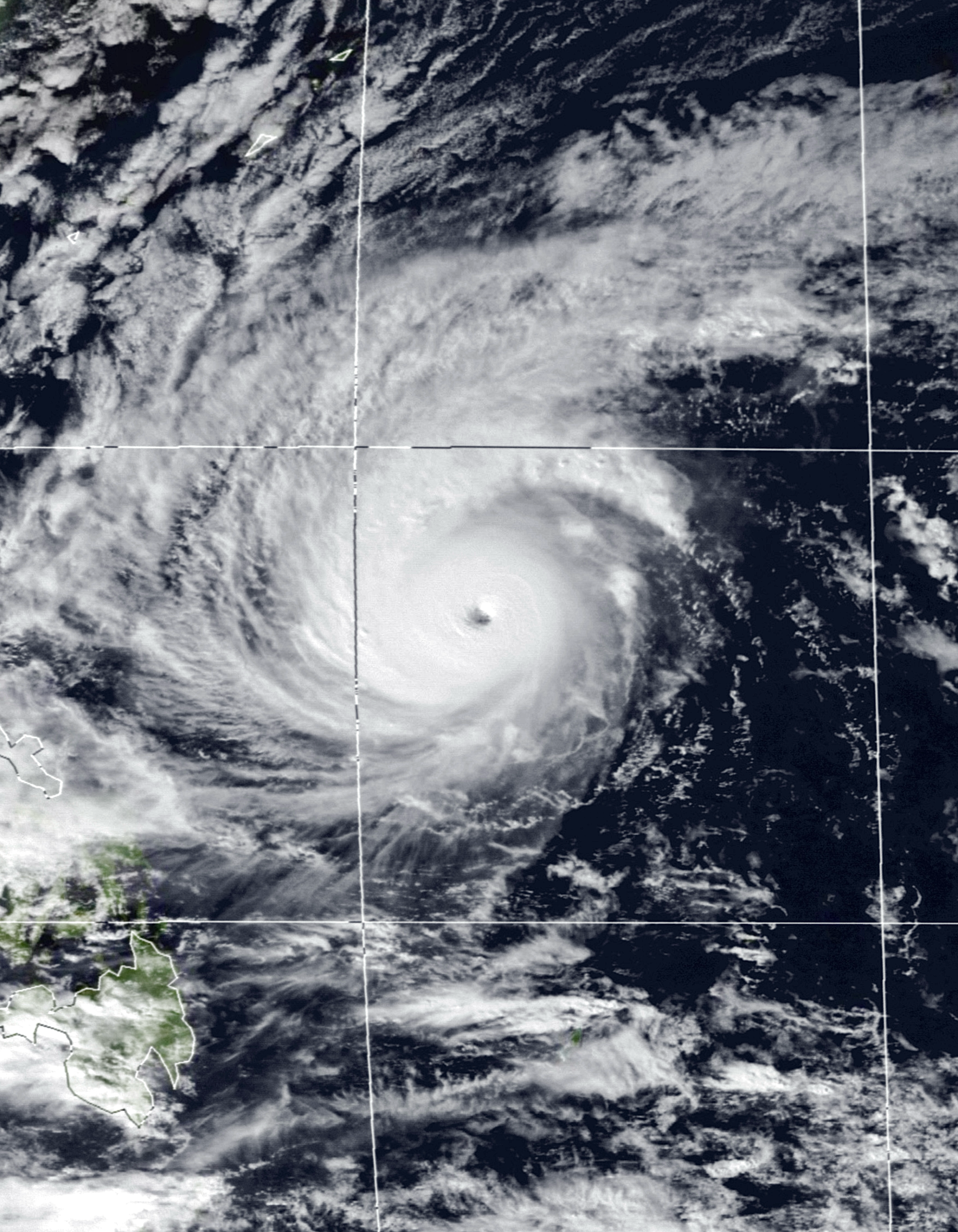
Typhoon Viola

November was an average month in terms of tropical cyclone formation, eleven formed though only three were named out of them, excluding Tropical Depression Delang which was unofficially named by PAGASA. (Note: Tropical Depression Delang was tagged 30W by the Joint Typhoon Warning Center.) The month started with the final tropical cyclone of this year’s Atlantic hurricane season, a short-lived tropical depression off the U.S. East Coast that dissipated about 275 mi (443 km) east of Virginia Beach, Virginia. BOB 10 was the only North Indian cyclone to intensify beyond Cyclonic Storm status in the Arabian Sea this year. Typhoon Viola was the strongest storm of the month peaking as a Category 4 typhoon in the Philippine Sea without causing any damage. BOB 11 was not only the most destructive and deadliest storm of the month but the most destructive and deadliest of the year after devastating Sri Lanka, 915 people lost their lives as a result of the deadly cyclone as it caused $627 million in damages.

Tropical cyclones formed in November 1978
Storm name	Dates active	Max wind km/h (mph)	Pressure (hPa)	Areas affected	Damage (USD)	Deaths	Refs
Unnumbered	November 3–5	55 (35)	1006	None	None	None	
BOB 10	November 3–13	145 (90)	940	India, Pakistan	Unknown	Unknown	
TD	November 9–11	Unknown	1008	Vietnam	None	None	
TD	November 10–12	Unknown	1004	Philippines	None	None	
TD	November 15–16	Unknown	1004	Vietnam	None	None	
Delang	November 16–20	55 (35)	1008	Philippines	None	None	
Viola	November 17–24	235 (145)	910	Caroline Islands	None	None	
BOB 11	November 17–29	170 (105)	938	Sri Lanka, India	US$627 million	915	
01S	November 19–23	70 (45)	Unknown	None	None	None	
TD	November 25–December 1	Unknown	1004	Malaysia	None	None	
Winnie	November 25–30	115 (70)	975	Mariana Islands	None	None	

=== December ===
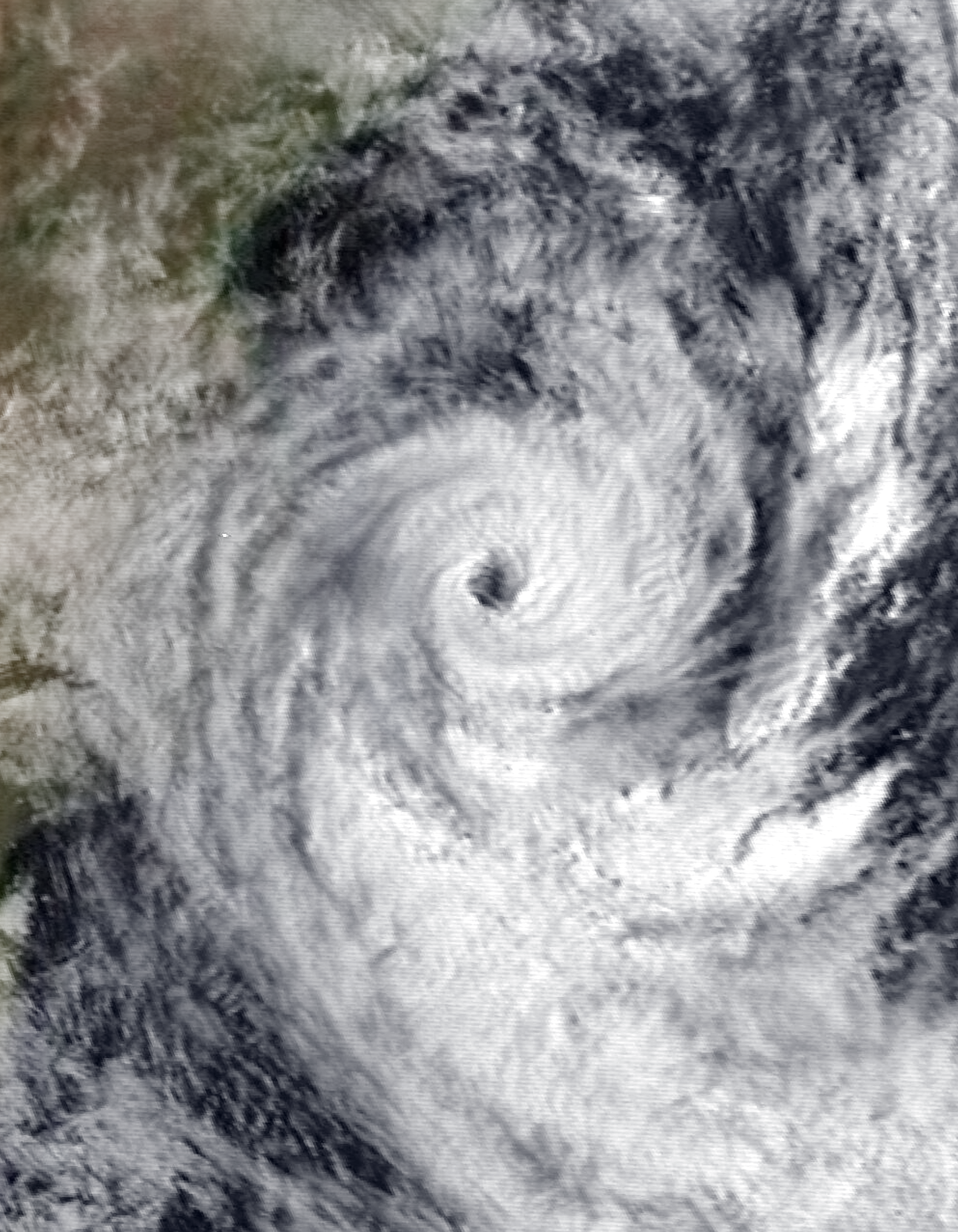
Cyclone Angele

The final month of the year was significantly less active than the previous months, with only five tropical cyclones forming and two being named from them, excluding PAGASA-named Tropical Depression Garding. The month started off concluding this year’s Pacific typhoon season with the formations of a tropical depression classified by the Japan Meteorological Agency (JMA) and the previously aforementioned Garding, a short lull separated the two systems. Tropical Storm 03S formed in the Australian region, crossing into the South-West Indian Ocean before dissipating. Cyclone Fay impacted Fiji late in the month kickstarting the 1978–79 South Pacific cyclone season. The strongest and deadliest tropical cyclone of the month was Cyclone Angele which ravaged portions of Mozambique and Madagascar whilst moving slowly in the Mozambique Channel, peaking as a strong Category 3-equivalent cyclone, killing 74. The last tropical cyclone of the year was Cyclone Peter which impacted the Cape York Peninsula and the surrounding areas of the Gulf of Carpentaria causing $10 million in damages and the lives of two, Peter later crossed into the New Year before dissipating on January 4.

Tropical cyclones formed in December 1978
Storm name	Dates active	Max wind km/h (mph)	Pressure (hPa)	Areas affected	Damage (USD)	Deaths	Refs
TD	December 4	Unknown	1008	None	None	None	
Garding	December 13–19	55 (35)	1004	Philippines	Unknown	None	
Angele	December 13–29	200 (125)	941	Mozambique, Madagascar	Unknown	74	
03S	December 20–26	105 (65)	Unknown	None	None	None	
Fay	December 27–31	105 (65)	980	Fiji	Unknown	Unknown	
Peter	December 29–January 4	145 (90)	980	Far North Queensland, Arnhem Land	US$10 million	2	
