= Tropical Storm Agnes (1978) =

Pacific tropical storm

Severe Tropical Storm Agnes
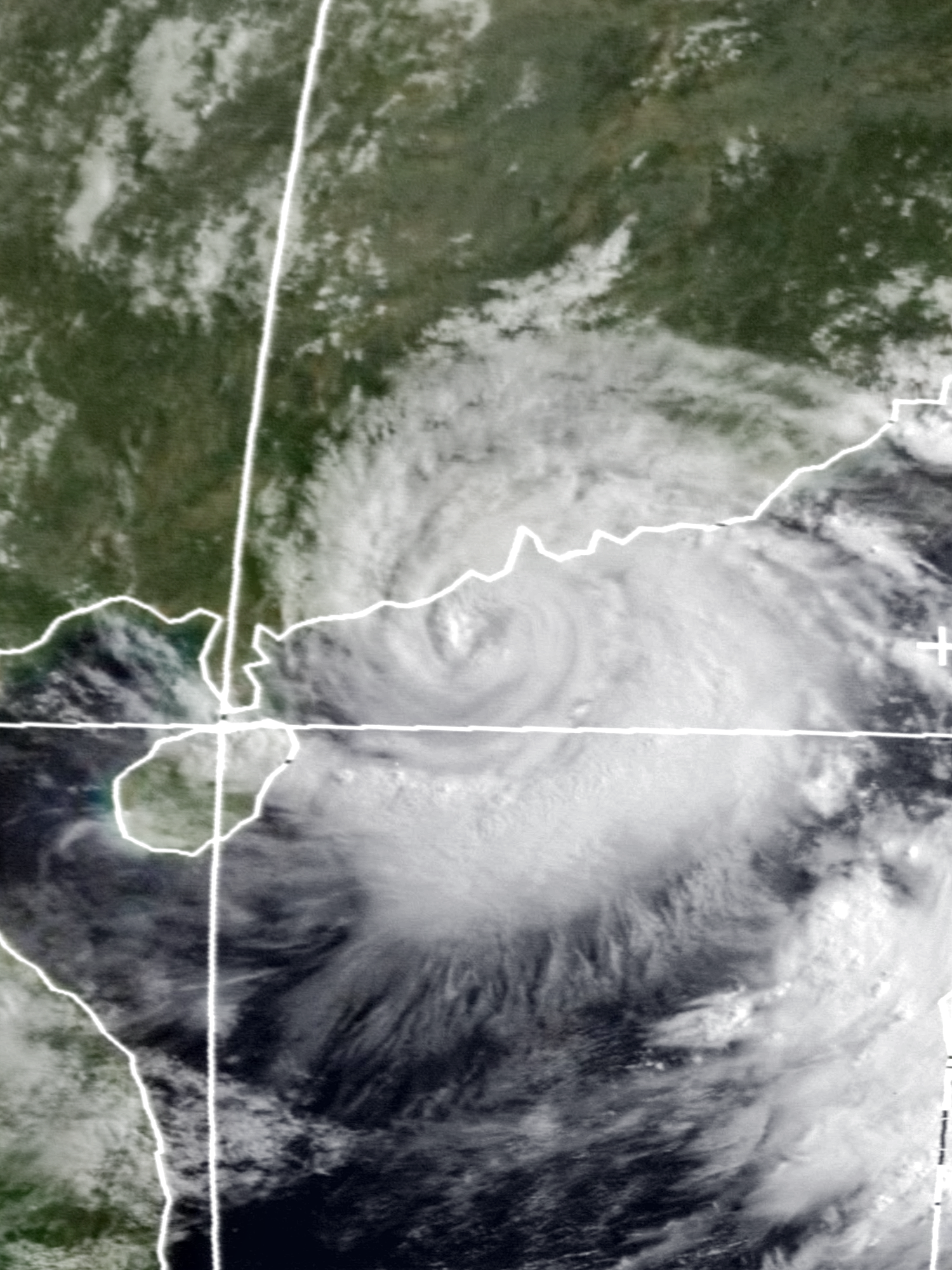
- Tropical Storm Agnes near peak intensity on July 26

Meteorological history
- Formed: July 24, 1978
- Dissipated: July 30, 1978

Tropical storm
- 1-minute sustained (SSHWS/NWS)
- Highest winds: 60 mph (95 km/h)
- Lowest pressure: 970 mbar (hPa); 28.64 inHg

Overall effects
- Fatalities: 3
- Areas affected: British Hong Kong, Portuguese Macau, Mainland China
- Part of the 1978 Pacific typhoon season

Severe Tropical Storm Agnes was the ninth named storm of the 1978 Pacific typhoon season. It was one of the rare tropical cyclones that formed in the South China Sea and intensified into a severe tropical storm. Shortly after forming, Agnes moved slowly northward toward the sea off Shanwei, then took a westward path along the southern Chinese coast, affecting the Pearl River Estuary. Influenced by Typhoon Wendy and a significant eastward retreat of the subtropical ridge, Agnes reversed its path, making a "u-turn" to move northeast and impact the Pearl River Estuary again before making landfall east of the estuary and dissipating.

Agnes impacted the Pearl River Estuary twice, prompting the Royal Hong Kong Observatory to issue Signal No. 8 (gale or storm signal) on two occasions. It was the only time since World War II that the Observatory issued Signal No. 8 for all directions (northeast, southeast, northwest, and southwest). The tropical cyclone warnings were in effect for five days, marking the longest total duration of such warnings since World War II.

== Meteorological history ==
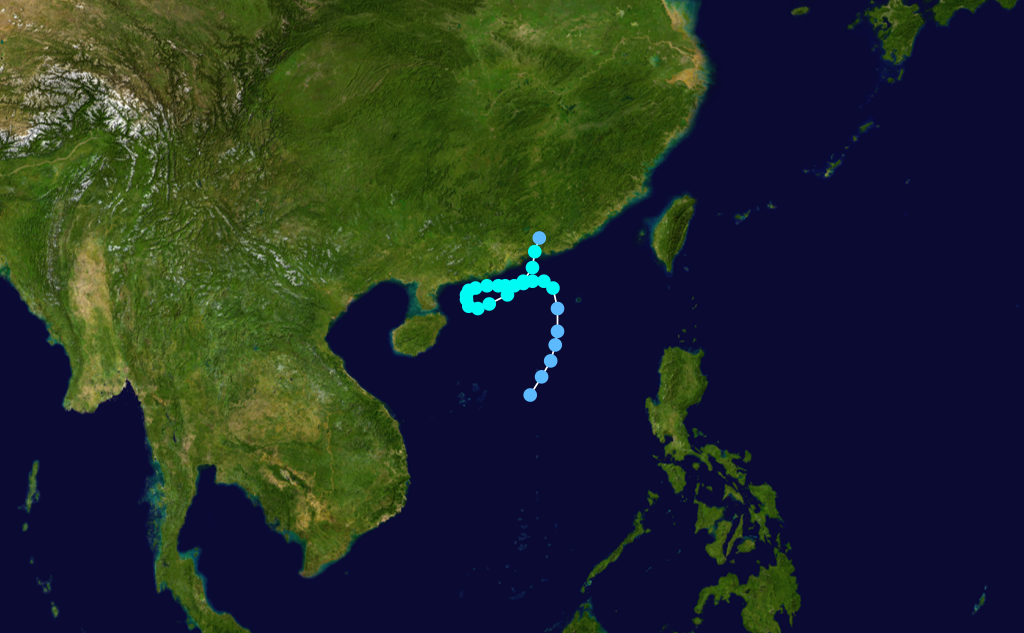
Map plotting the storm's track and intensity, according to the Saffir–Simpson scale Map key Saffir–Simpson scale Tropical depression (≤38 mph, ≤62 km/h) Tropical storm (39–73 mph, 63–118 km/h) Category 1 (74–95 mph, 119–153 km/h) Category 2 (96–110 mph, 154–177 km/h) Category 3 (111–129 mph, 178–208 km/h) Category 4 (130–156 mph, 209–251 km/h) Category 5 (≥157 mph, ≥252 km/h) Unknown Storm type Tropical cyclone Subtropical cyclone Extratropical cyclone, remnant low, tropical disturbance, or monsoon depression

Agnes was one of the few tropical cyclones that formed in the South China Sea and intensified into a severe tropical storm. According to the Royal Hong Kong Observatory's tropical cyclone annual report, a low-pressure area formed in the northern South China Sea on July 22. Two days later, in the afternoon, satellite imagery analysis by the Observatory indicated that this low-pressure area had developed into a tropical depression, located approximately 570 km south of Hong Kong, moving northward at about 16 km/h toward southern China. The U.S. Joint Typhoon Warning Center assessed that the tropical depression strengthened into a tropical storm on the afternoon of July 25 southwest of the Pratas Islands, naming it Agnes. The Royal Hong Kong Observatory followed suit on the same day, and Taiwan's Central Weather Administration upgraded it to a minimal typhoon on the same date. (Note: Most regional meteorological centers, including the Japan Meteorological Agency, use 10-minute sustained winds to measure tropical cyclone intensity, but the U.S. Joint Typhoon Warning Center uses 1-minute sustained winds, with a conversion ratio of approximately 1:1.14.)

Late on July 25, Agnes moved to the sea off Shanwei, continuing to intensify. Initially, the subtropical ridge in the western Pacific was positioned eastward, with its western ridge point around 120°E, allowing Agnes to move northward toward southern China. By July 26–27, the ridge extended westward to around 115°E, and Agnes, influenced by easterly airflow south of the ridge, turned westward, moving slowly along the southern Chinese coast toward the east of the Leizhou Peninsula. As it moved west, Agnes's circulation continued to organize. On the morning of July 26, the Royal Hong Kong Observatory upgraded it to a severe tropical storm. During the day, it passed near the Pearl River Estuary, affecting the area. By evening, Agnes nearly stalled south of Hong Kong, then resumed a slow westward movement, gradually moving away from Hong Kong toward the south of Shangchuan Island and continuing toward the Leizhou Peninsula.

As Typhoon Wendy entered the Pacific near the Ryukyu Islands later on July 27, Agnes was affected by Wendy's broad circulation, triggering the Fujiwhara effect. This caused Agnes to slow down and nearly stall again. Simultaneously, the subtropical ridge retreated eastward significantly within a short period, with its western ridge point moving to around 130°E by July 29. Combined with these factors, Agnes began to alter its path on July 28, looping counterclockwise east of the Leizhou Peninsula before moving eastward at 8 km/h, approaching the Pearl River Estuary again. On July 29, influenced by the ridge's retreat and southwest airflow related to Wendy, Agnes turned northeast, accelerating to 15 km/h toward areas east of Hong Kong. The Pearl River Estuary experienced storm impacts again that day, with gales and heavy rain. Late that evening, radar observations from the Royal Hong Kong Observatory showed Agnes moving north-northeast, slightly weakening. Agnes made landfall on the coast of Pinghai Town, Huidong County, on the morning of July 30, entering southern China. Due to terrain effects, its structure was severely disrupted, rapidly weakening. On the same day, the Joint Typhoon Warning Center, Hong Kong Observatory, and Central Weather Bureau downgraded it to a tropical depression, and it soon dissipated in eastern Guangdong.

== Impact ==
=== Hong Kong ===
Maximum hourly average wind speeds recorded by the Royal Hong Kong Observatory in various locations (data from the first impact). Legend:
indicates gale
indicates storm
Maximum hourly average wind speeds recorded by the Royal Hong Kong Observatory in various locations (data from the second impact). Legend:
indicates strong wind
indicates gale
indicates storm
- Local peak intensity classification: Severe tropical storm (HKO)
- Local maximum sustained wind speed: 110 km/h (31 m/s; 59 kn) (10-minute)
- Highest local tropical cyclone warning signal: Signal No. 8 (all directions)
- Closest approach to local area: 3:00 a.m., July 30, 1978 (second impact)
- Closest position to local area: Approximately 60 km east of Observatory headquarters (second impact)

The Royal Hong Kong Observatory hoisted Signal No. 1 at 7:30 a.m. on July 25. As Agnes strengthened into a tropical storm and approached Hong Kong that afternoon, the Observatory upgraded to Signal No. 3 at 10:50 p.m. The following morning, as Agnes intensified into a severe tropical storm and moved toward the Guangdong coast, winds in Hong Kong strengthened, prompting the Observatory to issue Signal No. 8 Northeast at 9:00 a.m., followed by Signal No. 8 Southeast at 3:45 p.m., which remained in effect for nearly a day. As Agnes moved westward, the Observatory downgraded to Signal No. 3 at 1:30 p.m. on July 27. However, Agnes stalled and showed signs of turning back, posing a continued threat. Signal No. 3 remained in effect for over two days (approximately 52 hours), the second-longest duration on record. The Observatory warned of a possible second approach, urging residents not to let their guard down.

As predicted, influenced by Typhoon Wendy, Agnes approached the Pearl River Estuary again. The Observatory re-issued Signal No. 8 Northeast at 5:25 p.m. on July 29, followed by Signal No. 8 Northwest at 2:30 a.m. and Signal No. 8 Southwest at 4:40 a.m. on July 30. After Agnes made landfall in Huidong County, the Observatory downgraded to Signal No. 3 at 7:10 a.m. and removed all tropical cyclone warnings by 3:10 p.m. on July 30. Agnes's two impacts on the Pearl River Estuary led to warnings from July 25 to July 30, totaling five days—the longest duration since World War II. The Signal No. 8 Southeast was in effect for 21 hours and 45 minutes, a record for that signal until surpassed by Tropical Storm Lionrock's 22 hours in 2021. The issuance of Signal No. 8 for all directions was a unique event since World War II.

Due to Agnes, Hong Kong's sea, land, and air transport were heavily disrupted. All ferries within the harbor and to Macau and Mainland China were suspended, as were the Peak Tram, Hong Kong Tramways, and most bus routes from 3:00 p.m. on July 26. The Kowloon-Canton Railway operated normally. Transport briefly resumed around noon on July 27 as Agnes moved away. However, as Agnes returned to the Pearl River Estuary, transport was disrupted again from July 29. Ferries, buses, and flights were suspended, though the impact was minimal due to it being a weekend, with services gradually resuming the next day. During the storm's two impacts, Kai Tak Airport saw 176 flights canceled, delayed, or diverted.

Overall, Hong Kong's damage was moderate, but prolonged heavy rain persisted. The Observatory recorded 519 mm of rainfall, making Agnes the fifth-highest rainfall-producing tropical cyclone in Hong Kong since 1884, following Tropical Storm Agnes (1965). The extended rainfall severely impacted farmers in the New Territories. The Agriculture, Fisheries and Conservation Department reported that 515 acres (approximately 2.08 km²) of farmland were flooded, particularly in Tai Po District, with vegetable and fruit production expected to drop by half, causing market prices to rise up to fivefold. In San Tin, Ngau Tam Mei, 80% of fishponds overflowed, with tens of thousands of fish washed away, and vegetable fields required a month to recover, leaving no New Territories vegetables available during that period. In urban areas, heavy rain damaged numerous old buildings, with 20 declared dangerous and sealed off, mostly in Central and Western District. In Tsuen Wan, the Sha Tsui Road area saw severe flooding on July 30, with water depths of 0.6 to 1.2 meters. In Chai Wan Kok village, a drainage channel collapsed, sending mud and floodwater into a squatter area, destroying three wooden houses and damaging nearly 40 others, with no injuries reported. The storm caused three deaths and 134 injuries. Two victims, a vegetable vendor couple from Sha Tin, drowned on July 29 when their taxi lost control and fell into a water-filled ditch in Fo Tan. The driver escaped, but the couple did not. Another victim, an elderly woman in Wong Tai Sin's Ma Chai Hang squatter area, was buried by a landslide.

=== Macau ===
In Macau, the Macau Meteorological and Geophysical Bureau hoisted Signal No. 8 at 10:45 a.m. on July 26. The storm led to the cancellation of greyhound racing at the Canidrome, the closure of the Governor Nobre de Carvalho Bridge, suspension of transport services, and halting of ferries between Hong Kong and Macau. The Signal No. 8 was lowered at 5:45 p.m. the next day, with no reported casualties or significant damage, though the bridge remained closed. As the storm approached again, the bureau issued storm warnings and hoisted Signal No. 3 from 5:00 p.m. on July 29, suspending transport and cancelling greyhound racing again. Damage remained minimal, with only one vacant wooden building collapsing. Signal No. 3 was lowered at 6:30 a.m. the next day, and normal activity resumed, though tourist numbers significantly decreased due to the storm.

=== Mainland China ===
- Local peak intensity classification: Typhoon (CMA)
- Local maximum sustained wind speed: 40 m/s (140 km/h; 78 kn) (2-minute)
- Local minimum central pressure: 960 hPa (28.35 inHg)

The Guangdong Provincial Meteorological Observatory issued an emergency alert on July 26 for "Typhoon No. 7" (Agnes), noting that it would loop near the Pearl River Estuary or make landfall in central Guangdong within 24 hours, with heavy rain expected in Huiyang, Foshan, and Shantou. As Agnes looped at sea and approached Hong Kong again, the observatory noted on July 29 that the typhoon would likely land between Bao'an County and Huilai County. The typhoon made landfall around 7:00 a.m. on July 30 in Pinghai Town, east of the Pearl River Estuary. Bao'an County recorded 226 mm of torrential rain on the day of landfall, with a total of 440 mm during the storm, the highest among Guangdong counties. No severe damage was reported. Earlier, Guangdong had experienced its worst heatwave and drought since 1834, and Xinhua News Agency reported that the typhoon's arrival temporarily alleviated these conditions.

== See also ==
- 1978 Pacific typhoon season
