= Typhoon Olive (1978) =

Pacific typhoon in 1978

Typhoon Olive (Atang)
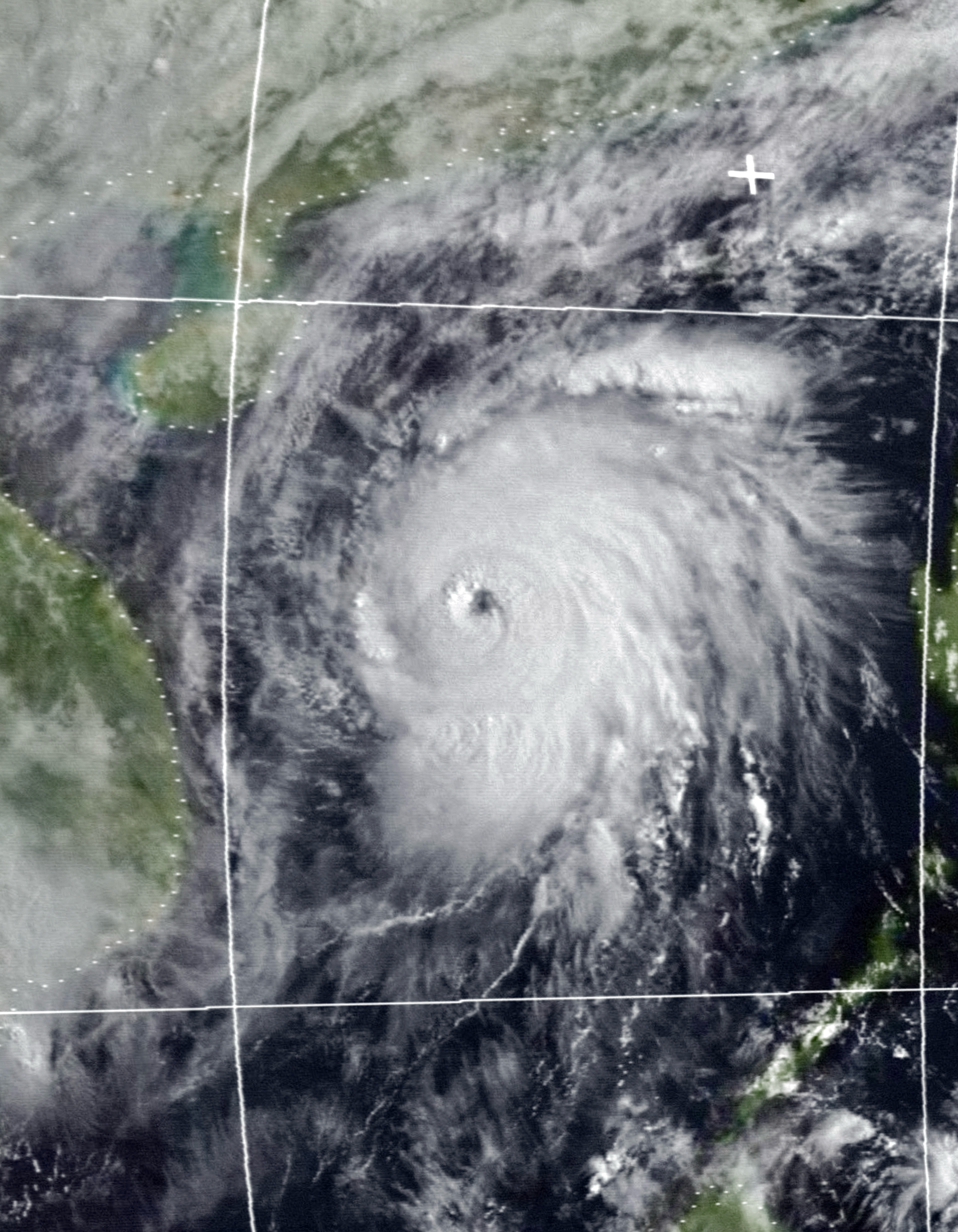
- Olive at peak intensity in the South China Sea on April 22

Meteorological history
- Formed: April 15, 1978
- Dissipated: April 26, 1978

Typhoon
- 10-minute sustained (JMA)
- Highest winds: 150 km/h (90 mph)
- Lowest pressure: 955 hPa (mbar); 28.20 inHg

Category 2-equivalent typhoon
- 1-minute sustained (SSHWS/JTWC)
- Highest winds: 155 km/h (100 mph)
- Lowest pressure: 955 hPa (mbar); 28.20 inHg

Overall effects
- Fatalities: 66
- Injuries: 47
- Missing: 45
- Damage: $32.2 million (1978 USD)
- IBTrACS
- Part of the 1978 Pacific typhoon season

Typhoon Olive, known in the Philippines as Typhoon Atang, was a powerful tropical cyclone which affected the Philippines and Taiwan during April 1978. The second named storm and first typhoon of the 1978 Pacific typhoon season, Olive developed from a low-pressure area on April 15. One week later, it would peak as a minimal typhoon with 10-minute sustained winds of 90 mph. After it, it would steadily weaken, being last noted on April 26

== Meteorological history ==
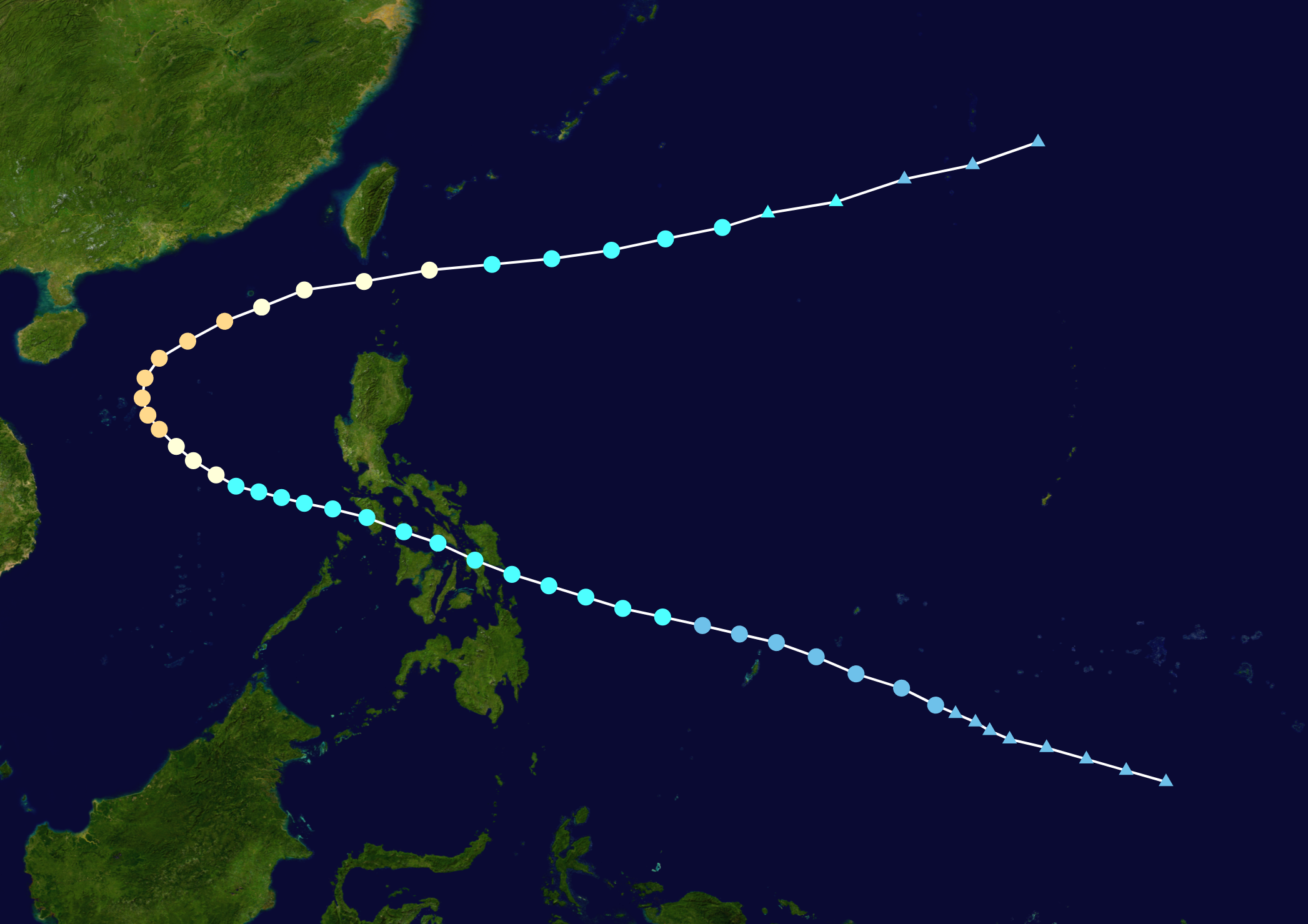
Map plotting the storm's track and intensity, according to the Saffir–Simpson scale Map key Saffir–Simpson scale Tropical depression (≤38 mph, ≤62 km/h) Tropical storm (39–73 mph, 63–118 km/h) Category 1 (74–95 mph, 119–153 km/h) Category 2 (96–110 mph, 154–177 km/h) Category 3 (111–129 mph, 178–208 km/h) Category 4 (130–156 mph, 209–251 km/h) Category 5 (≥157 mph, ≥252 km/h) Unknown Storm type Tropical cyclone Subtropical cyclone Extratropical cyclone, remnant low, tropical disturbance, or monsoon depression

In April 1978, the near-equatorial trough steadily tracked northwards, making cyclogenesis more likely to occur. On 12:00 UTC on April 11, the Joint Typhoon Warning Center (JTWC) began to monitor a surface circulation which had formed within the trough. Five days later, the JTWC issued their first warning on the system as Tropical Depression 02W as the nascent system began coalescing. On April 18, the system entered the Philippine Area of Responsibility, resulting in the Philippine Atmospheric, Geophysical and Astronomical Services Administration (PAGASA) naming the system Atang. Later that day, the system intensified into a tropical storm, resulting in it being named Olive. Soon after, Olive crossed the Leyte Gulf and the Philippine Islands, which hindered intensification.

Olive would steadily intensify after it entered the South China Sea on April 20, being in an environment with good outflow aloft and warm Sea surface temperatures, resulting in it intensifying into a typhoon on 6:00 UTC on April 22. Olive would recurve due to a break in the subtropical ridge, peaking with sustained winds of 100 mph (160 km/h) the next day. Olive would accelerate to the east-northeast, steadily weakening due to intruding cool and dry air, resulting in the system becoming extratropical early on April 26.

== Preparations and impacts ==
As Olive passed the Philippines, it would affect nearly 370,000 people in the nation, leaving 3,500 homeless. The MV Leyte, a lengthened ship of the Compania Maritima was caught in it, being wrecked in the southwestern portion of Sibuyan Island as she was on a Manila-Cebu voyage. The Hong Kong Observatory would hoist its Stand-By Signal No. 1 on April 24 as Olive neared the island but would lower it hours later as it left the area. Despite not affecting the island in any way, Olive would bring some light storm surges to the island. In total, 66 people died in the Philippines, and damage totaled ₱246 million (PHP, US$32.2 million).
