= 1978 Sri Lanka cyclone =

Strongest tropical cyclone to strike Sri Lanka

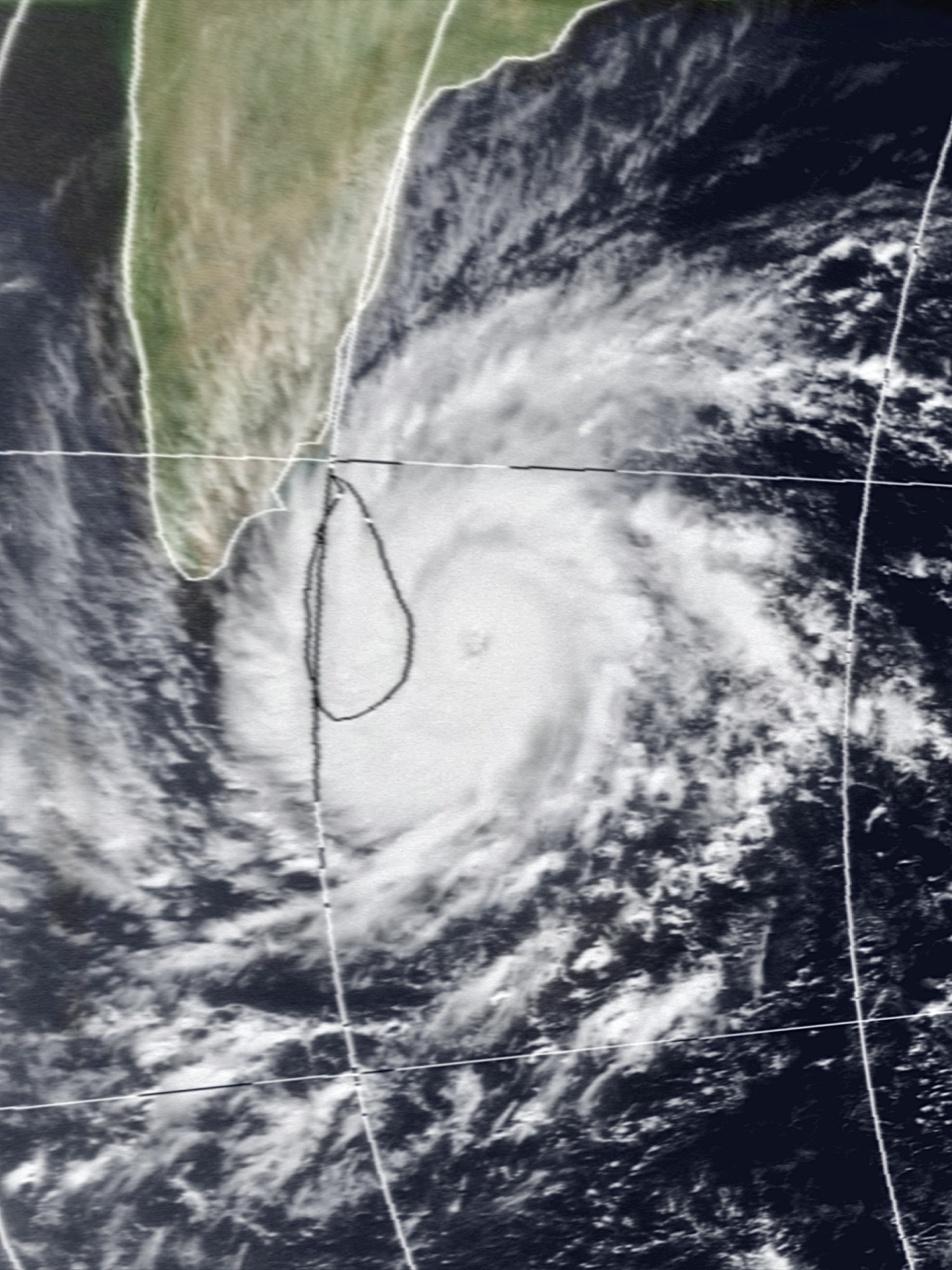
- Cyclone 04B at peak intensity shortly before making landfall in Sri Lanka on 23 November

Meteorological history
- Formed: 17 November 1978
- Dissipated: 29 November 1978

Super cyclonic storm
- 3-minute sustained (IMD)
- Highest winds: 220 km/h (140 mph)
- Lowest pressure: 938 hPa (mbar); 27.70 inHg

Category 2-equivalent tropical cyclone
- 1-minute sustained (SSHWS/JTWC)
- Highest winds: 165 km/h (105 mph)

Overall effects
- Fatalities: ~1000
- Damage: $627 million (1978 USD)
- Areas affected: Eastern Province, Sri Lanka
- IBTrACS
- Part of the 1978 North Indian Ocean cyclone season

The 1978 Sri Lanka Cyclone (JTWC designation: 04B) was one of the most destructive tropical cyclones to strike Sri Lanka since modern records began. The cyclone formed on 17 November 1978, and attained peak intensity on 23 November 1978, right before making landfall in Batticaloa. Sri Lanka's eastern province was heavily affected by the cyclone.

== Meteorological history ==
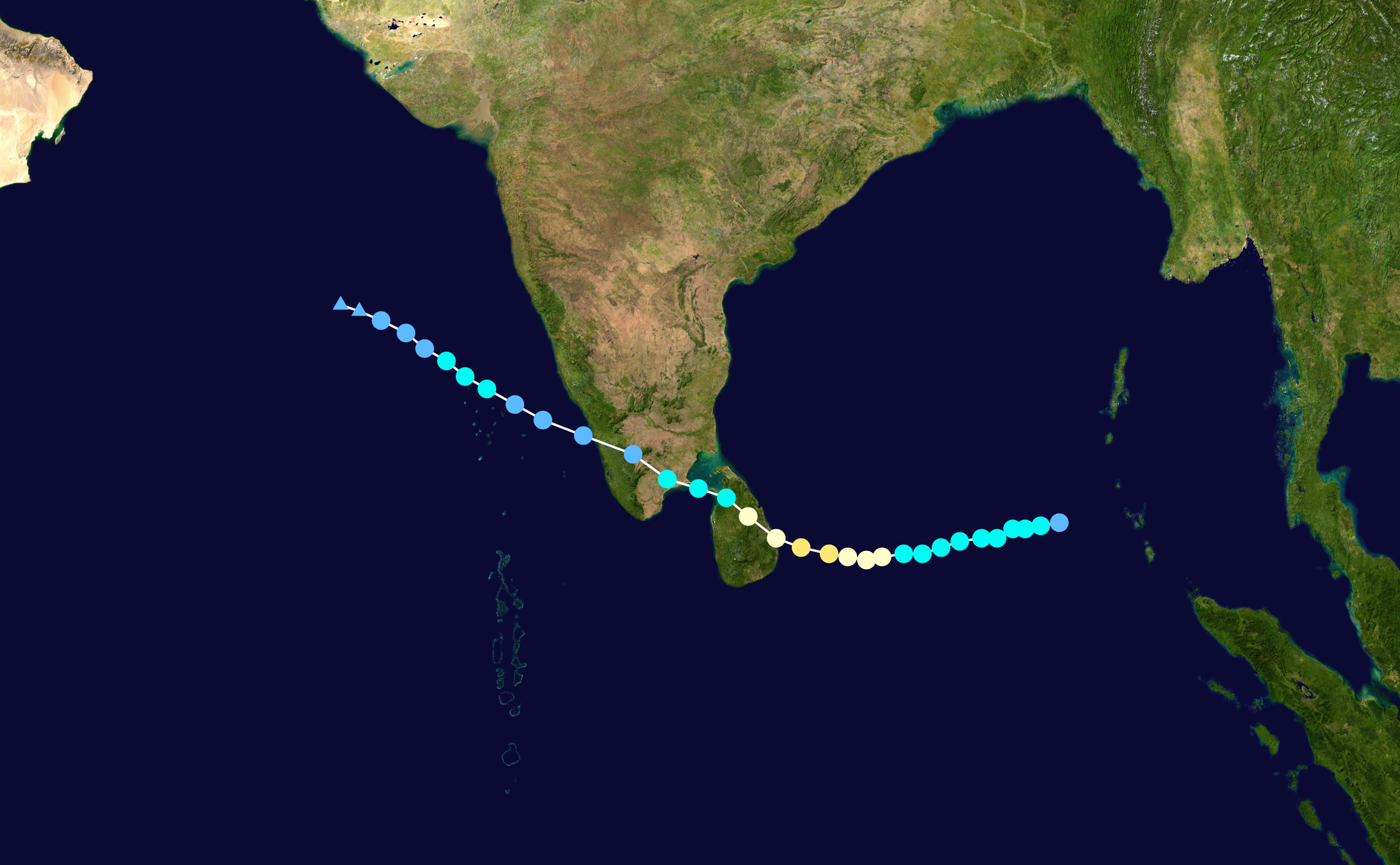
Map plotting the storm's track and intensity, according to the Saffir–Simpson scale Map key Saffir–Simpson scale Tropical depression (≤38 mph, ≤62 km/h) Tropical storm (39–73 mph, 63–118 km/h) Category 1 (74–95 mph, 119–153 km/h) Category 2 (96–110 mph, 154–177 km/h) Category 3 (111–129 mph, 178–208 km/h) Category 4 (130–156 mph, 209–251 km/h) Category 5 (≥157 mph, ≥252 km/h) Unknown Storm type Tropical cyclone Subtropical cyclone Extratropical cyclone, remnant low, tropical disturbance, or monsoon depression

The storm formed on 17 November over the southwest Bay of Bengal. It intensified gradually, reaching a peak intensity of 220 kmph (140 mph), while the Joint Typhoon Warning Center analyzed the storm as a Category 2 equivalent cyclone on the Saffir–Simpson scale on 23 November. The cyclone made landfall in Batticaloa at its peak intensity on the same night. It emerged over the Gulf of Mannar on the 24th. That same evening, the storm made its second landfall in Kilakkarai in Tamil Nadu with one-minute sustained winds of 85 kmph (50 mph). The storm then moved back into the ocean around the Kerala coast. It spent its remaining days over the Arabian Sea, eventually dissipating on 29 November.

== Impact ==
The cyclone had a devastating impact in Sri Lanka, killing about 915 people. An estimated more than one million people were affected, with over 250,000 buildings damaged, and one fifth of Batticaloa's fishing fleet destroyed. Nine of the 11 paddy stores were destroyed and 90 percent of the coconut plantation (28,000 odd acres of coconut plantation) in the Batticaloa district had been destroyed. The Sri Lankan government spent over 600 million Sri Lankan rupees in relief efforts in the aftermath of the disaster. A tropical cyclone report noted that over 130 electrical lines were downed and many of the religious buildings were completely destroyed. The cyclone resulted in a substantial number of people being left without electricity and water. Many houses suffered severe structural damage.

The impact of the storm in India was minimal. The storm brought some damage to the province of Nadu. In the Ramanathapuram and Tuticorin districts nearly 5000 huts were damaged, and damages in Indian Rupees were estimated to be 5 crores ($626.8 1978 USD). The storm brought rainfall over Kerala and the Lakshadweep Islands.
