= 1978 hurricane season =

1978 hurricane season may refer to:

- The 1978 Atlantic hurricane season
- The 1978 Pacific hurricane season
