= 1978 North Indian Ocean cyclone season =

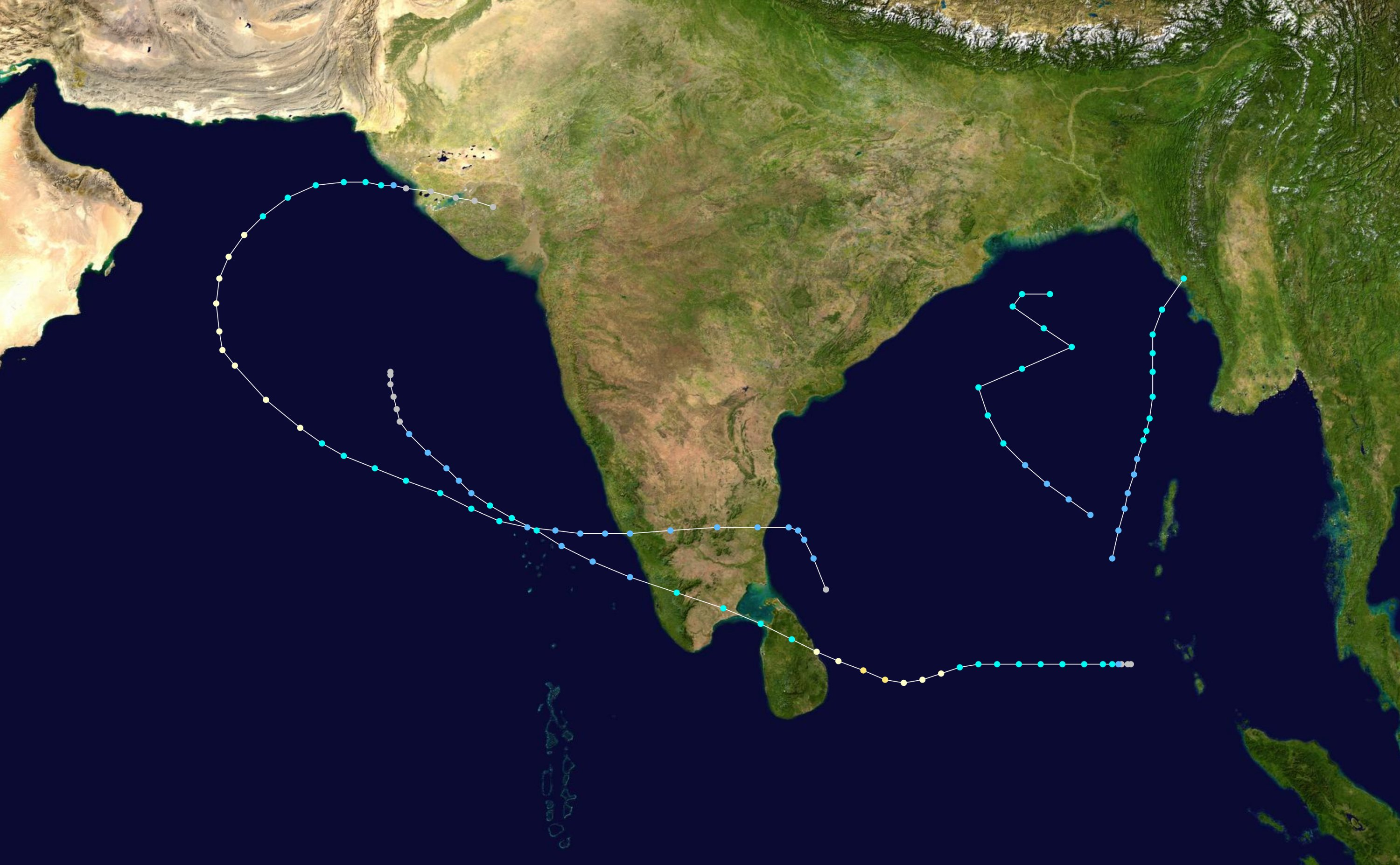
- Season summary map

Seasonal boundaries
- First system formed: May 14, 1978
- Last system dissipated: November 29, 1978

Strongest storm
- Name: 04B
  - Maximum winds: 220 km/h (140 mph) (3-minute sustained)
  - Lowest pressure: 938 hPa (mbar)

Seasonal statistics
- Depressions: 15
- Deep depressions: 11
- Cyclonic storms: 5
- Severe cyclonic storms: 3
- Total fatalities: 1000+
- Total damage: $626.89 million (1978 USD)

Related articles
- 1978 Atlantic hurricane season; 1978 Pacific hurricane season; 1978 Pacific typhoon season

The 1978 North Indian Ocean cyclone season had no bounds, but tropical cyclones in the North Indian Ocean tend to form between April and December, with peaks in May and November. The 1978 season produced five cyclonic storms of which developed into three severe cyclonic storms. All Five of the storms formed in the Bay of Bengal and four of those made landfall. The most notable storm of the season was Cyclone Four which hit Sri Lanka.

== Systems ==
=== Very Severe Cyclonic Storm BOB 01 (01B) ===
- Very severe cyclonic storm (IMD)
- Tropical storm (SSHWS)
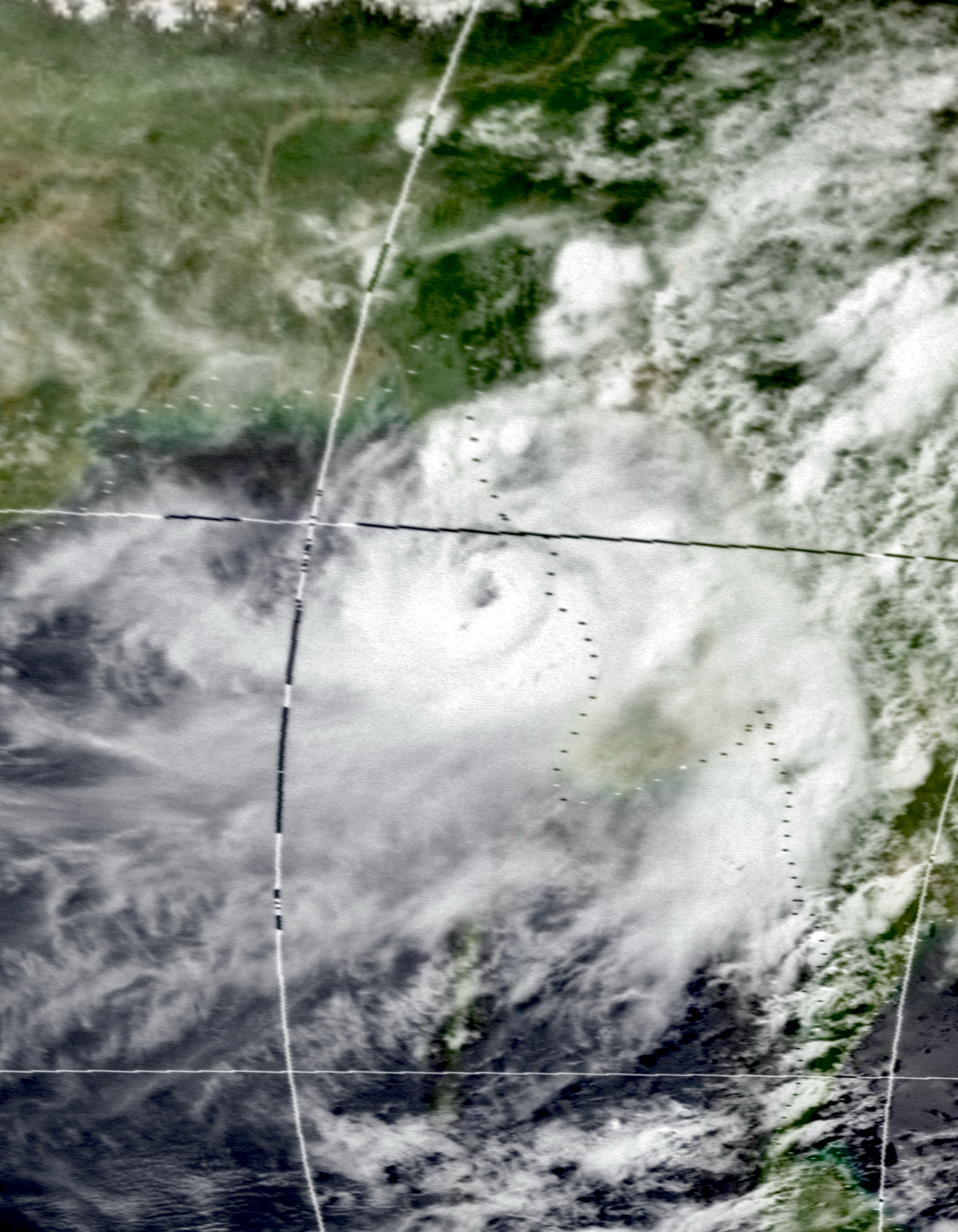
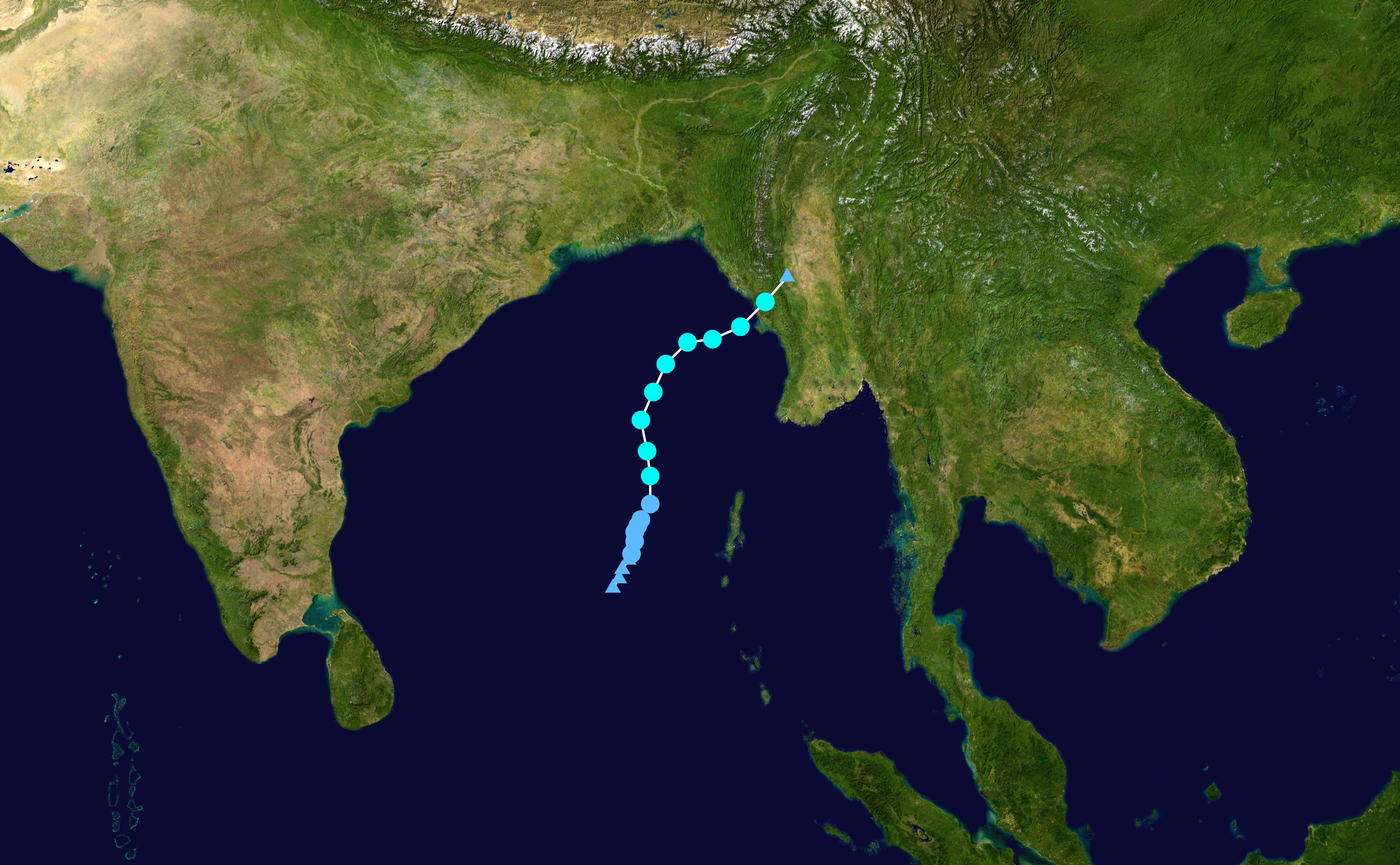
- Duration: May 14 – May 17
- Peak intensity: 150 km/h (90 mph) (3-min); 964 hPa (mbar)

A depression formed in the northern Bay of Bengal on May 14 and move northward. The depression slowly strengthened into a cyclonic storm On May 15. The storm reached its maximum intensity of 70 mph (115 km/h) before making landfall in Eastern Bangladesh on May 17 and dissipating thereafter. The effects from Cyclonic Storm One if any are unknown.

=== Cyclonic Storm BOB 09 (02B) ===
- Cyclonic storm (IMD)
- Tropical storm (SSHWS)
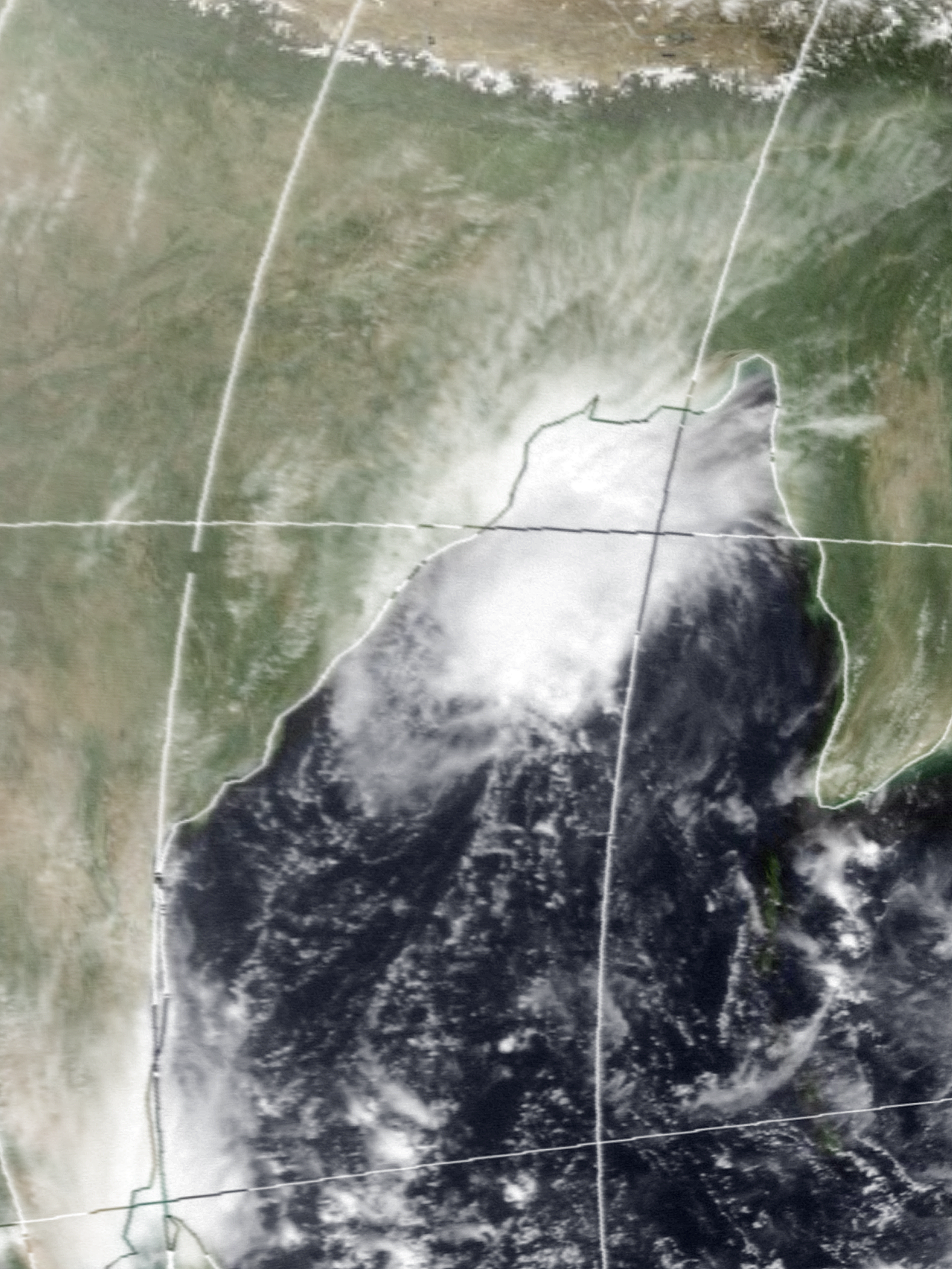
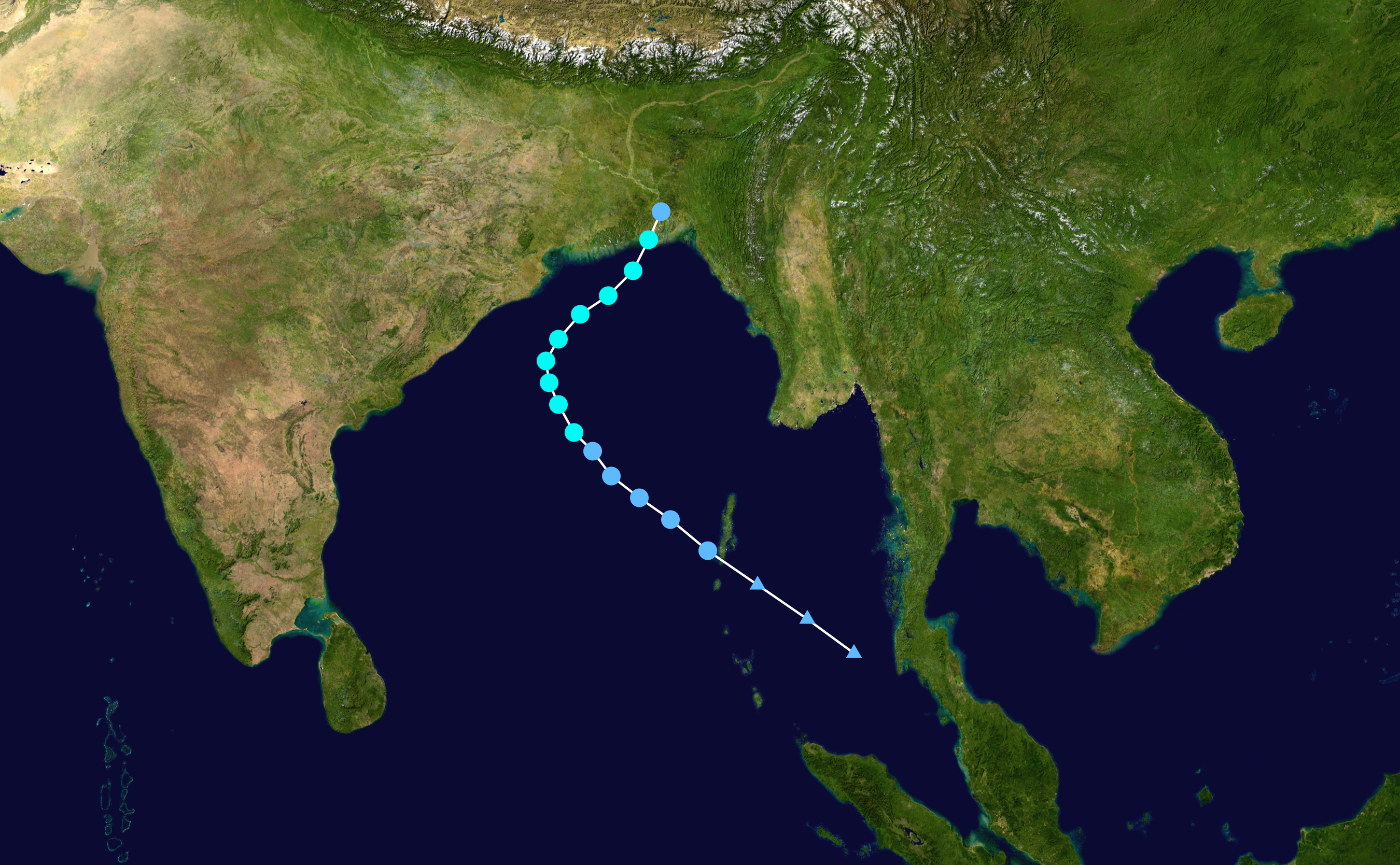
- Duration: October 25 – October 28
- Peak intensity: 85 km/h (50 mph) (3-min);

Another tropical depression formed in the Bay of Bengal on October 25 and moved northwestward. The depression became a cyclonic storm the following day The storm then turned to the northeast and then back to the northwest were its winds peaked at 45 mph (70 km/h) before dissipating off the coast of Bangladesh on October 28.

=== Extremely Severe Cyclonic Storm BOB 10 (03B) ===
- Extremely severe cyclonic storm (IMD)
- Category 1 tropical cyclone (SSHWS)
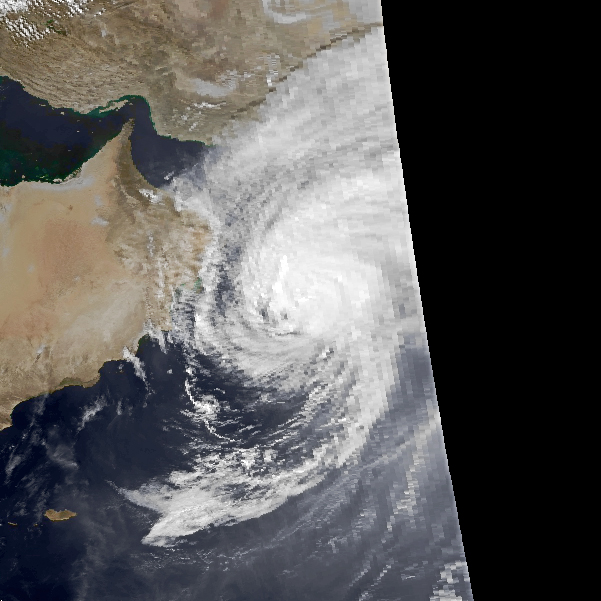
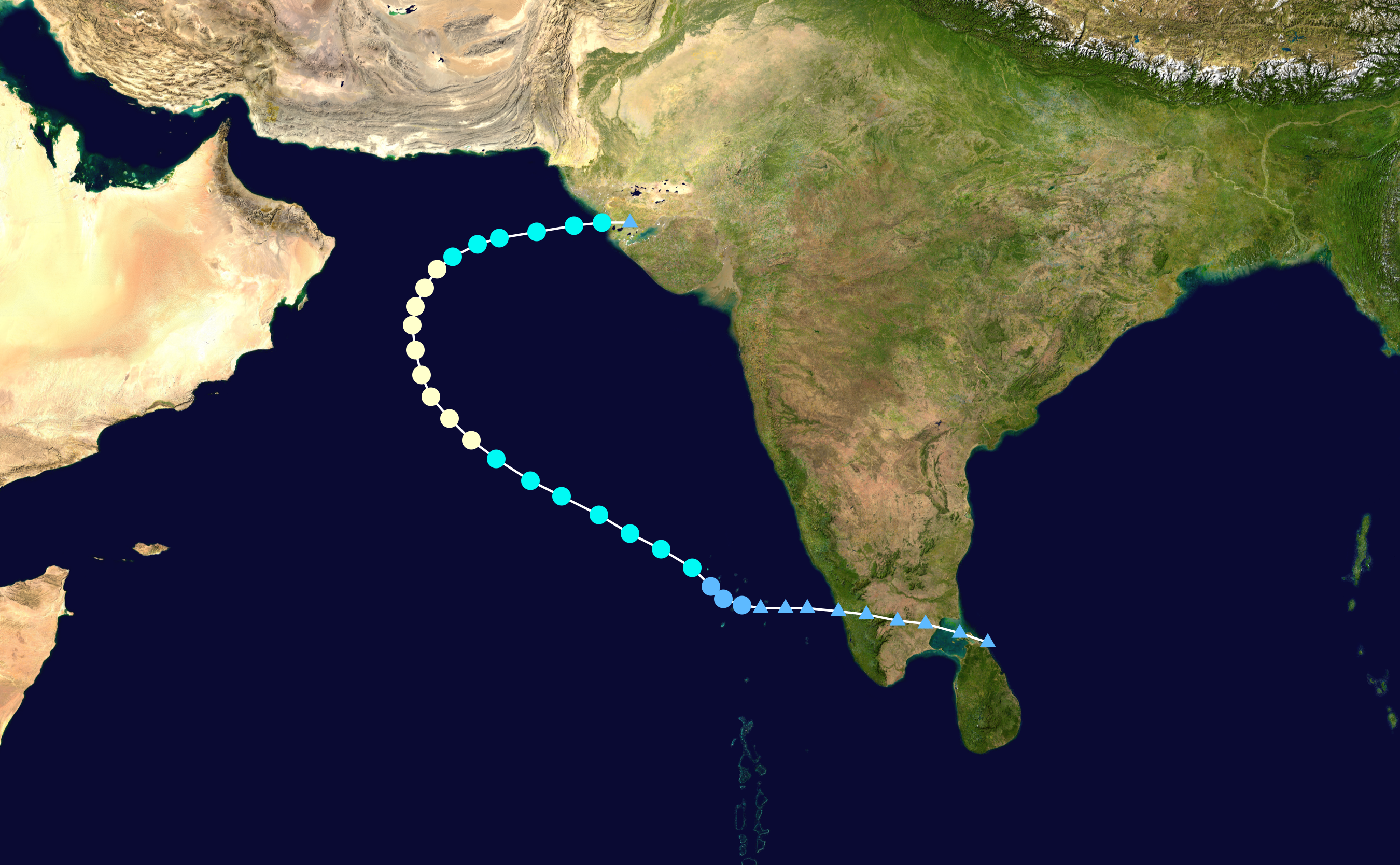
- Duration: November 3 – November 13
- Peak intensity: 215 km/h (130 mph) (3-min); 940 hPa (mbar)

=== Super Cyclonic Storm BOB 11 (04B) ===
- Super cyclonic storm (IMD)
- Category 2 tropical cyclone (SSHWS)
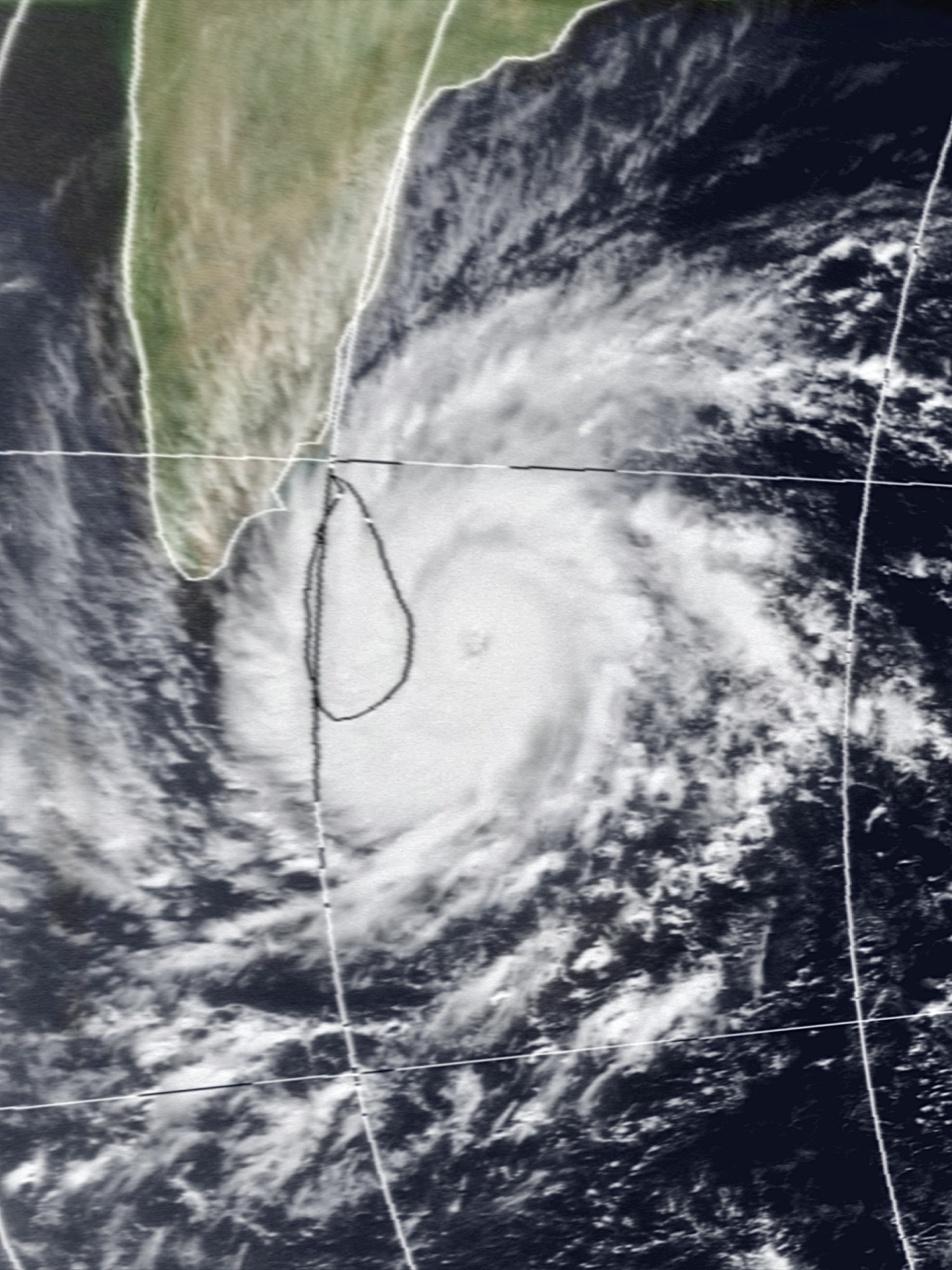
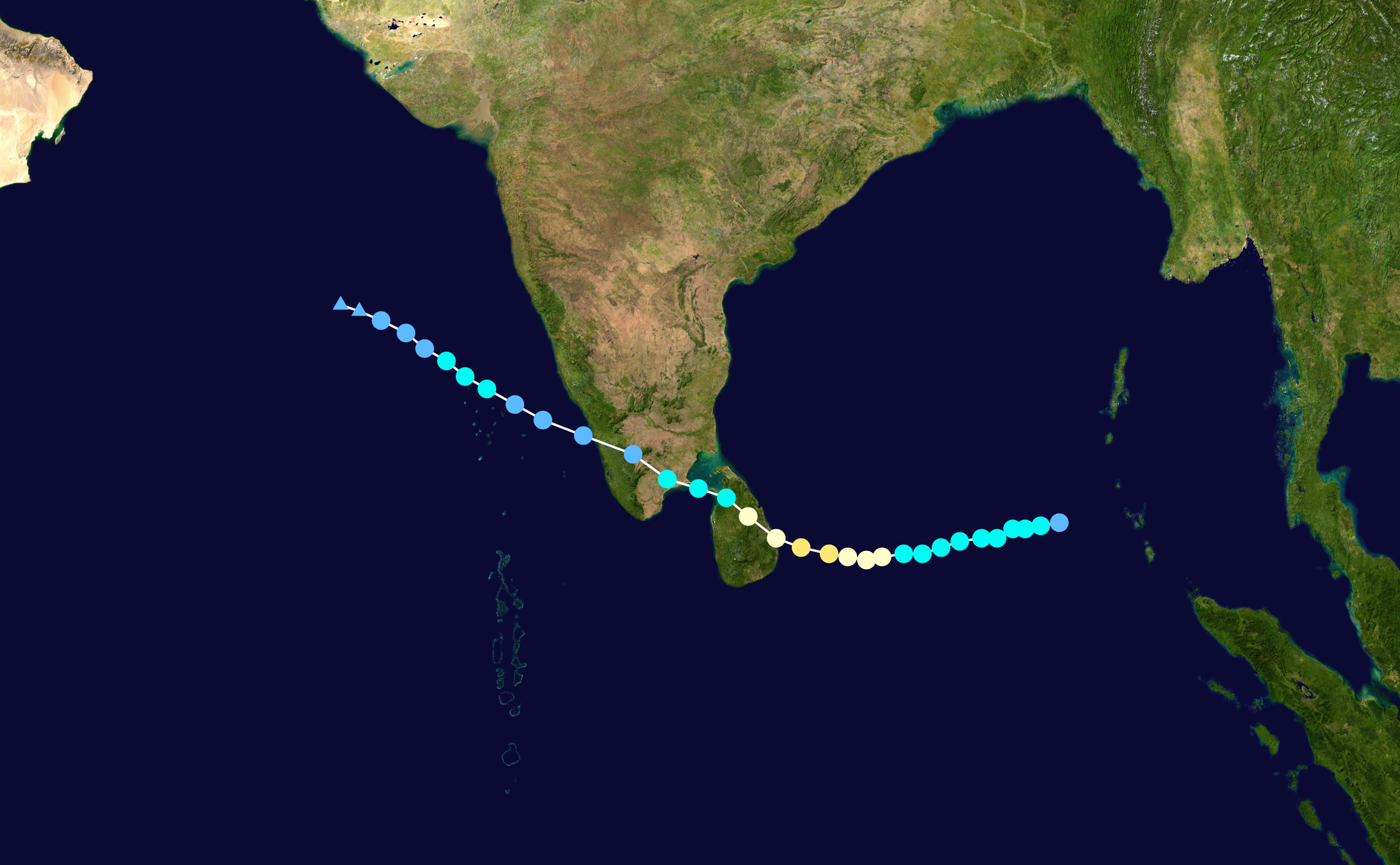
- Duration: November 17 – November 29
- Peak intensity: 220 km/h (140 mph) (3-min); 938 hPa (mbar)

The final tropical cyclone existed from November 19 to November 29. The 1978 Sri Lanka cyclone was the strongest tropical cyclone to strike Eastern province of Sri Lanka, making landfall on November 23.

== See also ==
- Tropical cyclones in 1978
- North Indian Ocean tropical cyclone
- 1978 Atlantic hurricane season
- 1978 Pacific hurricane season
- 1978 Pacific typhoon season
- Australian cyclone seasons: 1977–78, 1978–79
- South Pacific cyclone seasons: 1977–78, 1978–79
- South-West Indian Ocean cyclone seasons: 1977–78, 1978–79
