= 1978 Atlantic hurricane season =

- Season summary map

Seasonal boundaries
- First system formed: January 18, 1978
- Last system dissipated: November 5, 1978

Strongest storm
- By maximum sustained winds: Ella
  - Maximum winds: 140 mph (220 km/h) (1-minute sustained)
  - Lowest pressure: 956 mbar (hPa; 28.23 inHg)
- By central pressure: Greta
  - Maximum winds: 130 mph (215 km/h) (1-minute sustained)
  - Lowest pressure: 947 mbar (hPa; 27.97 inHg)

Seasonal statistics
- Total depressions: 24
- Total storms: 12
- Hurricanes: 5
- Major hurricanes (Cat. 3+): 2
- Total fatalities: 42 total
- Total damage: $141 million (1978 USD)

Related articles
- Timeline of the 1978 Atlantic hurricane season; 1978 Pacific hurricane season; 1978 Pacific typhoon season; 1978 North Indian Ocean cyclone season

The 1978 Atlantic hurricane season was a slightly above average hurricane season in terms of number of named storms. Eleven tropical cyclones were named in all, and five of these became hurricanes; two of the five became a major hurricane (Category 3 or higher on the Saffir–Simpson scale). This was also the last Atlantic hurricane season to use an all-female naming list. The season officially began on June 1, 1978, and ended on November 30, 1978. These dates, adopted by convention, denote the period in each year when most tropical cyclogenesis occurs in the Atlantic basin. However, the formation of subtropical or tropical cyclones is possible at any time of the year, as shown by the formation of an unnamed subtropical storm on January 18.

Three storms made landfall along the coast of the western Gulf of Mexico during the season. At the end of July and into early August, short-lived Tropical Storm Amelia and its remnants caused extensive flooding in Texas after dropping as much as 48 in (1,200 mm) of rain. There were 33 deaths and US$110 million (equivalent to $425.55 million in 2025) in damage. Also in August, Tropical Storm Bess made landfall in Veracruz, and later, Tropical Storm Debra did so in Louisiana. Neither caused significant damage, though Debra or its remnants spawned multiple tornadoes that killed two people. Hurricanes Ella and Greta each reached Category 4 strength. Though remaining out at sea, Ella did lash the East Coast of the United States and Atlantic Canada with gusty winds and rip currents in early September. Greta brought strong winds, high tides, and flooding to Central America, particularly Belize and Honduras, resulting in about $25 million in damage and at least five fatalities. The storm crossed intact into the eastern Pacific Ocean and was renamed Olivia. Overall, the storms of this season collectively caused $141 million in damage and 42 fatalities.

== Season summary ==
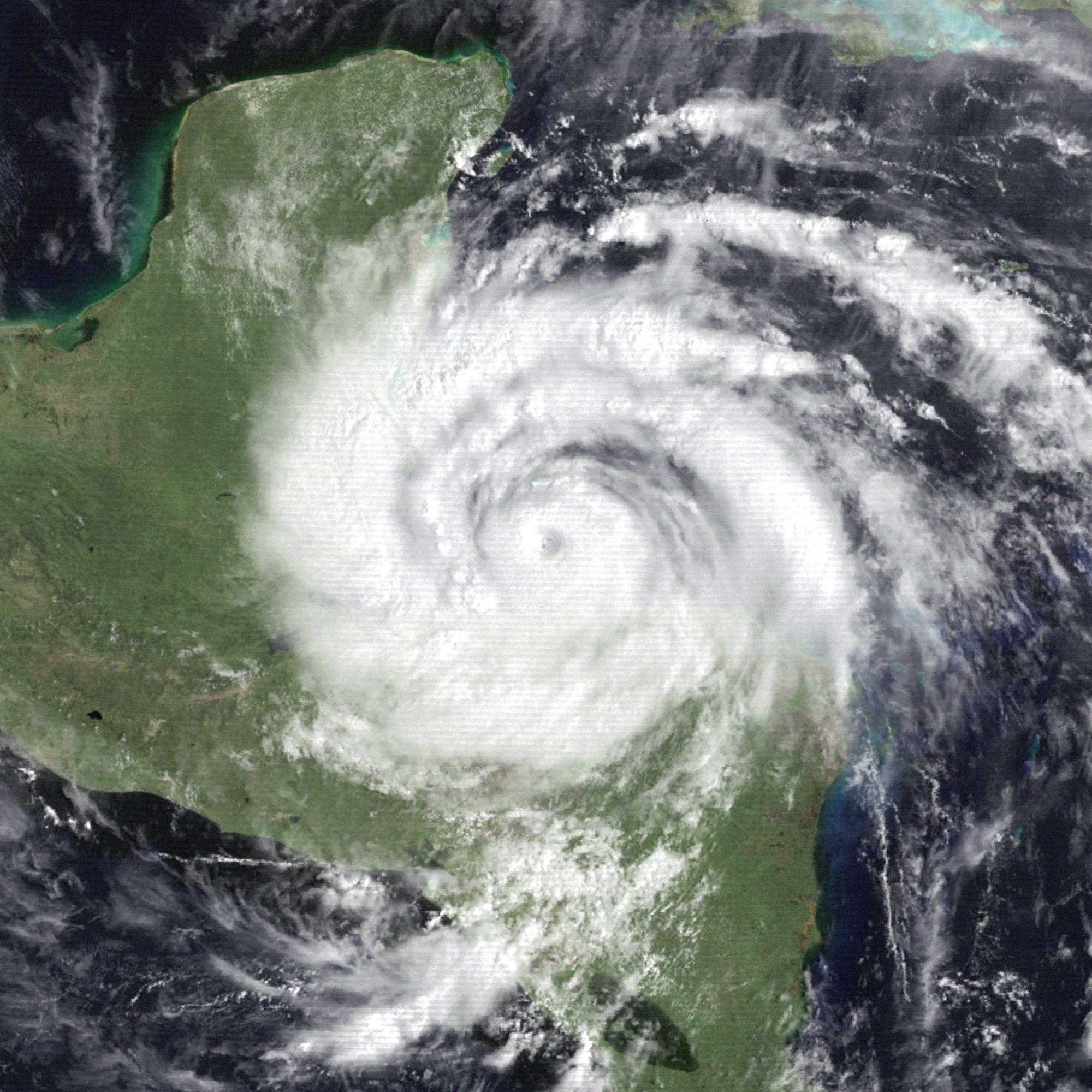
Hurricane Greta directly north of Honduras on September 18

The Atlantic hurricane season officially began on June 1, 1978. Although 24 tropical cyclones developed, only twelve of them reached tropical storm intensity, which is slightly above the 1966-2009 average of 11.3 named storms per season. Of the twelve tropical storms, five of them strengthened into a hurricane, which is slightly below the 1966-2009 average of 6.2. Two of the five hurricane became major hurricanes, which is Category 3 or greater on the Saffir–Simpson hurricane wind scale. Three tropical storms and two hurricanes made landfall during the season. Collectively, the tropical cyclones of the 1978 season caused at least 42 fatalities and $141 million, with $6 million in damage and one death in Puerto Rico from the precursor of Hurricane Kendra. The season officially ended on November 30, 1978.

Tropical cyclogenesis began very early, with the development of a subtropical storm on January 18. It dissipated about five days later. However, the next tropical cyclone, an unnumbered depression, did not develop until June 21. In July, there were two systems, including an unnumbered tropical depression and Tropical Storm Amelia. Seven tropical cyclones formed in August, including Tropical Depression Four, tropical storms Bess and Debra and hurricanes Cora and Ella. There were also seven systems in September – tropical depressions Eight, Nine, and Twelve, Tropical Storm Hope, and hurricanes Flossie and Greta. During the month of October, there were five tropical cyclones, with two unnumbered tropical depressions, tropical storms Irma and Juliet, and Hurricane Kendra. There was another unnumbered tropical depression in November, which dissipated on November 5.

The season's activity was reflected with an accumulated cyclone energy (ACE) rating of 63. ACE is a metric used to express the energy used by a tropical cyclone during its lifetime. Therefore, a storm with a longer duration will have high values of ACE. It is only calculated at six-hour increments in which specific tropical and subtropical systems are either at or above sustained wind speeds of 39 mph (63 km/h), which is the threshold for tropical storm intensity.

== Systems ==
=== Unnamed subtropical storm ===
- Subtropical storm (SSHWS)
- Duration: January 18 – January 23
- Peak intensity: 45 mph (75 km/h) (1-min); 1002 mbar (hPa)

In the middle of January, an upper-level trough in the westerlies spawned a surface low-pressure area to the east-northeast of the Lesser Antilles and to the south of a subtropical ridge. Isolated from the detrimental effects of the westerlies, it was initially non-tropical in nature and intensified through a baroclinic energy source, or one that derives energy from the interaction of cold and warm air. Convection increased slightly despite cool sea surface temperatures of around 75 °F (24 °C). At 1200 UTC on January 18, it organized into a subtropical depression about 1,725 mi (2,776 km) east-northeast of Puerto Rico while moving in a general westward track, which it would maintain for much of its duration. The National Hurricane Center (NHC) initiated Dvorak classifications on the cyclone at 0000 UTC on January 19, assessing a Dvorak number of T2.5, suggesting both tropical and subtropical characteristics. On the same day, the pressure gradient between the storm and the ridge produced gale-force winds. By early on January 20, the storm maintained minimal convection near its center, with its primary rainband revolved in a cyclonic formation around its well-defined center. Later that day, the storm strengthened into a subtropical storm and attained peak winds of 45 mph (72 km/h), supported by both ship and Hurricane Hunters reports.

After the storm maintained peak winds for about 36 hours, the outer rainbands to the south and east of the center began diminishing late on January 21, which began a weakening trend. At around that time, the cyclone was moving west-southwestward, and within 72 hours was forecast by one hurricane forecast model to be located over Hispaniola. By midday on January 22, the winds decreased to below gale force after the convection dissipated near the center. Subsequently, it turned more to the west away from land, and by January 23 the circulation degenerated into a remnant trough about 185 mi (298 km) north of the Lesser Antilles. The storm was one of six tropical or subtropical cyclones on record to be active in the month of January, and one of four to have formed in the month.

=== Tropical Storm Amelia ===
- Tropical storm (SSHWS)
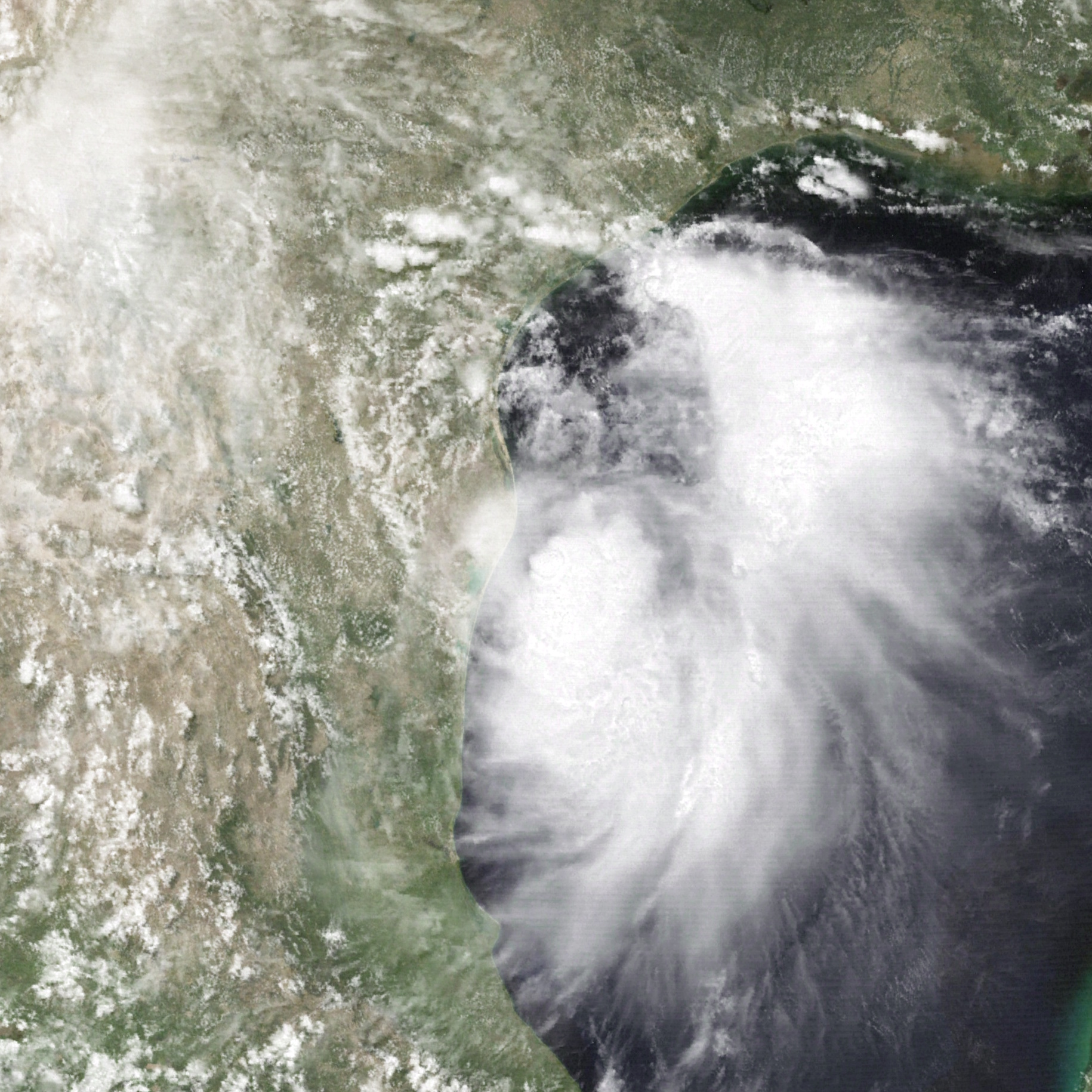
- Duration: July 30 – August 1
- Peak intensity: 50 mph (85 km/h) (1-min); 1005 mbar (hPa)

A tropical wave emerged into the Atlantic Ocean from the west coast of Africa on July 19. The wave did not develop significantly while crossing the Atlantic Ocean and Caribbean Sea. The disturbance then entered an area of the Gulf of Mexico that was conducive to tropical cyclogenesis and became a tropical depression while located about 30 mi (48 km) south of Brownsville, Texas on July 30. Despite its proximity to land, the depression strengthened into Tropical Storm Amelia on July 31 and peaked with winds of 50 mph (80 km/h). Around that time, Amelia made landfall near Port Isabel, Texas. Later on July 31, the storm weakened to a tropical depression and dissipated early the following day.

Amelia affected the Texas coast for two days, causing several shipping incidents and minor damage in Corpus Christi and South Padre Island. While active, there were no deaths linked to the storm. However, the biggest impact from the storm followed its dissipation, when its remnants contributed to record rainfall totals over the state. The state, already suffering from a previous drought, believed that the rain would help alleviate the conditions. However, the dry ground aided the flooding from the storm. The rainfall caused several rivers and creeks to flood, especially around the Texas Hill Country and northern Texas, leading to severe damage. Overall, Amelia caused 33 fatalities with an estimated $110 million in damages.

=== Tropical Storm Bess ===
- Tropical storm (SSHWS)
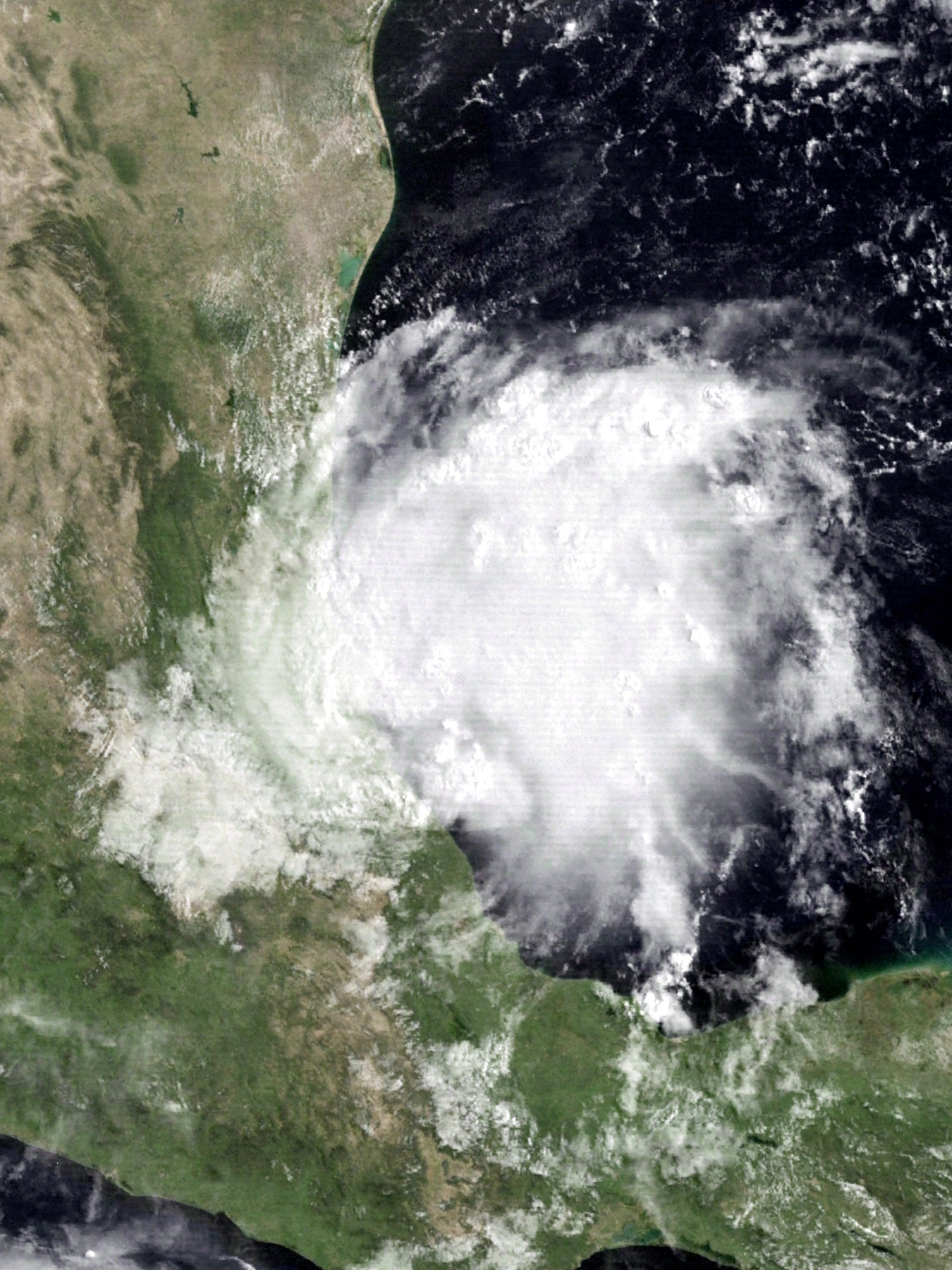
- Duration: August 6 – August 8
- Peak intensity: 50 mph (85 km/h) (1-min); 1005 mbar (hPa)

A low-pressure area developed in Georgia along a dissipating cold front on August 1. The system detached from the cold front and drifted southwestward, reaching northeastern Gulf of Mexico on August 3. Satellite imagery, buoys, and reconnaissance aircraft flights indicated that by August 5, the system likely acquired a closed circulation. Thus, the National Hurricane Center estimated that a tropical depression developed in the central Gulf of Mexico at 1200 UTC that day. On August 6, a reconnaissance flight into the depression resulted in an upgrade to Tropical Storm Bess, while located about 250 mi (400 km) southeast of Brownsville, Texas. The storm had initially headed west-southwestward at 8 mph (13 km/h), before moving southwestward at nearly the same speed.

At 1200 UTC on August 7, Bess attained its minimum barometric pressure of 1,005 mbar (29.7 inHg). Thereafter, Bess began to turn nearly due southward under the influence of a high-pressure area over southern Texas. Later on August 7, the storm reached its maximum sustained winds of 50 mph (80 km/h). Early on August 8, Bess made landfall near Nautla, Veracruz, at the same intensity and then rapidly dissipated inland. In Tuxpan, Veracruz and Tampico, Tamaulipas, sustained winds reached only 29 mph (47 km/h). The storm also produced heavy rainfall, peaking at 12.04 in (306 mm) in La Estrella. However, no flooding occurred and no damage or fatalities were reported. Its remnants emerged into the Pacific Ocean, leading to the formation of Hurricane Iva.

=== Hurricane Cora ===
- Category 1 hurricane (SSHWS)
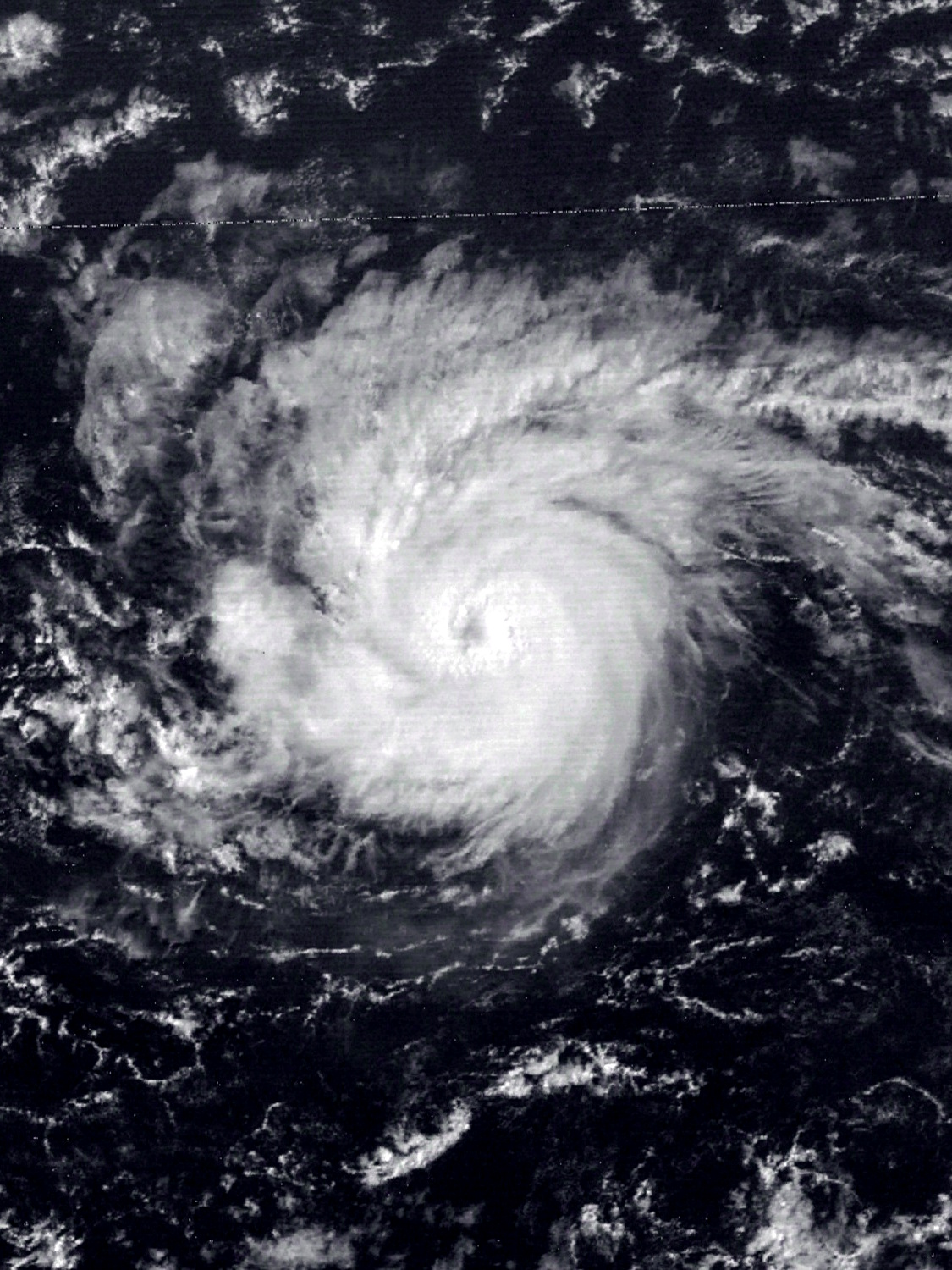
- Duration: August 7 – August 12
- Peak intensity: 90 mph (150 km/h) (1-min); 980 mbar (hPa)

On August 4, a disturbance exited the west coast of Africa and moved quickly westward within the Intertropical Convergence Zone. Two days later, the system broke away from the ICTZ, when it started organizing. It developed into Tropical Depression Three late on August 7. A day later it intensified into Tropical Storm Cora on August 8. The storm quickly intensified and developed a well-defined eye feature. The NHC upgraded Cora to hurricane status, marking only the second time that an Atlantic hurricane was upgraded solely based on satellite photography; the first was Doris in 1975. The NHC estimated that Cora attained peak winds of 90 mph (145 km/h) early on August 9. For much of its duration, Cora moved quickly to the west-southwest toward the Lesser Antilles. Possibly as a result of the fast forward motion, the hurricane weakened soon after reaching its peak intensity, dropping to tropical storm status on August 10. That day, a Hurricane Hunter aircraft encountered the weakening storm. Cora struck the island of Grenada on August 11 while weakening to a tropical depression. Cora degenerated into a tropical wave on August 12 in the eastern Caribbean. The remnant crossed over Central America into the Pacific Ocean, where it regenerated into Hurricane Kristy.

While passing through the Lesser Antilles, Cora produced wind gusts to 45 mph (72 km/h), along with light rainfall in Barbados and Saint Lucia. In the latter, a person died after stepping on a high tension power line that was downed in Castries. Approximately two to four percent of trees on the island were toppled. Although it remained far to the south, Hurricane Cora affected weather conditions that reached as far north as Presque Isle, Maine, where balloonists Ben Abruzzo, Maxie Anderson, and Larry Newman were preparing to make the first ever transatlantic balloon flight on the Double Eagle II. The winds created by Cora's influence would give the hot air balloon the northerly push required for takeoff.

=== Tropical Storm Debra ===
- Tropical storm (SSHWS)
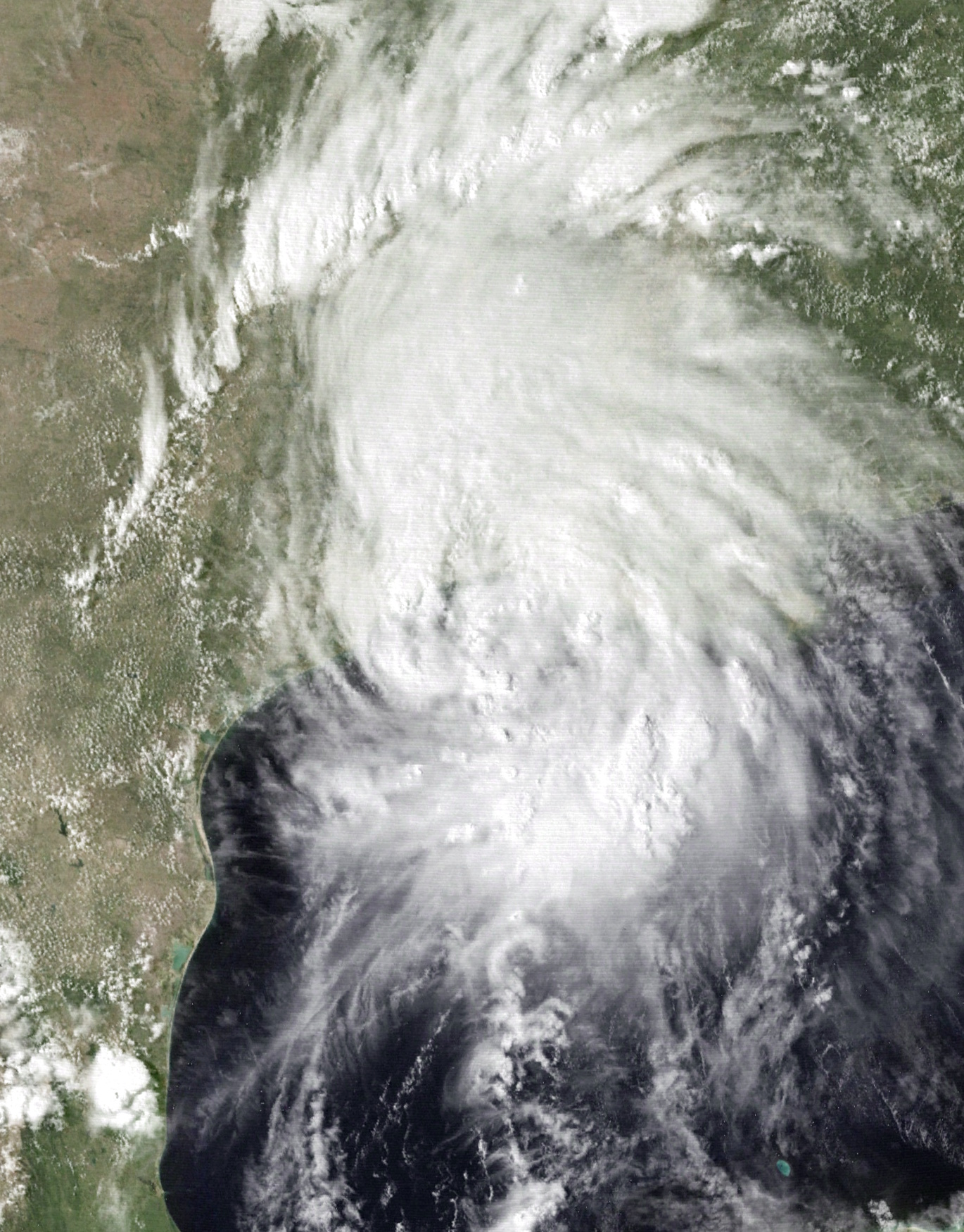
- Duration: August 26 – August 29
- Peak intensity: 60 mph (95 km/h) (1-min); 1000 mbar (hPa)

An upper-level cold-core low pressure system developed over southwestern Florida in late August. The low moved southwest towards the Yucatán Peninsula over the next day, as a tropical wave drifted westwards from the Caribbean Sea. The interaction between the upper-level system and the wave led to the formation of a tropical depression on August 26 around 460 miles (740 km) south of New Orleans. At first the depression drifted westward but, as the western periphery of a high-pressure area weakened, it tracked towards the north and slowly strengthened. After a reconnaissance aircraft found surface winds of 45 mph (70 km/h) on August 28, the depression was upgraded to Tropical Storm Debra. While Debra approached the coast of Louisiana, its pressure dropped to pressure to 1000 mbar (hPa; 29.53 inHg), while the winds peaked at 60 mph (100 km/h) at 00:00 UTC on August 29. The storm made landfall between Beaumont, Texas, and Lake Charles, Louisiana, on August 28. The low crossed Louisiana into Arkansas, merging with a frontal trough on August 29; the frontal wave drifted into southern Illinois and traveled eastbound into the Ohio Valley for the next three days.

Oil companies evacuated about 1,000 employees from offshore oil rigs in Texas and Louisiana. One person died while attempting to evacuate an oil rig to the south of Cameron, Louisiana. More than 6,000 people evacuated from coastal areas of Louisiana. In Louisiana, rainfall peaked at 10.81 in (275 mm) in Freshwater Bayou. There was flooding in Rapides Parish. Five tornadoes were reported from the system in Texas, Louisiana, and Mississippi shortly after Debra's landfall. (Note: Tornadoes were confirmed in Texas, Louisiana, Mississippi, Arkansas, and Tennessee.) A tornado spawned in Turkey Creek, Mississippi, destroyed three mobile homes and a house, killing one person and seriously injuring another; this tornado tracked on to Crystal Springs, Mississippi. A confirmed tornado at the Ike settlement in Vernon Parish, knocked over a trailer. Wind gusts reached 70 miles per hour (110 km/h) in Grand Chenier, which downed tree and damaged roofs. Tides at Lake Pontchartrain were 2 feet (0.61 m) to 3 feet (0.91 m) above normal. One person was hurt in the Memphis tornado. Power was knocked out at four blocks of the Memphis International Airport, gas supplies were cut off in Memphis, and downed trees and power poles blocked many streets.

=== Hurricane Ella ===
- Category 4 hurricane (SSHWS)
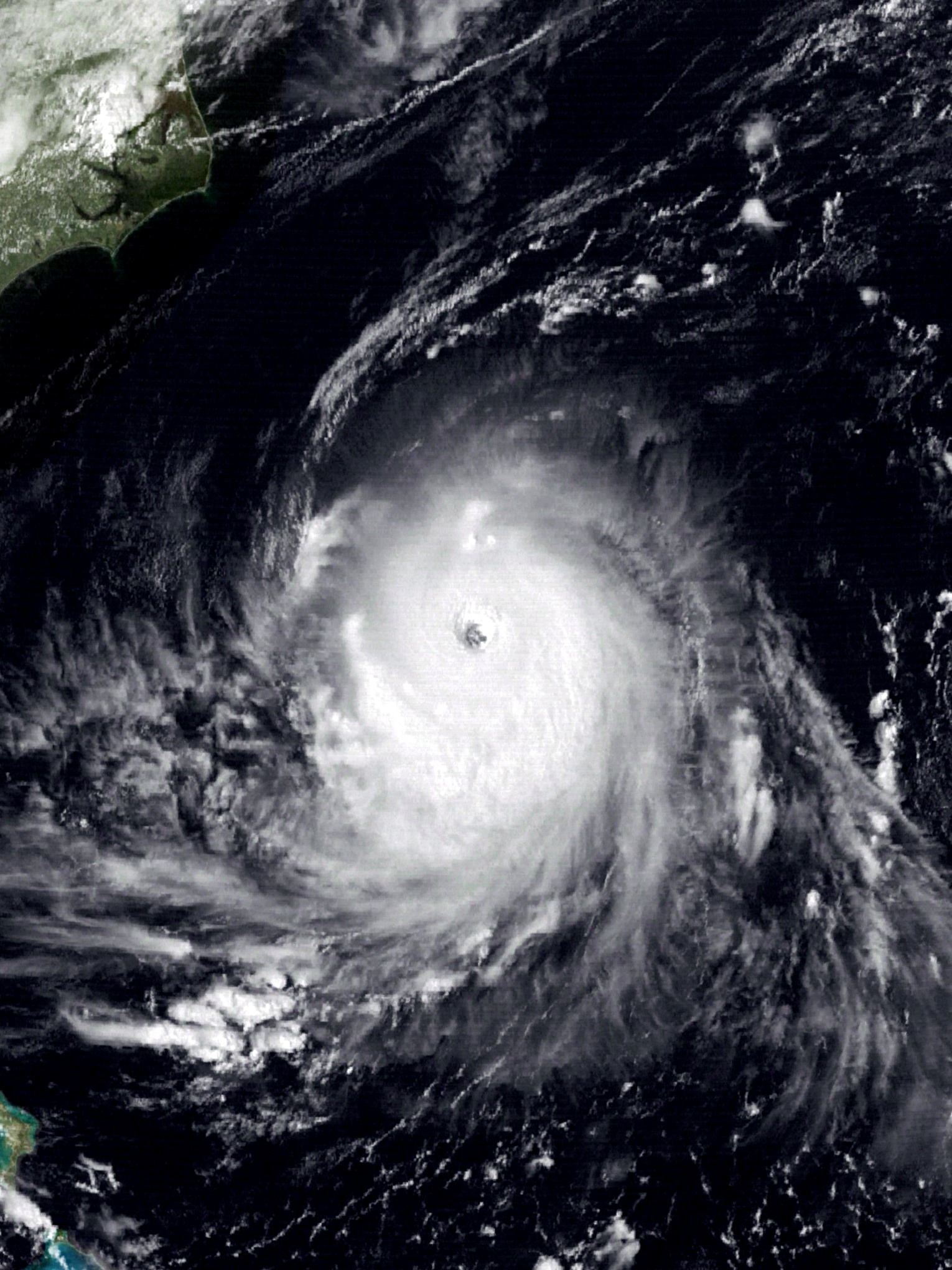
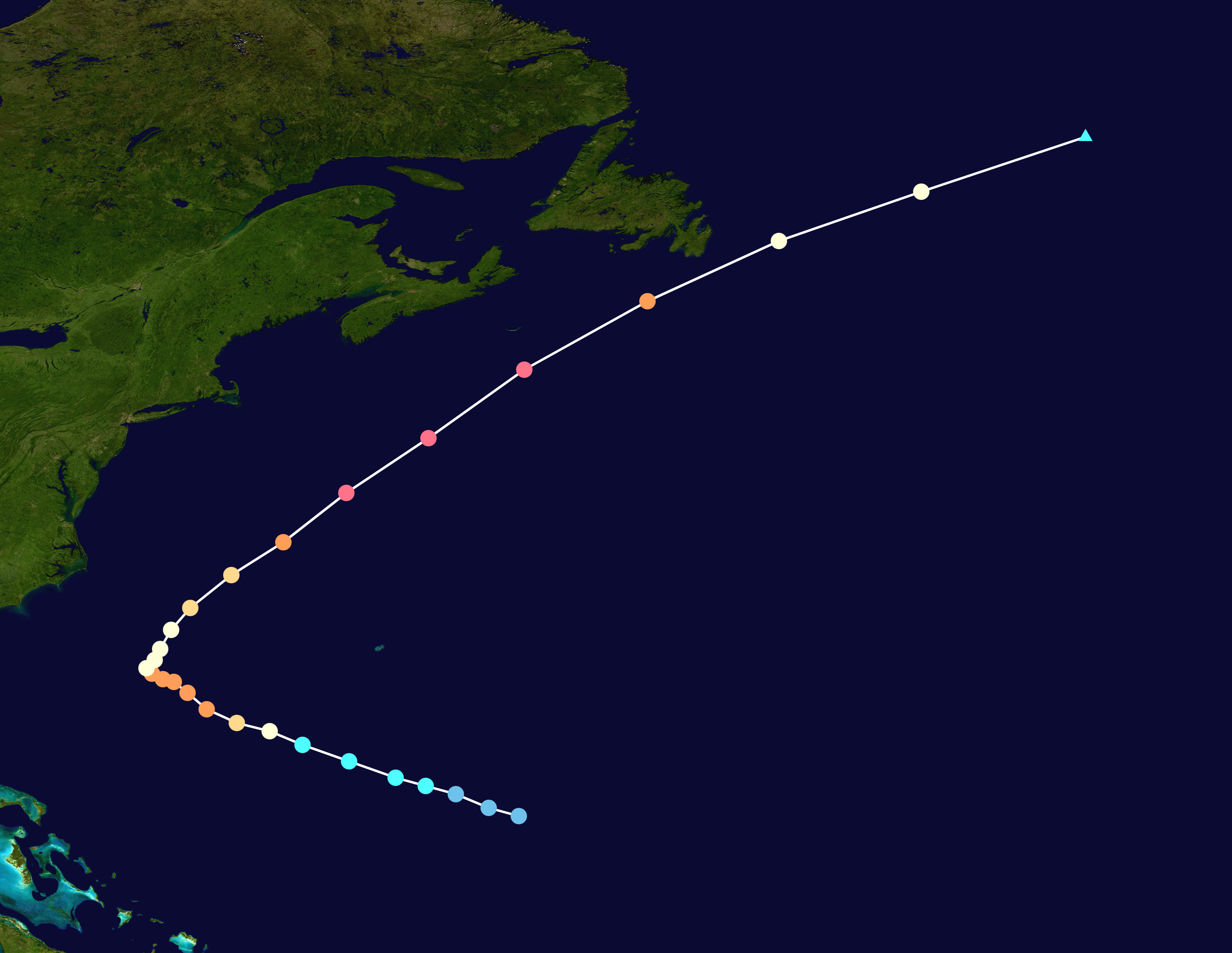
- Duration: August 30 – September 5
- Peak intensity: 140 mph (220 km/h) (1-min); 956 mbar (hPa)

Towards the end of August, a cold front stalled and dissipated across the western Atlantic Ocean, which spawned a tropical disturbance southeast of Bermuda on August 28. It developed into a tropical depression on August 30, about 520 miles (840 km) south-southeast of Bermuda. Located to the south of a subtropical ridge, the depression tracked steadily west-northwestward, becoming Tropical Storm Ella 18 hours later. The storm reached hurricane status late on August 31, based on confirmation from nearby ship reports and a Hurricane Hunters flight. On September 1, Ella reached a preliminary peak intensity of 125 mph (201 km/h). At the same time, an approaching short-wave trough caused the hurricane to decelerate and turn slightly to the north, bringing it just off the east coast of North Carolina. Ella's winds dropped to minimal hurricane status as the convection diminished. After stalling for about 24 hours, Ella turned and accelerated to the northeast, steered by another trough. The hurricane began to significantly re-intensify. Early on September 4, Ella again reached major hurricane status, and later that day it peaked with winds of 140 mph (230 km/h); at the time it was about 335 miles (539 km) south of Halifax, Nova Scotia, and its peak winds were measured by Hurricane Hunters. This made it the strongest hurricane ever recorded in Canadian waters. Weakening began immediately after peak intensity due to cooler water temperatures. Early on September 5, Ella passed very near Cape Race, although the strongest winds were south and east of the center. Associated convection became completely removed from the center, and the hurricane became extratropical as it was absorbed by a larger mid-latitude system.

The hurricane prompted a hurricane watch for the Outer Banks of North Carolina during Labor Day Weekend, resulting in a significant decrease in tourism. Due to the threat, campgrounds on Ocracoke Island and Cape Lookout, each only accessible by ferry, were closed to reduce their populations. Hurricane Ella produced waves of 5 to 9 feet (1.5 to 2.7 metres) in height, as well as rip currents along the coast. This caused some minor beach erosion, but the depleted sand returned within a few days. Prior to the storm's arrival, the Newfoundland Weather Forecast Office issued a hurricane warning for southeastern Newfoundland. The ferry between Nova Scotia and Newfoundland was disrupted, and boats across the region were sent back to harbor. Rainfall was fairly light, peaking at 2.39 inches (61 mm) in southeastern Newfoundland, and sustained winds reached 71 mph (114 km/h) at Cape Race.

=== Hurricane Flossie ===
- Category 2 hurricane (SSHWS)
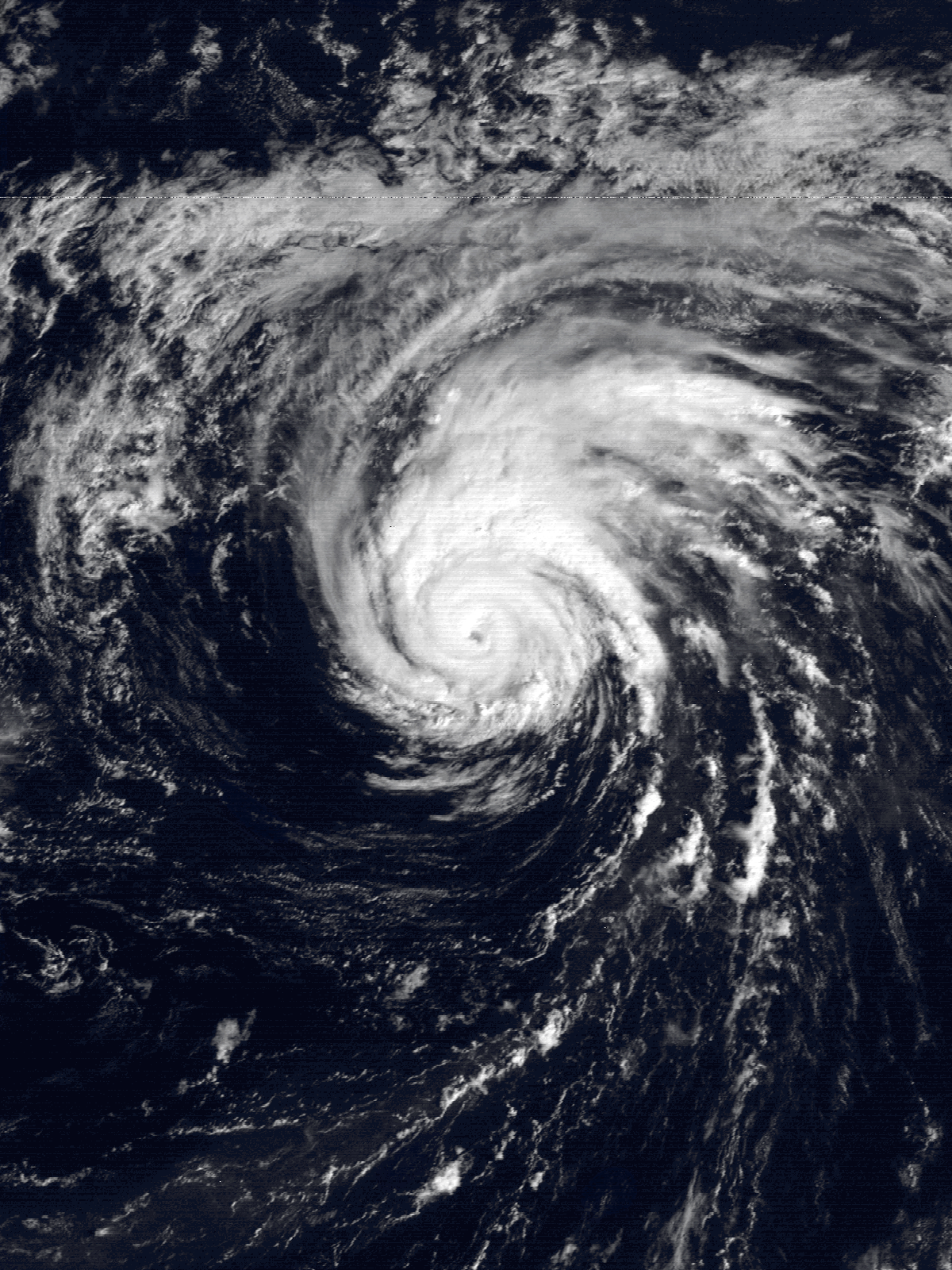
- Duration: September 4 – September 15
- Peak intensity: 100 mph (155 km/h) (1-min); 976 mbar (hPa)

A tropical wave passed westward across Dakar, Senegal on August 31 and entered the Atlantic Ocean later that day. Convection markedly increased over the next few days and by 0000 UTC on September 4, the wave developed into a tropical depression while located about midway between Africa and the Lesser Antilles. Later that day, the Hong Kong Merchant reported tropical storm force winds, thus the depression was upgraded to Tropical Storm Flossie. It initially tracked northwestward at 23 mph (37 km/h) and minimal strengthening occurred, possibly due to rapid forward speeds. On September 5, the storm curved westward, until turning north on September 7. A high-pressure area transitioned into a trough, causing Flossie to re-curve northeastward and generating strong upper-level winds.

On September 8, Flossie was downgraded to a tropical depression. After the trough began weakening, favorable conditions returned, allowing Flossie to re-strengthen into a tropical storm on September 10. Flossie then decelerated and became nearly stationary on September 12. Around that time, the storm was upgraded to a hurricane. Further intensification continued, and Flossie peaked with winds of 100 mph (160 km/h) early on September 13. The storm began turned nearly due northward and began weakening. Flossie accelerated to the northeast and eventually transitioned into an extratropical cyclone while 700 miles (1,100 km) north of the Azores on September 15. The strong extratropical cyclone brought winds as high as 104 mph (167 km/h) to Fair Isle, Great Britain.

=== Hurricane Greta ===
- Category 4 hurricane (SSHWS)
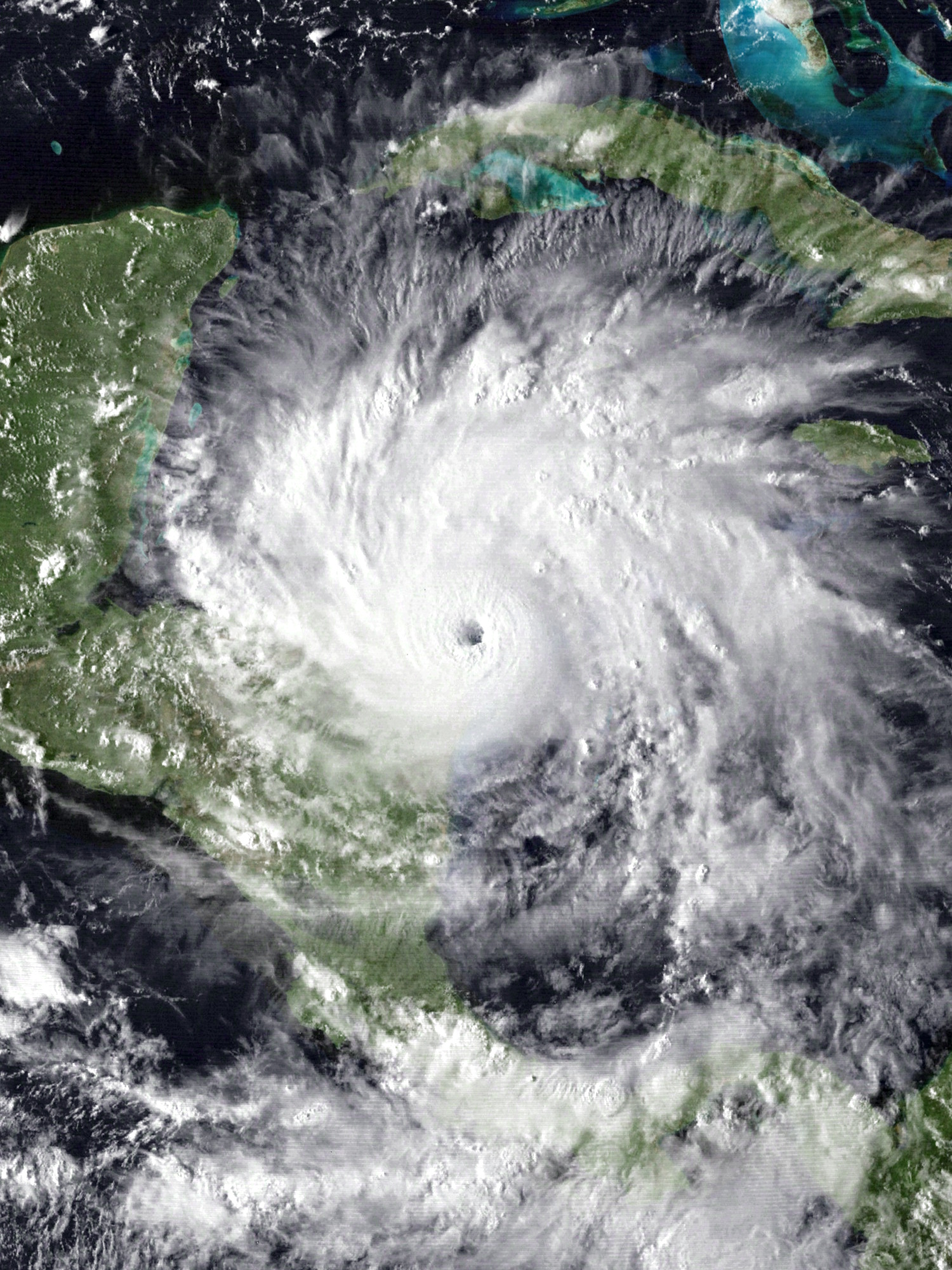
- Duration: September 13 – September 20 (Exited basin)
- Peak intensity: 130 mph (215 km/h) (1-min); 947 mbar (hPa)

A tropical wave developed into a tropical depression near Trinidad on September 13. By the following day, the depression strengthened into Tropical Storm Greta. It headed westward to west-northwestward across the Caribbean Sea and slowly intensified, becoming a hurricane on September 16. The rate of intensification increased as Greta was approaching the northwestern Caribbean Sea. Greta briefly peaked as a Category 4 hurricane with maximum sustained winds of 130 mph (210 km/h) and a minimum barometric pressure of 947 mbar (28.0 inHg), while brushing northeastern Honduras. Although the storm remained offshore, land interaction caused significant weakening. On September 19, Greta made landfall in Stann Creek District, Belize with winds of 110 mph (180 km/h). The storm rapidly weakened inland over Central America, but survived its passage and eventually became Hurricane Olivia in the Eastern Pacific Ocean.

Early in its duration, Greta produced heavy rainfall in the Netherlands Antilles. With a similar path to Hurricane Fifi four years prior, Greta threatened to reproduce the devastating effects of the catastrophic storm; however, damage and loss of life was significantly less than feared. In Honduras, about 1,200 homes were damaged, about half of which in towns along the coastline. The storm damaged about 75% of the houses on Roatán along the offshore Bay Islands, and there was one death in the country. In the Belize Barrier Reef, Greta downed trees and produced high waves, while on the mainland, there was minimal flooding despite a high storm surge. In Dangriga where it made landfall, the hurricane damaged or destroyed 125 houses and the primary hospital. In Belize City, a tornado flipped over a truck and damaged four houses. Damage in Belize was estimated at $25 million, and there were four deaths.

=== Tropical Storm Hope ===
- Tropical storm (SSHWS)
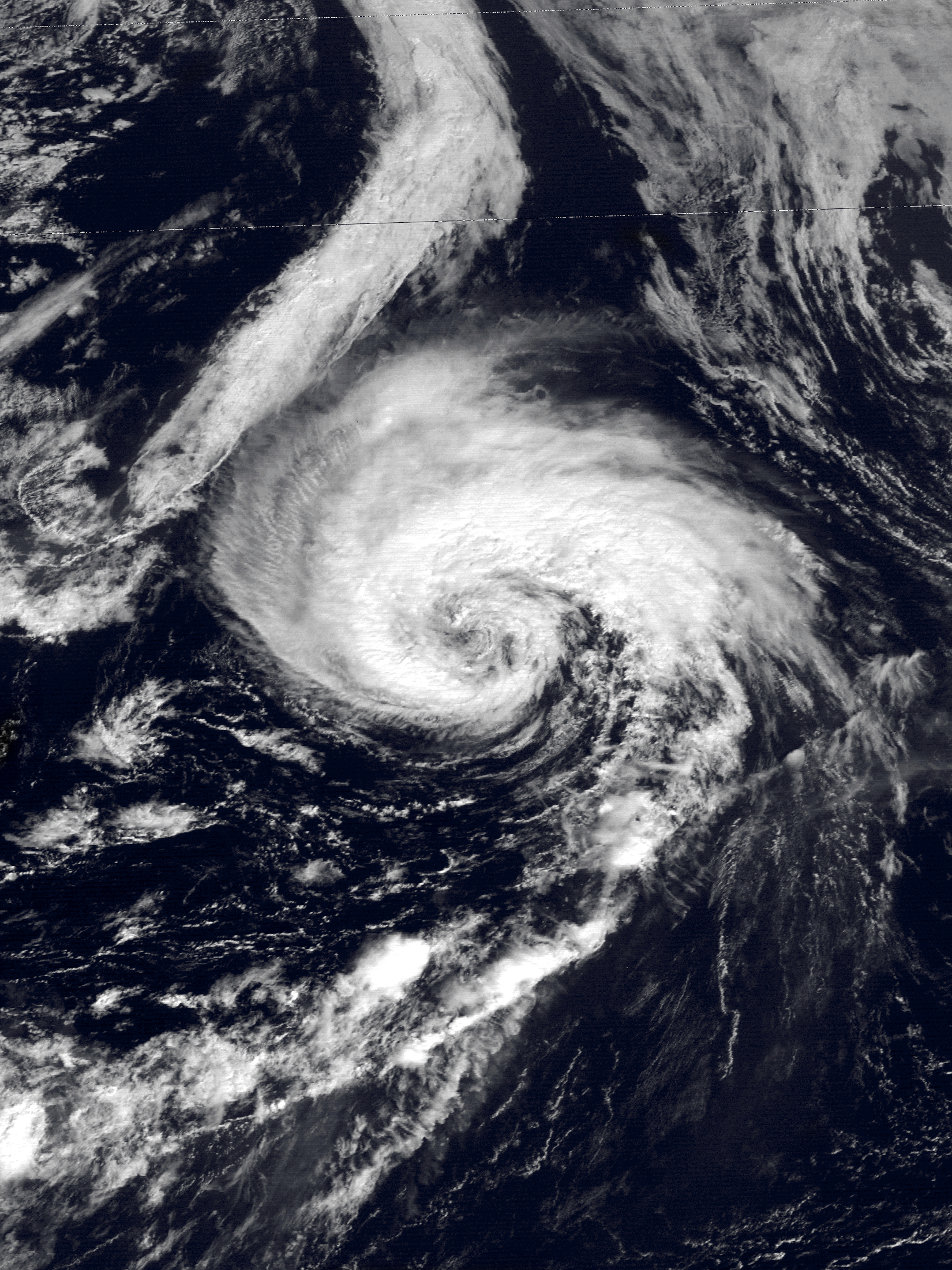
- Duration: September 12 – September 21
- Peak intensity: 65 mph (100 km/h) (1-min); 987 mbar (hPa)

A mid-tropospheric low-pressure area developed over the Southeastern United States on September 10. The system developed into a subtropical depression early on September 12, while located about 75 mi (121 km) east of St. Augustine, Florida. Over the next few days, the depression tracked east-northeastward to eastward. While strengthening into a subtropical storm on September 15, it passed just north of Bermuda, but produced only 1.07 in (27 mm) of rain on the island. The storm then made a brief dip to the east-southeast, before resuming its east-northeastward course on September 16. Beginning on the following day, satellite imagery indicated that the system was acquiring tropical characteristics. As a result, it was reclassified as Tropical Storm Hope at 0600 UTC on September 17.

Because Hope remained out of range of reconnaissance aircraft flights, the National Hurricane Center relied on ships and satellite estimates. After becoming a tropical cyclone, Hope began to accelerate while slowly intensifying. Satellite estimates at 1200 UTC on September 19 indicated that the storm attained its peak intensity with maximum sustained winds of 65 mph (105 km/h) and a minimum pressure of 987 mbar (29.1 inHg), recorded by the S.S. Banglar Mann. While located hundreds of miles north of the Azores on September 20, the storm turned northward and began crossing into sea surface temperatures of 68 °F (20 °C). By 1200 UTC on September 21, Hope transitioned into an extratropical cyclone and was absorbed by another extratropical storm while situated about 220 mi (350 km) south of Reykjavík, Iceland.

=== Tropical Storm Irma ===
- Tropical storm (SSHWS)
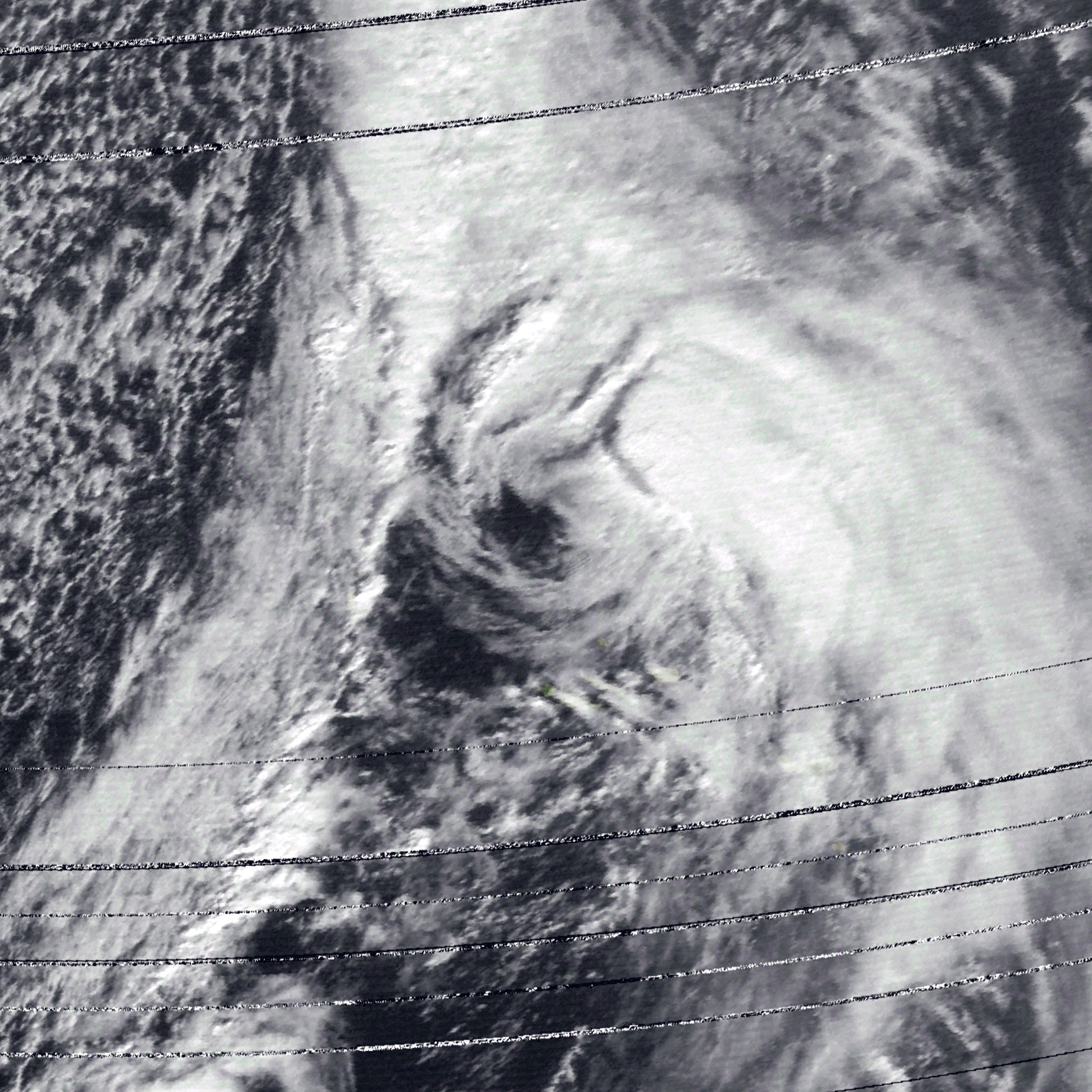
- Duration: October 2 – October 5
- Peak intensity: 50 mph (85 km/h) (1-min); 998 mbar (hPa)

The origins of Tropical Storm Irma were from a subtropical depression that formed about 500 mi (800 km) south of the Azores on October 2. During the next two days, thunderstorm activity gradually increased around the circulation center as the storm drifted northward. On October 2, the storm had taken the appearance of a tropical storm on satellite photographs, and upper-level anticyclonic flow over the center of the storm was evident on satellite time-lapse movies. By the afternoon of October 4, the system had acquired the characteristics of a tropical storm and was named Irma; gale-force winds extended 150 mi (240 km) from the center of circulation.

Six hours after being named, Irma reached its peak intensity of 50 mph (80 km/h). On October 5, Irma turned towards the north-northeast and passed about midway between the central and western Azores. Shortly thereafter, Irma became less organized, and that evening was absorbed into an approaching cold front, about 450 mi (720 km) northeast of the Azores. Although Irma passed near parts of the western and central Azores with gale-force winds in some areas, no reports of damage or casualties caused by Irma were received. Several nearby ships reported winds around 46 mph (74 km/h). It was noted that heavy rains may have occurred on some of the mountainous islands as Irma passed.

=== Tropical Storm Juliet ===
- Tropical storm (SSHWS)
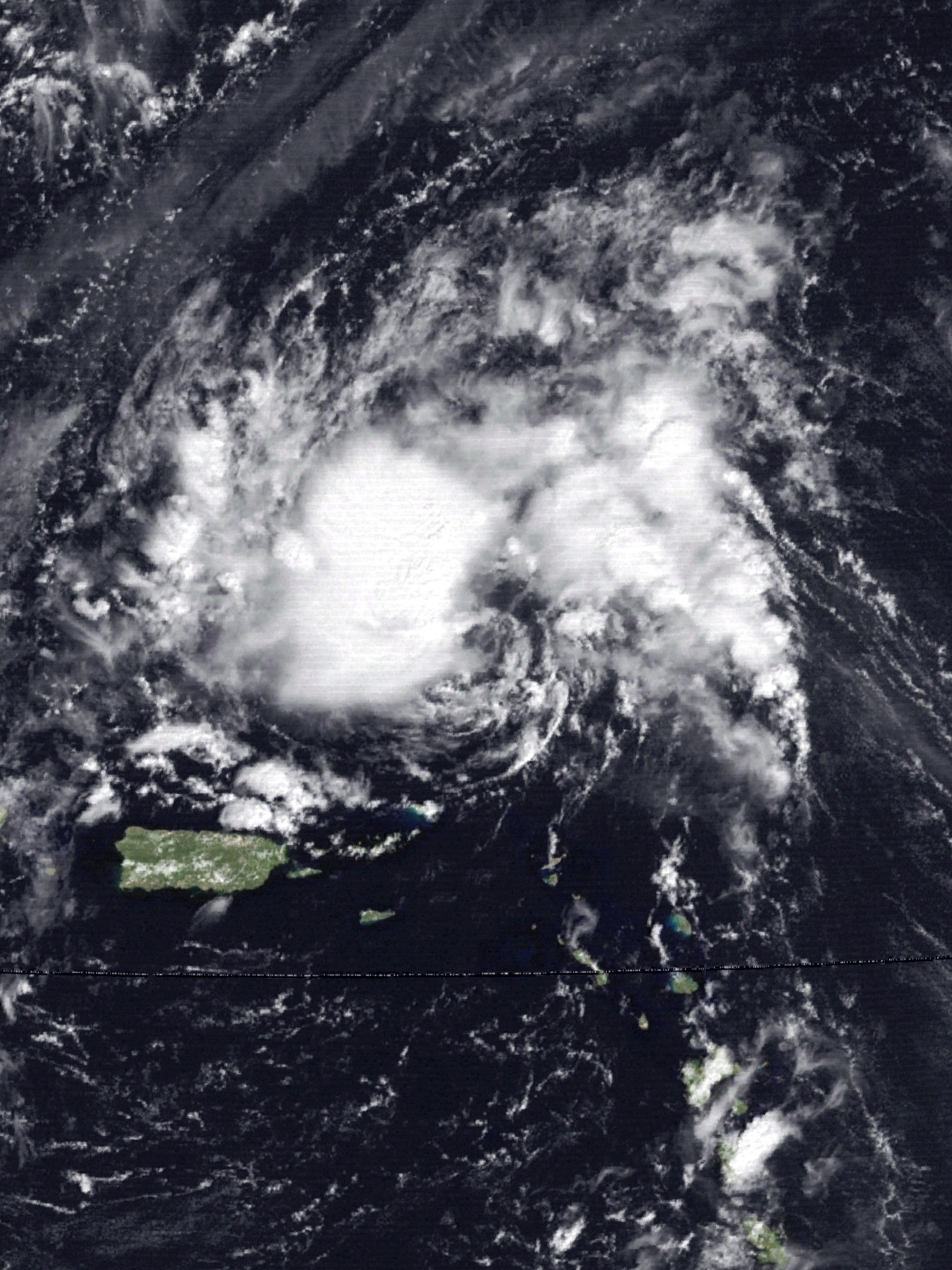
- Duration: October 7 – October 11
- Peak intensity: 50 mph (85 km/h) (1-min); 1006 mbar (hPa)

A weak tropical wave emerged into the Atlantic Ocean from the west coast of Africa on September 30. The wave moved west-northwestward and was centered well east of the Leeward Islands on October 6, when satellite imagery indicated that deep convection became much more concentrated. The following day, ship reports noted that a closed circulation was developing. The system was classified as a tropical depression beginning at 1800 UTC on October 7, while located about 600 mi (970 km) east of Puerto Rico. Around midday on October 8, the depression strengthened into Tropical Storm Juliet.

After peaking with maximum sustained winds of 50 mph (80 km/h) and a minimum barometric pressure of 1,006 mbar (29.7 inHg) early on October 9, Juliet passed north of Puerto Rico. The storm brought light rainfall to the island, peaking at 4.51 in (115 mm) at Toro Negro Plant. The storm then accelerated and curved northwestward, northward, and then northeastward. On October 11, Juliet merged with a frontal zone, while located west-southwest of Bermuda. Later that day, the remnants moved across the island and produced up to 3 in (76 mm) of rainfall.

=== Hurricane Kendra ===
- Category 1 hurricane (SSHWS)
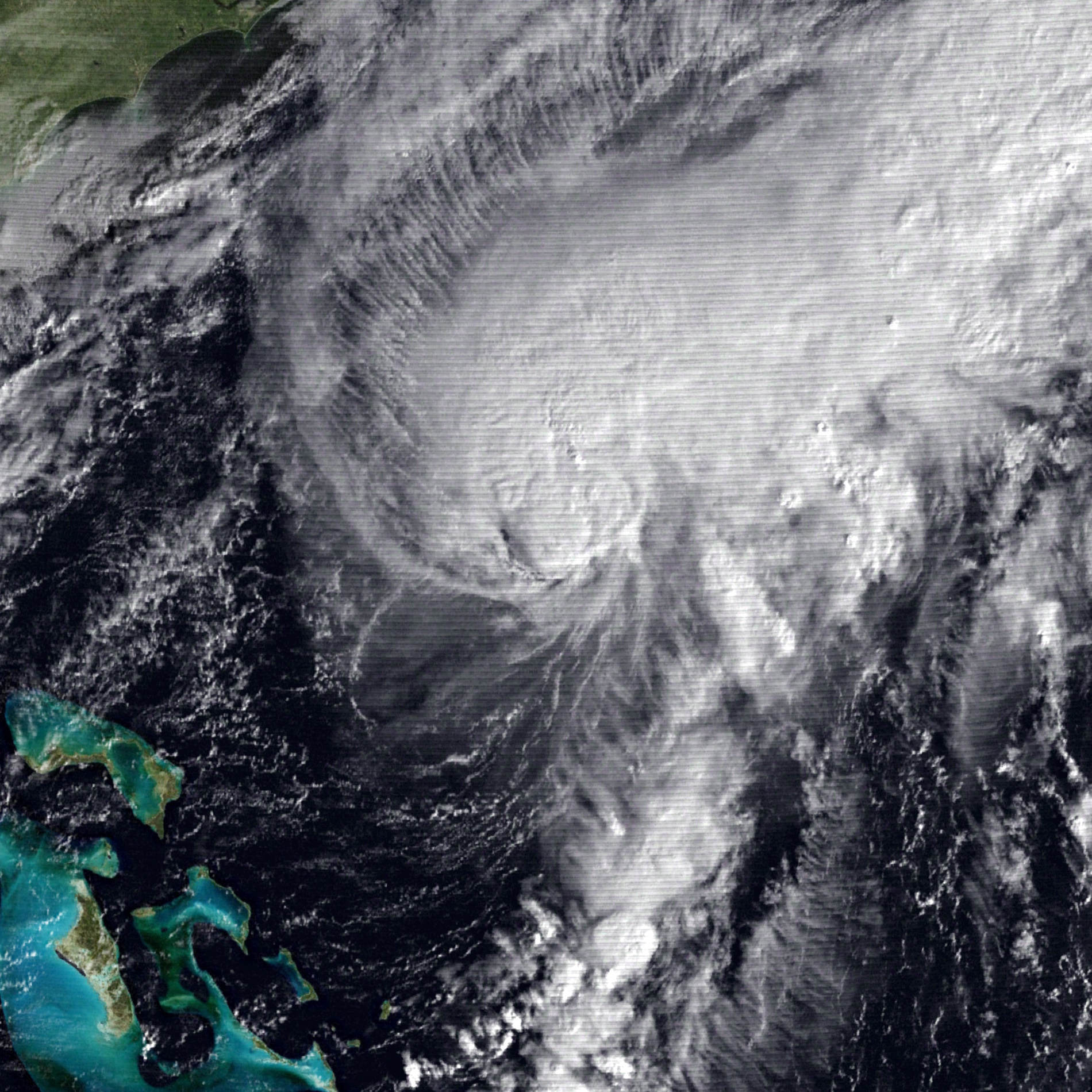
- Duration: October 28 – November 1
- Peak intensity: 80 mph (130 km/h) (1-min); 990 mbar (hPa)

In late October, a tropical wave and an area of disturbed weather combined in the northwestern Caribbean, before crossing Puerto Rico. The system moved northwest and by late on October 28, it became a tropical depression while located about 80 miles (130 km) north of Mayaguana in The Bahamas. Early on the following day, it strengthened into Tropical Storm Kendra. The storm quickly intensified while moving either north or north-northwestward and became a hurricane late on October 29. After peaking with winds of 80 mph (130 km/h) on October 30, Kendra weakened significantly to a 50 mph (80 km/h) tropical storm in only 12 hours. Kendra continued north-northeastward or northeastward, before being absorbed by an extratropical cyclone while located west-northwest of Bermuda early on November 1.

The precursor system dropped rainfall across much of southern Puerto Rico was at least 7 in (180 mm), with a peak at 20.43 in (519 mm) in Pico del Este. Mudslides and flooding from the heavy precipitation left many roads impassable, washed out or collapsed several bridges, and caused considerable damage to agriculture, especially livestock. Additionally, one fatality occurred and 1,710 families fled their homes for shelters. Damage in Puerto Rico reached $6 million. A high-pressure area and Kendra combined produced strong winds and abnormally high tides along the East Coast of the United States, though no damage was reported.

=== Other systems ===
In addition to the 12 other tropical cyclones, there were several tropical depressions that developed during the season. The first of which formed over the central Gulf of Mexico on June 21. The depression moved northeastward toward Florida and strengthened slightly. It dissipated by late on June 22. Another tropical depression developed about 175 mi (282 km) southwest of Porto Novo, Cape Verde on July 10. The system moved generally westward and intensified into a strong tropical depression, before dissipating two days later. Tropical Depression Four formed about 465 mi (748 km) east of Barbados on August 7. It tracked westward without significantly intensifying, and passed through the Windward Islands over Bequia on the following day. The depression continued westward and passed near Aruba on August 9. It eventually traversed the Caribbean Sea, and made landfall to the south of Bluefields, Nicaragua on August 11. The depression dissipated shortly thereafter.

A tropical depression formed in the central Gulf of Mexico on August 9. The storm moved northward and struck southeastern Plaquemines Parish, Louisiana before dissipating the next day. By August 30, another depression developed in the north-central Gulf of Mexico. The system tracked generally eastward and avoided landfall. It dissipated around midday on September 1. Tropical Depression Eight developed over western Senegal around 1200 UTC on September 3. The depression initially headed west-southwestward and soon entered the Atlantic Ocean. Between late on September 4 and early on September 5, the system passed south of Cape Verde. Later that day, the storm began curving west-northwestward. By early on September 7, it was heading northwestward and then turned to the north-northwest the next day. The depression moved northward between September 9 and September 10, before re-curving to the northeast. It dissipated about 440 mi (710 km) of Flores Island in the Azores around midday on September 11.

At 1200 UTC on September 8, Tropical Depression Nine developed over the west-central Gulf of Mexico. Moving generally westward, the depression made landfall south of La Pesca, Tamaulipas, around midday on September 10. The system rapidly weakened inland and dissipated later that day. Another tropical depression formed over western Senegal on September 18. It moved westward across the Atlantic Ocean before curving west-northwestward about three days later. On September 25, the depression moved northwestward and then northward by September 28. It dissipated about 550 mi (890 km) east-northeast of Bermuda at 1200 UTC the following day. The next tropical depression developed in the Gulf of Mexico just offshore Campeche on September 21. Moving west-northwestward, the depression made landfall near Tampico on September 23, shortly before dissipating.

A tropical depression formed at 1200 UTC on October 13, while located about 55 mi (89 km) north of Corvo Island in the Azores. The depression initially moved south-southwestward, before curving southwestward by the following day. It then turned west-northwestward on October 15. Late the next day, the depression turned abruptly northward. The system dissipated about 500 mi (800 km) west-northwest of Flores Island. The next tropical depression developed at 1200 UTC on October 26, while located about 490 mi (790 km) south-southwest of the southernmost islands of Cape Verde. It moved generally westward and dissipated about halfway between the Lesser Antilles and the west coast of Africa on October 29. The final tropical depression of the season formed about 265 mi (426 km) northeast of North Abaco in the Bahamas on November 3. Moving north-northeastward, the depression turned northeastward by the next day. It dissipated about 275 mi (443 km) east of Virginia Beach, Virginia on November 5.

== Storm names ==
The following list of names was used for named storms that formed in the North Atlantic in 1978. Storms were named Amelia, Bess, Cora, Flossie, Hope, Irma, and Juliet for the first time in 1978. This was the last Atlantic hurricane season to utilize only female names for tropical storms. A new set of six annual lists utilizing both female and male names came into use in 1979.

- Amelia
- Bess
- Cora
- Debra
- Ella
- Flossie
- Greta
- Hope
- Irma
- Juliet
- Kendra
- Louise (unused)
- Martha (unused)
- Noreen (unused)
- Ora (unused)
- Paula (unused)
- Rosalie (unused)
- Susan (unused)
- Tanya (unused)
- Vanessa (unused)
- Wanda (unused)

=== Retirement ===
The name Greta was retired after the 1978 season.

== Season effects ==
This is a table of all of the storms that formed in the 1978 Atlantic hurricane season. It includes their name, duration, peak classification and intensities, areas affected, damage, and death totals. Deaths in parentheses are additional and indirect (an example of an indirect death would be a traffic accident), but were still related to that storm. Damage and deaths include totals while the storm was extratropical, a wave, or a low, and all of the damage figures are in 1978 USD.

Saffir–Simpson scale
| TD | TS | C1 | C2 | C3 | C4 | C5 |

1978 North Atlantic tropical cyclone season statistics
| Storm name | Dates active | Storm category at peak intensity | Max 1-min wind mph (km/h) | Min. press. (mbar) | Areas affected | Damage (US$) | Deaths | Ref(s). |
|---|---|---|---|---|---|---|---|---|
| Unnamed | January 18–23 | Subtropical storm | 45 (75) | 1002 | None | None | None | |
| Unnumbered | June 21–23 | Tropical depression | 30 (45) | 1014 | None | None | None | |
| Unnumbered | July 10–12 | Tropical depression | 35 (55) | 1011 | None | None | None | |
| Amelia | July 30 – August 1 | Tropical storm | 50 (85) | 1005 | Texas | $110 million | 33 | |
| Bess | August 5–8 | Tropical storm | 50 (85) | 1005 | Mexico (Veracruz) | None | None | |
| Cora | August 7–12 | Category 1 hurricane | 90 (150) | 980 | Windward Islands (Grenada), Maine | Minimal | 1 | |
| Four | August 7–11 | Tropical depression | 35 (55) | 1008 | Windward Islands (Bequia), Central America (Nicaragua) | None | None | |
| Unnumbered | August 9–10 | Tropical depression | 30 (45) | 1015 | Louisiana | None | None | |
| Debra | August 26–29 | Tropical storm | 60 (95) | 1000 | Southern United States (Louisiana), Midwestern United States, Mid-Atlantic states, New England | Minor | 2 | |
| Ella | August 30 – September 5 | Category 4 hurricane | 140 (220) | 956 | East Coast of the United States, Atlantic Canada | None | None | |
| Unnumbered | August 30 – September 1 | Tropical depression | 35 (55) | 1013 | None | None | None | |
| Eight | September 3–11 | Tropical depression | 35 (55) | 1009 | None | None | None | |
| Flossie | September 4–15 | Category 2 hurricane | 100 (155) | 976 | None | None | None | |
| Nine | September 8–10 | Tropical depression | 35 (55) | 1003 | Mexico (Tamaulipas) | None | None | |
| Greta | September 13–20 | Category 4 hurricane | 135 (215) | 947 | Netherlands Antilles, Central America (Belize), Mexico | $25 million | 5 | |
| Hope | September 11–21 | Tropical storm | 65 (100) | 987 | None | None | None | |
| Twelve | September 18–29 | Tropical depression | 35 (55) | 1008 | None | None | None | |
| Unnumbered | September 21–23 | Tropical depression | 35 (55) | 1001 | Mexico (Veracruz) | None | None | |
| Irma | October 2–5 | Tropical storm | 50 (85) | 998 | Azores | None | None | |
| Juliet | October 7–11 | Tropical storm | 50 (85) | 1006 | Puerto Rico, Bermuda | None | None | |
| Unnumbered | October 13–17 | Tropical depression | 35 (55) | 992 | None | None | None | |
| Unnumbered | October 26–29 | Tropical depression | 30 (45) | 1008 | None | None | None | |
| Kendra | October 28 – November 1 | Category 1 hurricane | 80 (130) | 990 | Puerto Rico, East Coast of the United States | $6 million | 1 | |
| Unnumbered | November 3–5 | Tropical depression | 35 (55) | 1006 | None | None | None | |
Season aggregates
| 24 systems | January 18 – November 5 | | 140 (220) | 947 | | $141 million | 42 | |

== See also ==
- Tropical cyclones in 1978
- 1978 Pacific hurricane season
- 1978 Pacific typhoon season
- 1978 North Indian Ocean cyclone season
- Australian region cyclone seasons: 1977–78, 1978–79
- South Pacific cyclone seasons: 1977–78, 1978–79
- South-West Indian Ocean cyclone seasons: 1977–78, 1978–79
- South Atlantic tropical cyclone
- Mediterranean tropical-like cyclone
