= Freshwater Bayou, Louisiana =

Lake in Louisiana, United States

Coordinates: 29°36′29″N 92°20′03″W

Freshwater Bayou is a lake in Vermilion Parish, Louisiana.
