= 1956 Atlantic hurricane season =

- Season summary map

Seasonal boundaries
- First system formed: June 7, 1956
- Last system dissipated: November 21, 1956

Strongest storm
- Name: Betsy
  - Maximum winds: 120 mph (195 km/h) (1-minute sustained)
  - Lowest pressure: 954 mbar (hPa; 28.17 inHg)

Seasonal statistics
- Total depressions: 12
- Total storms: 12
- Hurricanes: 4
- Major hurricanes (Cat. 3+): 1
- Total fatalities: 76 overall
- Total damage: $67.8 million (1956 USD)

Related articles
- 1956 Pacific hurricane season; 1956 Pacific typhoon season; 1950s North Indian Ocean cyclone seasons

The 1956 Atlantic hurricane season featured a decent number of tropical cyclones, although most tropical storms and hurricanes affected land. There were twelve tropical storms, a third of which became hurricanes. One of the hurricanes strengthened to the equivalent of a major hurricane, which is a Category 3 or greater on the Saffir–Simpson scale. The strongest hurricane of the season was Betsy, which was also the most damaging storm of the season: it destroyed 15,000 houses and left $40 million in damage in Puerto Rico. (Note: All damage figures in the article are in 1956 United States dollars (USD).) Betsy was also the deadliest of the season, having killed 18 people in the French West Indies, two from a shipwreck in the Caribbean Sea, and 16 in Puerto Rico. Tropical Storm Dora struck Mexico in September and killed 27 people.

The season officially started on June 15, although an unnamed storm developed about a week prior over the western North Atlantic Ocean. A later storm that formed over the Gulf of Mexico on June 12 alleviated drought conditions in the south-central United States. Hurricane Anna developed in late July and hit Mexico. Tropical storms Carla and Ethel both formed near the Bahamas and moved northeastward until dissipating. The only hurricane that hit the contiguous United States was Hurricane Flossy. One of the final storms of the year, Greta, was an unusually large hurricane that produced high waves from Florida to the Lesser Antilles. It developed in the western Caribbean and moved across much of the southeastern United States, causing $24.8 million in damage and 15 deaths.

== Season summary ==
The season officially began on June 15, the date that the Weather Bureau office in Miami, Florida, under the direction of Gordon Dunn, began daily monitoring of all tropical disturbances and cyclones across the northern Atlantic Ocean. The agency had access to the hurricane hunters, a fleet of aircraft that obtain data by flying into storms. The Weather Bureau, in collaboration with other agencies, began a five–year project in 1956 to obtain and analyze data on the structure of hurricanes. The season officially ended on November 15.

There were a total of twelve tropical storms during the season, five of which were unnamed. In all, four storms strengthened into hurricanes. Compared to the average activity from the previous two decades, the season's activity was below normal despite average sea surface temperatures and a normal number of tropical waves. (Note: A tropical wave is an elongated low-pressure area that originates in Africa and moves westward across the Atlantic Ocean. Some tropical waves develop into tropical storms or hurricanes.) Instead, the inactivity was the result of the subtropical ridge being located further south than normal, which decreased the atmospheric instability across much of the basin. Such a pattern was different from the more active 1954 and 1955 seasons. Several tropical depressions formed that did not attain tropical storm status, many of which formed beneath an unfavorable upper-level trough.

The season's activity was reflected with a cumulative accumulated cyclone energy (ACE) rating of 54, which is categorized as being "below normal". ACE is, broadly speaking, a measure of the power of the hurricane multiplied by the length of time it existed, so storms that last a long time, as well as particularly strong hurricanes, have high ACEs. ACE is only calculated for full advisories on tropical systems at or exceeding 34 knots (39 mph; 63 km/h) or tropical storm strength. Thus, tropical depressions are excluded from the total.

== Systems ==
=== Early June tropical storm ===
- Tropical storm (SSHWS)
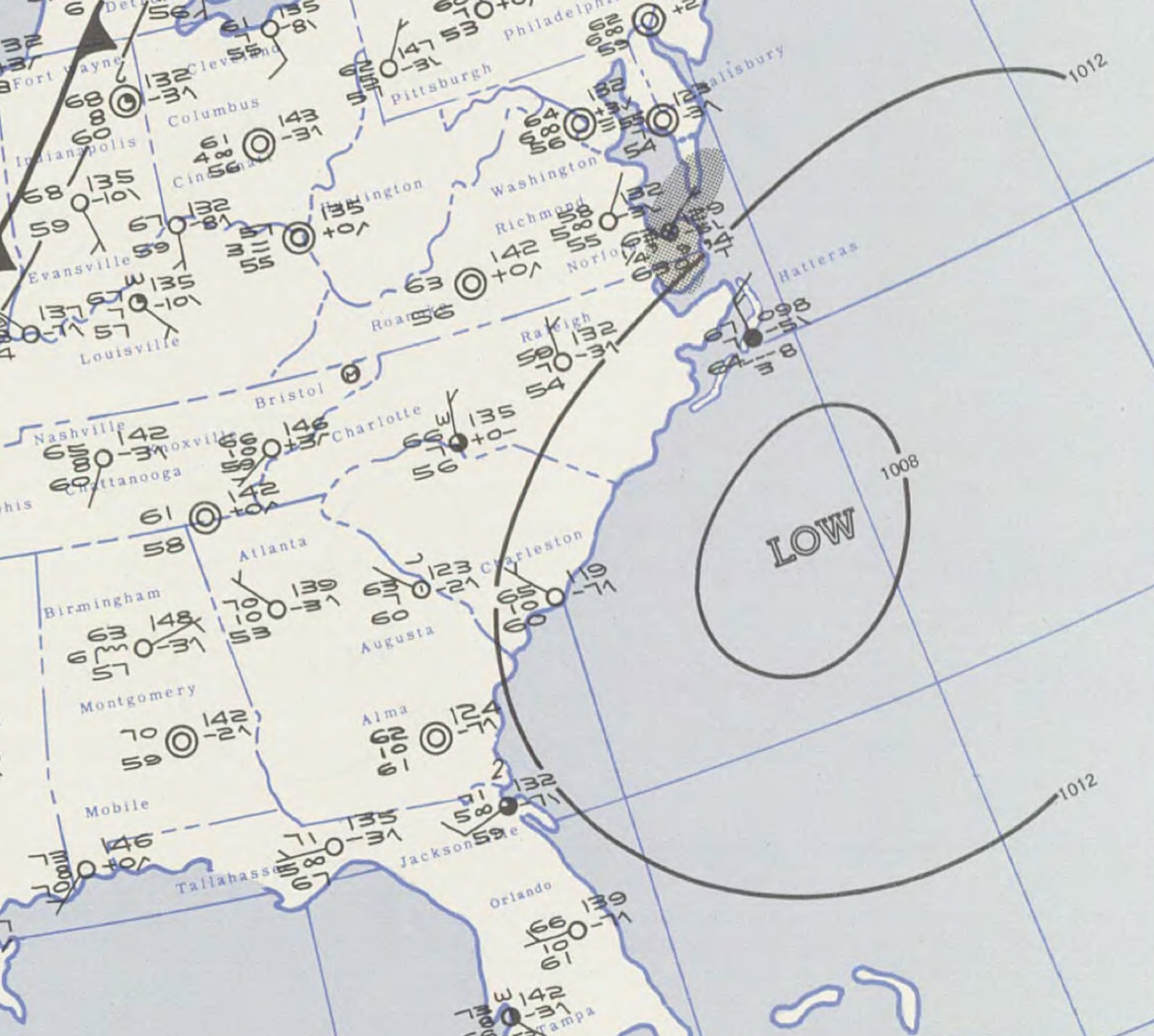
- Duration: June 7 – June 10
- Peak intensity: 45 mph (75 km/h) (1-min); ≤1001 mbar (hPa)

A dissipating cold front off the southeastern United States spawned a low-pressure area on June 6. On the next day, the system organized into a tropical storm off the coast of North Carolina. The storm moved southward and reached peak winds of 45 mph (70 km/h), based on reports from ships. During its duration, the storm failed to develop an inner core, affected by cool, dry air to the northwest. The structure was likely akin to a subtropical storm, based on its formation beneath an upper-level trough. On June 8, the storm accelerated to the northeast ahead of an approaching cold front, weakening to a tropical depression the next day, and becoming an extratropical cyclone within the front on June 10. The system dissipated later that day as a larger storm developed within the front.

=== Mid-June tropical storm ===
- Tropical storm (SSHWS)
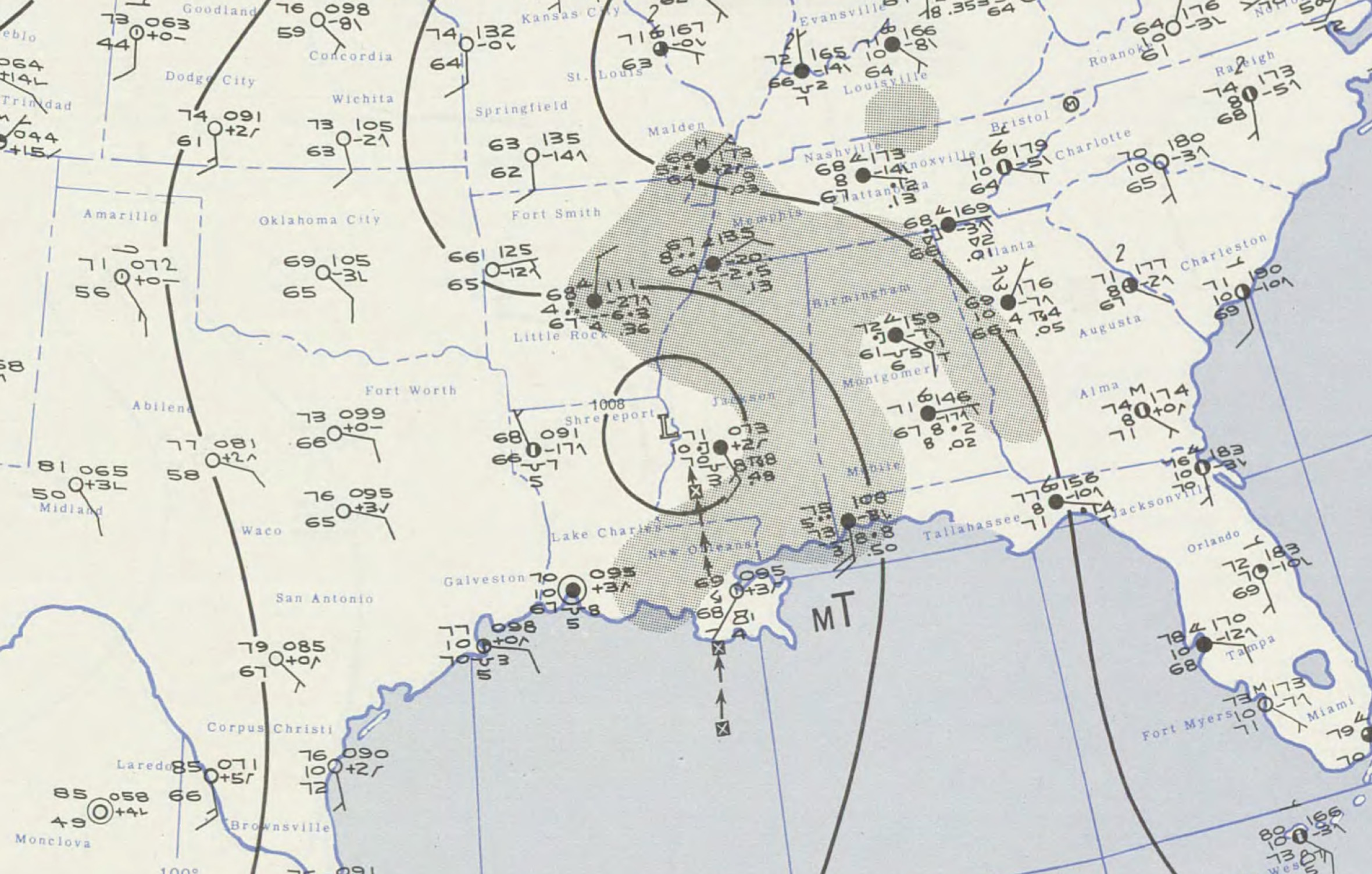
- Duration: June 12 – June 15
- Peak intensity: 60 mph (95 km/h) (1-min); 1001 mbar (hPa)

During the second week of June, a tropical wave traversing the Yucatán Peninsula commenced interacting with a trough extending from the Gulf of Mexico to the western Atlantic Ocean, which generated a disturbance over the Bay of Campeche, that spawned a tropical depression on June 12. The newly developed tropical cyclone tracked northward, quickly intensifying into a tropical storm. It attained peak winds of 60 mph (95 km/h) on June 13, although it never developed a well-defined circulation. In addition, it had characteristics of both a tropical and extratropical cyclone, with cooler air aloft. Late on June 13, the storm made landfall near Cocodrie, Louisiana, and its lowest pressure of 1,001 millibars (29.56 inHg) was measured over land, suggesting it did not weaken substantially after landfall. After moving inland, it dissipated on June 15 over Arkansas.

As the storm moved ashore, it did not develop rainbands, unlike other tropical cyclones. The heaviest rainfall occurred in a 100 mi (160 km) region east of where it moved ashore. Precipitation fell across the entire United States gulf coast, and the highest rainfall total was 8.89 in (226 mm) in Golden Meadow, Louisiana. The rains were beneficial to farmers, due to drought conditions persisting in the region. The storm produced higher than normal tides, peaking at 4.7 ft (1.4 m) in Biloxi, Mississippi; this was the highest since the 1947 Fort Lauderdale hurricane. The tides left damage to the Freeport Sulphur Company, as well as to boats, beaches, and piers. Three people died after their boat capsized, and there was another death after a driver skidded off the Lake Pontchartrain Causeway. A barge in the lake became disabled due to the storm and caused light damage to the causeway. Sustained winds during the storm's passage peaked at 55 mph (89 km/h) near Grand Isle, Louisiana, and a boat reported a gust of 60 mph (97 km/h) near Pilottown, Louisiana. Damage was estimated at $50,000.

=== Hurricane Anna ===
- Category 1 hurricane (SSHWS)
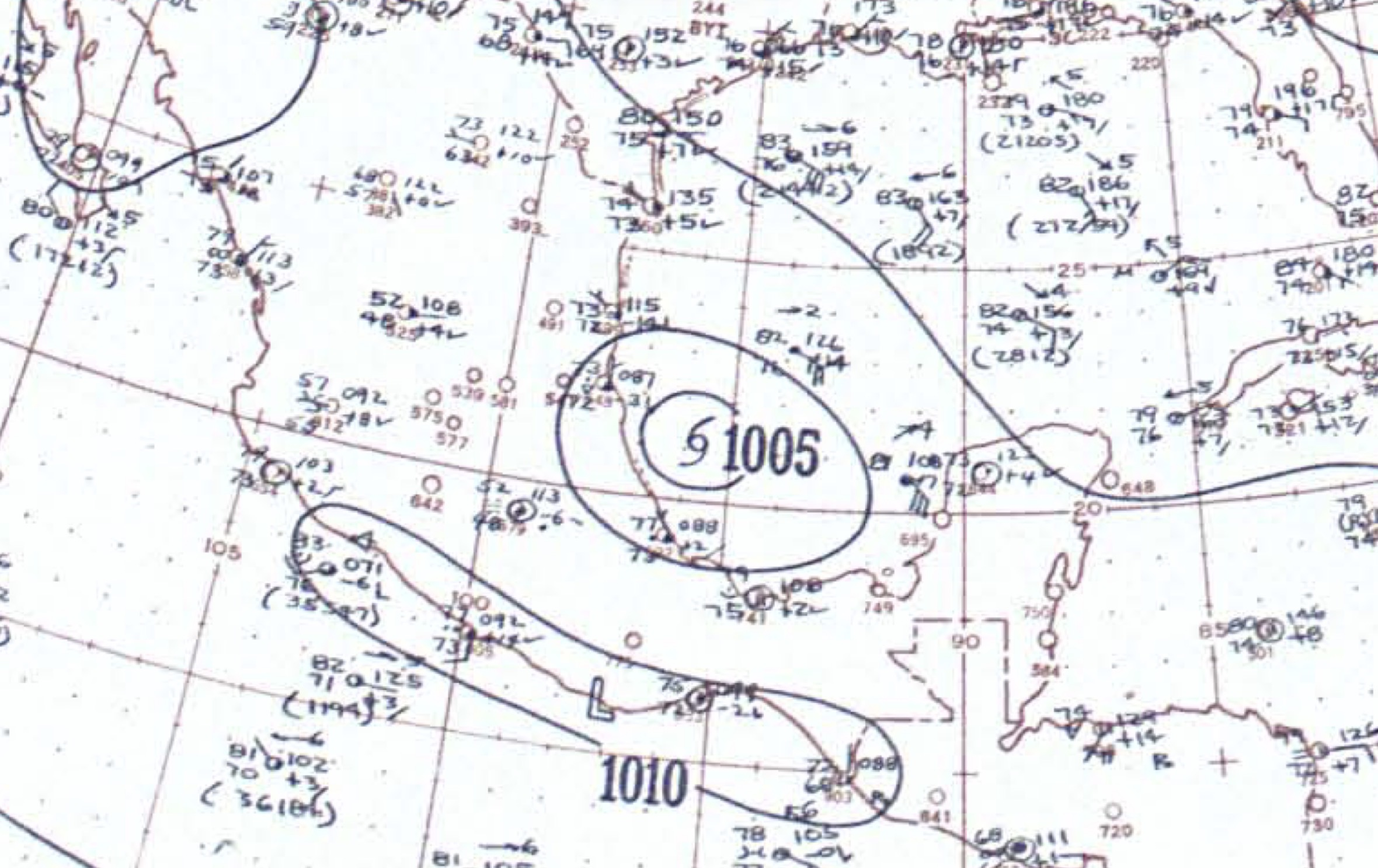
- Duration: July 25 – July 27
- Peak intensity: 85 mph (140 km/h) (1-min); ≤991 mbar (hPa)

A westward-moving tropical wave traversed the Lesser Antilles on July 20. It moved across the Caribbean, and its thunderstorms increased on July 23 while passing south of Cuba and beneath a high-pressure area. There is evidence that it could have developed a circulation on July 24 before it struck the Yucatán Peninsula. It is confirmed to have developed into a tropical depression on July 25 in the Bay of Campeche. As it continued west-northwestward, it rapidly intensified into Tropical Storm Anna, and before moving ashore in Mexico near Ozuluama, Veracruz, on July 26 it attained hurricane status. Peak winds reached 85 mph (135 km/h), although Anna rapidly dissipated on July 27 as it moved further inland. The high winds wrecked several homes in poor regions of Tampico, Tamaulipas, while rainfall of 2.5 in (64 mm) resulted in flooding. The high winds severed telegraph lines from Tampico to San Luis Potosí. The same area was affected by several hurricanes in the previous year. Damage totaled around $50,000, and there were no deaths.

=== Hurricane Betsy ===
- Category 3 hurricane (SSHWS)
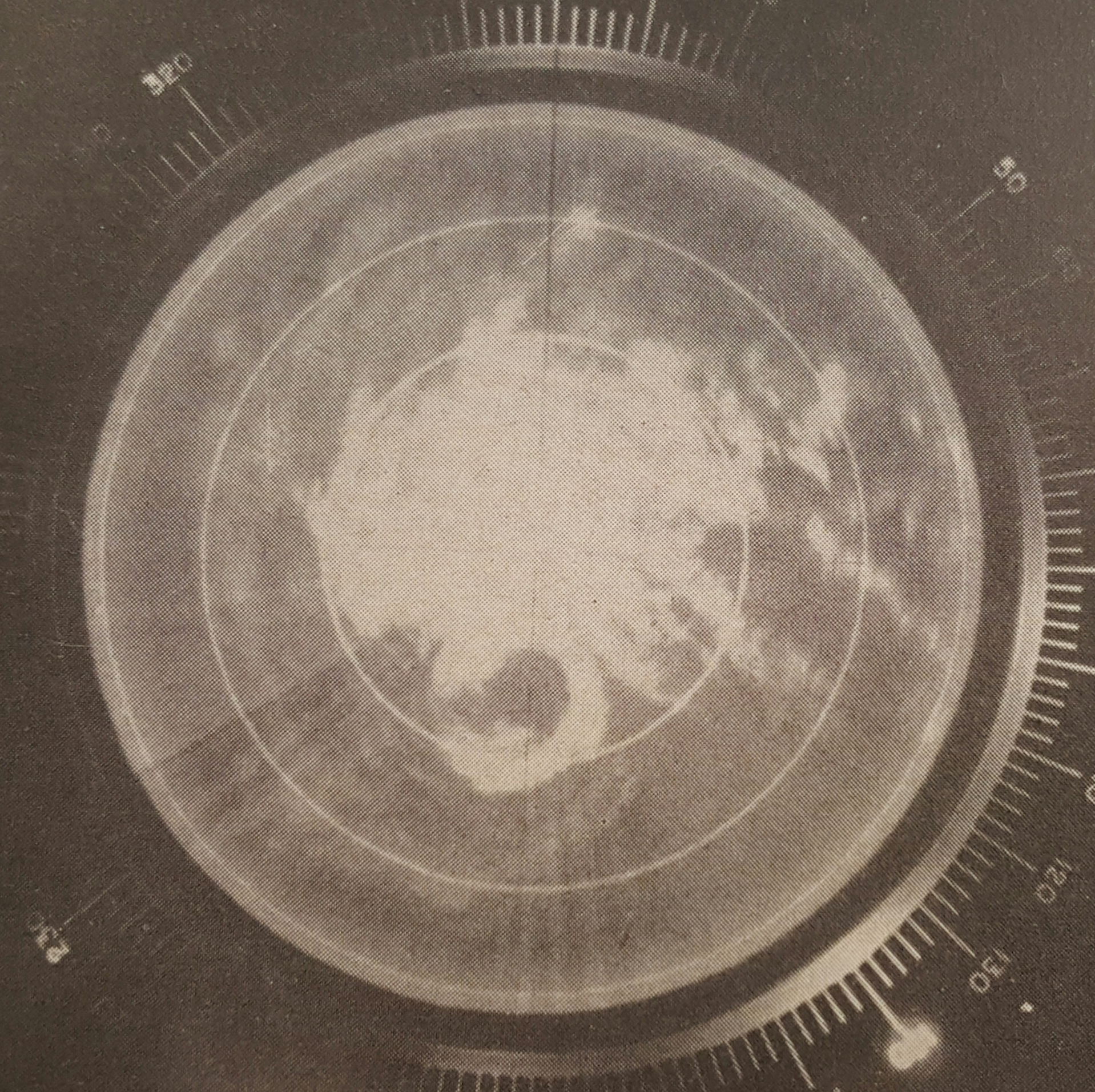
- Duration: August 9 – August 21 (extratropical after August 18)
- Peak intensity: 120 mph (195 km/h) (1-min); 954 mbar (hPa)

A tropical wave moved off the coast of Africa on August 4. It developed into Tropical Storm Betsy developed on August 9 to the east of the Lesser Antilles. It rapidly developed into a 105 mph (170 km/h) hurricane before striking Guadeloupe with a minimum central pressure of 979 mb (28.91 inHg). There, Betsy heavily damaged 1,000 houses and left severe crop destruction, and led to 18 deaths. As Betsy continued into the northeastern Caribbean, it capsized a ship, killing its crew of two. On August 12, a slightly weakened Betsy struck southeastern Puerto Rico near Maunabo with winds of 100 mph (160 km/h) and quickly crossed the island. Damage was heaviest where it moved ashore and in the territory's central portion. 15,023 houses were destroyed by Betsy, and multiple locations reported heavy crop damage, including Camuy, which reported a complete loss of the corn crop.

After exiting Puerto Rico, Betsy strengthened steadily as it headed generally northwestward, becoming a major hurricane on August 13 while centered north of the Turks and Caicos Islands. It attained peak winds of 120 mph (195 km/h) the next day to the east of the Bahamas. Betsy later turned northeastward, attaining its lowest central pressure of 954 mbar (28.17 inHg) on August 17. It later became extratropical early on August 18. The remnants dissipated two days later to the north of the Azores. Hurricane Betsy was the first hurricane to be observed from the San Juan radar, and also resulted in the first hurricane warning on the island that was released on television. The hurricane left $40 million in damage and 16 deaths, which prompted the declaration of a federal disaster area. Locally the hurricane was known as the Santa Clara Hurricane.

=== Tropical Storm Carla ===
- Tropical storm (SSHWS)
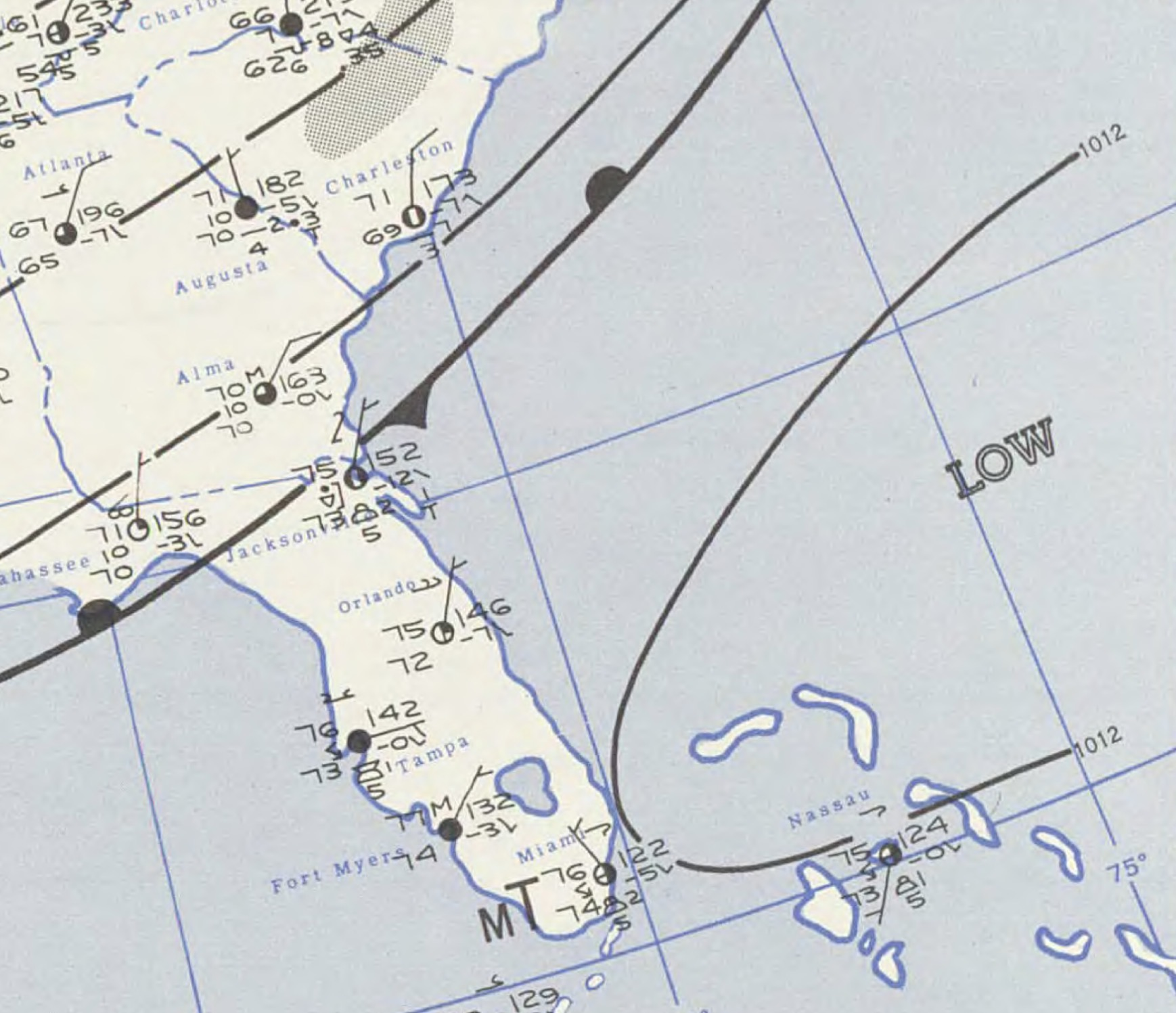
- Duration: September 7 – September 16 (extratropical after September 10)
- Peak intensity: 60 mph (95 km/h) (1-min); ≤996 mbar (hPa)

The origins of Tropical Storm Carla were from a tropical wave that spawned a depression near the Bahamas on September 7. It moved generally to the north, intensifying to a tropical storm the following day. An upper-level low located to the northeast of Carla produced hostile conditions that prevented significant strengthening, and Carla had a structure which resembled a subtropical storm. An approaching cold front turned the storm to the northeast, and despite the unfavorable atmosphere, Carla intensified, reaching peak winds of 60 mph (95 km/h) late on September 9. The interaction between the storm and a high-pressure system over the Great Lakes yielded a strong pressure gradient that produced gale-force winds over New England. After Carla passed to the north of Bermuda, it became extratropical on September 10, according to HURDAT—the official hurricane database—and the annual report in the Monthly Weather Review. As a post-tropical cyclone, ex-Carla strengthened to 70 mph (115 km/h) before weakening and dissipating by September 16.

=== Tropical Storm Dora ===
- Tropical storm (SSHWS)
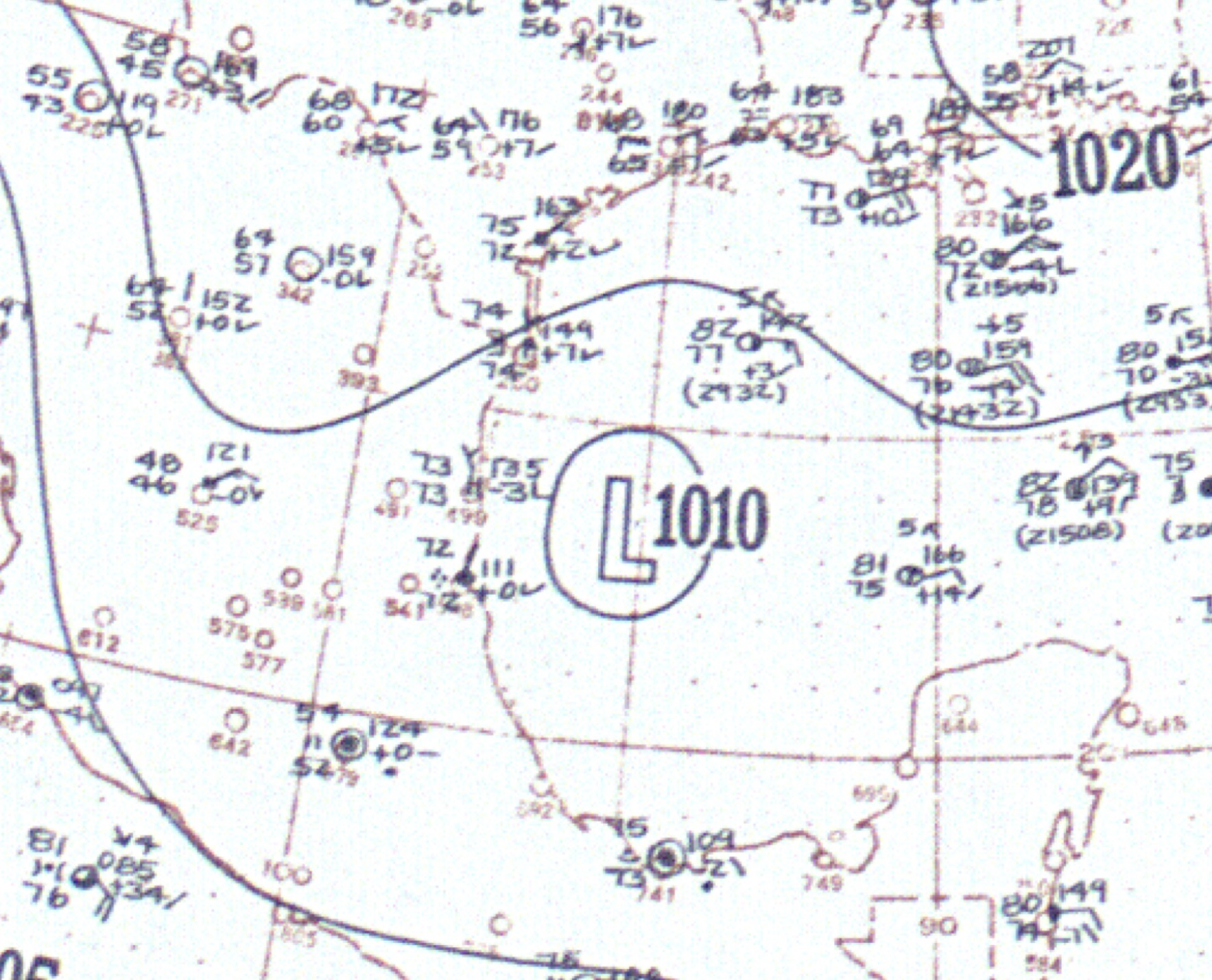
- Duration: September 10 – September 13
- Peak intensity: 60 mph (95 km/h) (1-min); 1000 mbar (hPa)

On September 10, a tropical depression developed over the Bay of Campeche. Later that day, hurricane hunters observed winds of tropical storm force, indicating that the depression had become Tropical Storm Dora, with winds of about 40 mph (65 km/h). Dora moved generally westward due to a ridge to its north. A reconnaissance flight on September 11 estimated hurricane-force winds, but reanalysis assessed these as being unrepresentative of Dora's true strength. Early on September 12, Dora peaked at 60 mph (95 km/h) shortly before striking land near Tuxpan with a minimum central pressure of 1,000 mb (29.53 inHg). It quickly dissipated early the next day, although the storm produced heavy rains across the region. The deluge caused a landslide as well as flooding, including along a river near San Andrés Tuxtla. In Puebla, there were 13 deaths and 20 injuries after a bus crashed into a washed out portion of the highway from Tuxpan to Mexico City. Overall, Dora caused 27 deaths in the country, but minor damage.

=== Tropical Storm Ethel ===
- Tropical storm (SSHWS)
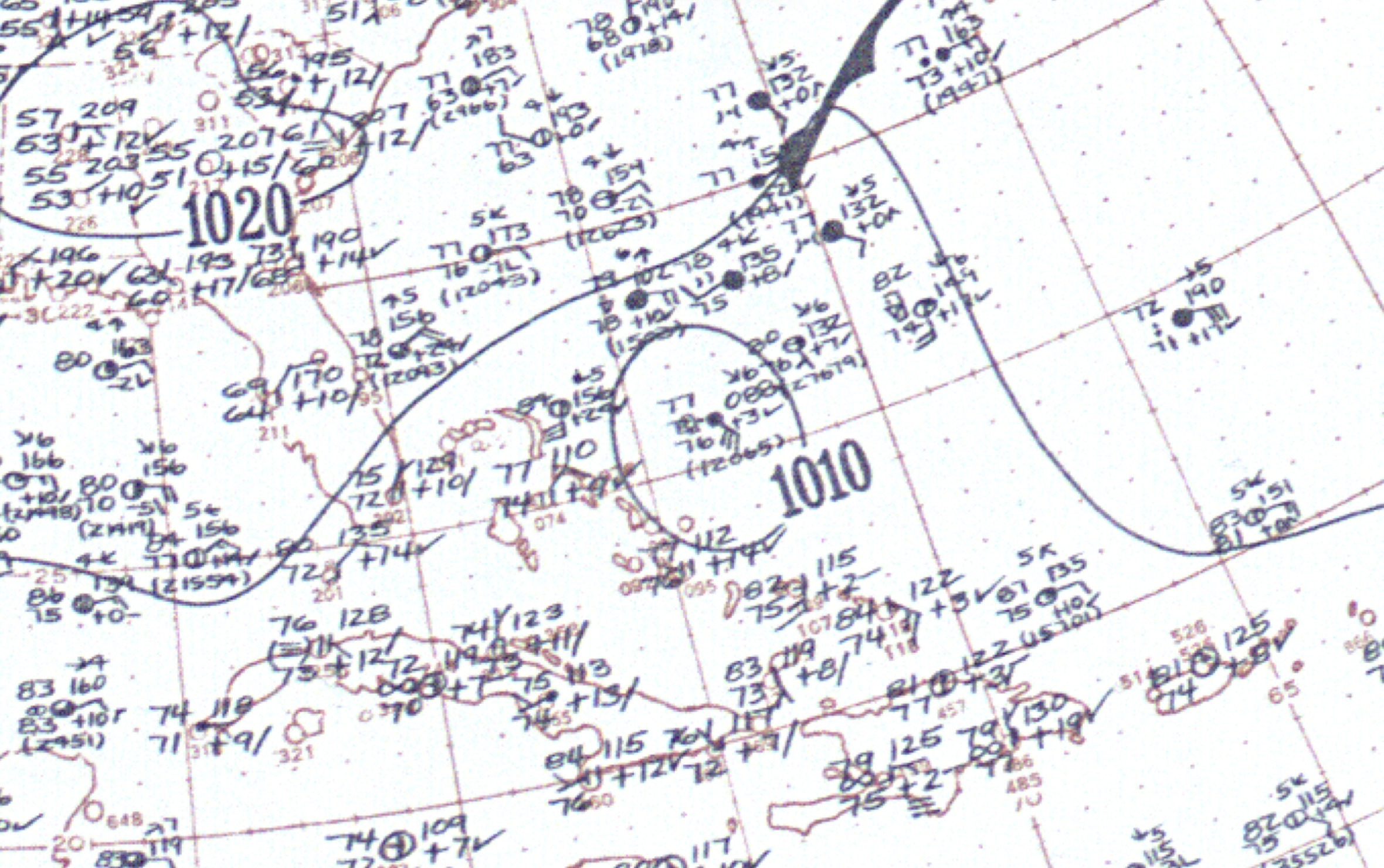
- Duration: September 11 – September 14
- Peak intensity: 60 mph (95 km/h) (1-min); 999 mbar (hPa)

On September 11, a tropical depression developed along the southern end of a quasi-stationary cold front over Grand Exuma Island in the Bahamas. It moved to the northeast and encountered cold air from the north. This resulted in significant instability that allowed in quick strengthening. A hurricane hunters flight on September 12 reported winds of 76 mph (122 km/h) in the storm's northeast quadrant; as a result, the depression was upgraded to Tropical Storm Ethel. The flight observed a well-developed eye 20 mi (32 km) in diameter, although they only observed hurricane-force winds in one quadrant. Reassessment, however, discounted the observations of hurricane-force winds from the aircraft as being unrepresentative of Ethel's strength, and analyzed that Ethel peaked at 60 mph (95 km/h) late on September 12, with the lowest pressure reported being 999 mbar (29.50 inHg). Shortly after reaching peak intensity, Ethel began weakening and dissipated on September 14 to the southwest of Bermuda.

=== Hurricane Flossy ===
- Category 1 hurricane (SSHWS)
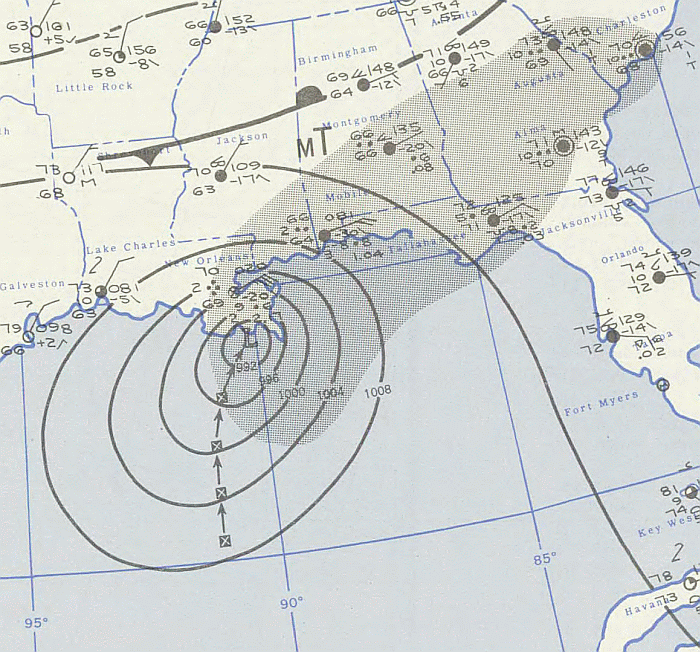
- Duration: September 20 – October 3 (extratropical after September 25)
- Peak intensity: 90 mph (150 km/h) (1-min); 974 mbar (hPa)

Hurricane Flossy originated from a tropical wave that moved through the Caribbean. A tropical depression formed on September 20 just east of the Yucatán Peninsula and headed northwest across the landmass. Upon entering the Gulf of Mexico on September 22, it quickly intensified into Tropical Storm Flossy. Continuing to intensify, the storm turned to the north and attained hurricane status on September 23. Bearing winds of 85 mph (135 km/h), Flossy struck near Venice, Louisiana, on September 24 after turning to the northeast, crossing the Mississippi River Delta. The hurricane again moved into the Gulf of Mexico, continuing to the northeast and intensifying further until moving ashore near Miramar Beach, Florida, on September 25 as a strong Category 1 hurricane with winds of 90 mph (145 km/h) and a minimum pressure of 974 mbar (28.76 inHg). Later that day, Flossy became extratropical over Georgia after weakening into a tropical storm. The extratropical remnants moved through the southeast United States and emerged from North Carolina into the western Atlantic on September 27. The storm was last observed on October 3, near southernmost Newfoundland.

Flossy was the only hurricane of the season to strike the United States. Winds in Louisiana reached 84 mph (135 km/h), although an oil rig offshore Grand Isle reported a gust of 95 mph (153 km/h). The storm dropped heavy rainfall along its path, peaking at 16.7 in (420 mm) in Golden Meadow, Louisiana. The rainfall and the hurricane's accompanying storm surge caused widespread flooding and beach erosion in southeast Louisiana. The flooding surmounted the eastern seawall in New Orleans, submerging an area of 2.5 sq mi (6.5 km^{2}). Across the region, the resulting flooding drowned cattle and caused heavy crop damage. Hurricane Flossy left about $27.8 million in damage (1956 USD), mostly from crop damage, as well as 15 deaths. The rainfall extended through the Mid-Atlantic states, which alleviated drought conditions.

=== Early October tropical storm ===
- Tropical storm (SSHWS)
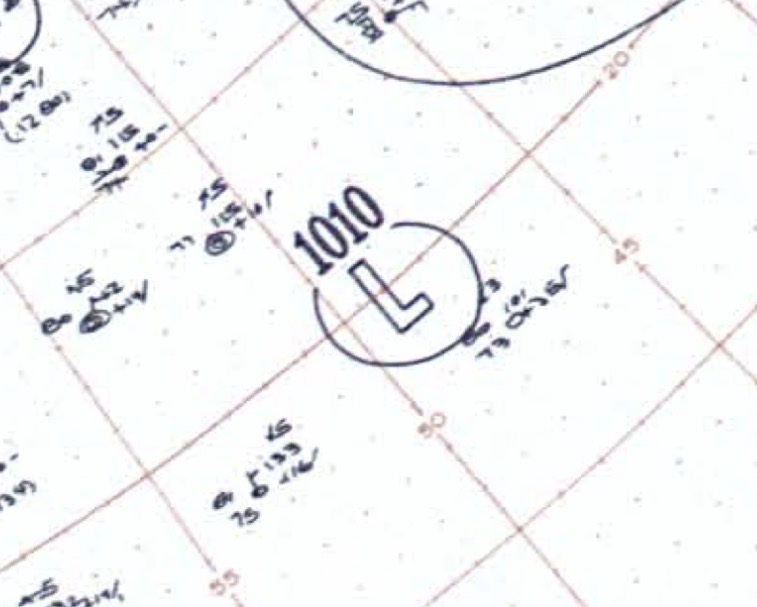
- Duration: October 9 – October 12
- Peak intensity: 45 mph (75 km/h) (1-min); ≤1004 mbar (hPa)

A tropical wave exited the west coast of Africa in early October. By October 9, a tropical storm developed with winds of 45 mph (70 km/h), based on ship reports. On October 10, the storm turned to the north and weakened to a tropical depression. It drifted northeast for two days, dissipating on October 12.

=== Mid-October tropical storm ===
- Tropical storm (SSHWS)
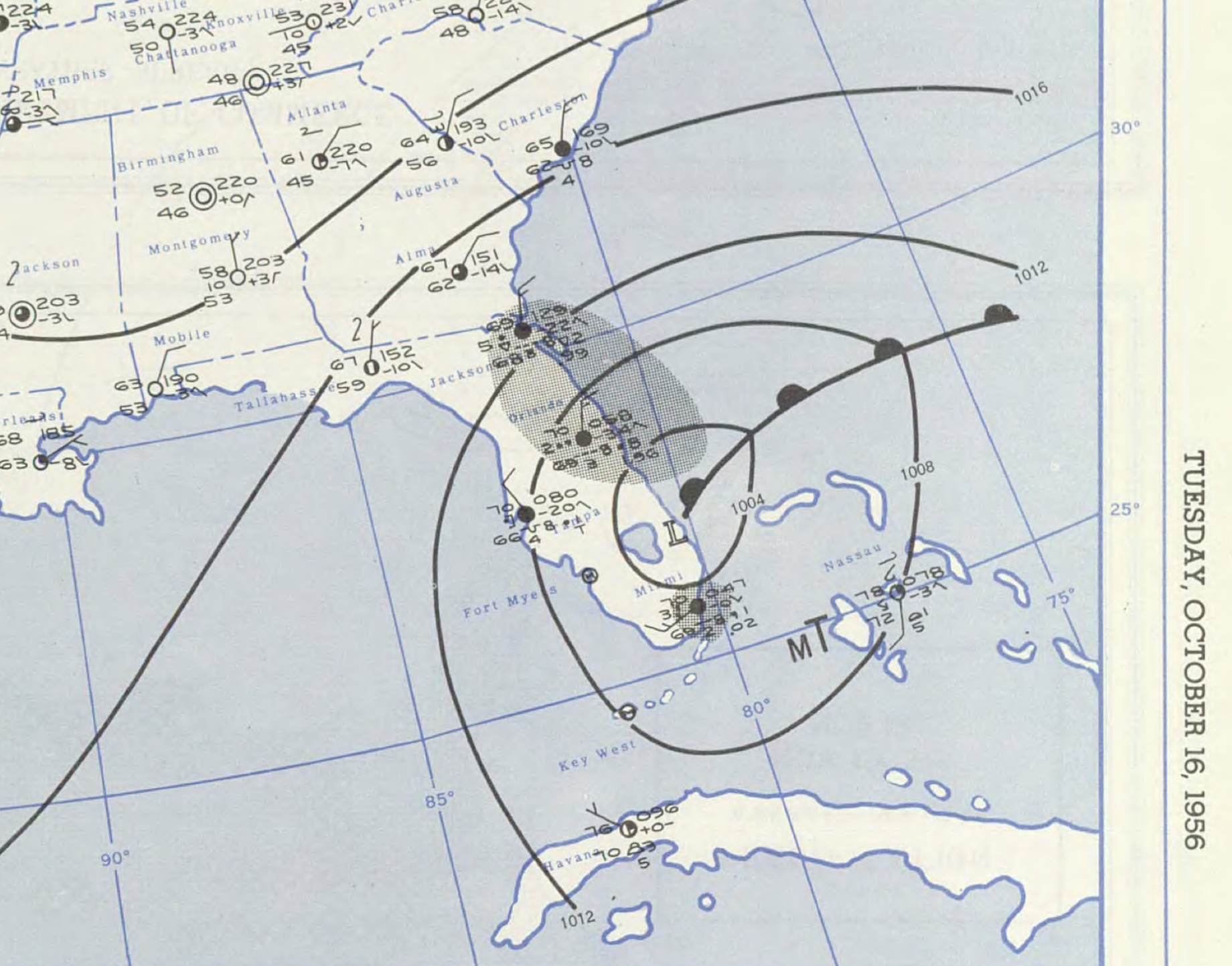
- Duration: October 14 – October 19 (extratropical after October 17)
- Peak intensity: 65 mph (100 km/h) (1-min); 996 mbar (hPa)

A low-pressure area formed along a dissipating cold front to the north of Puerto Rico. The system moved westward, developing some tropical characteristics by October 13. The next day, the system became a tropical storm over the Straits of Florida. On October 15, it crossed over South Florida near Homestead with winds of 60 mph (95 km/h). While it is unclear whether this cyclone ever became fully tropical, it is entered into HURDAT as a tropical cyclone. The storm intensified further over the Florida peninsula, peaking at 65 mph (105 km/h) early on October 16. After affecting Florida, the storm crossed the western Atlantic and moved across the Outer Banks. The storm became extratropical on October 17, and the next day it was absorbed by another extratropical storm.

The storm produced significant rainfall in a 50 mi (80 km) region of Florida. The highest total in the state was 16.28 in (414 mm) in Kissimmee. There, the rains caused flash flooding that entered over 200 houses. The flooding flooded three state highways, and also left portions of Okeechobee inaccessible after reporting the heaviest rainfall in eight years. Large tomato fields were inundated, resulting in some crop damage. In portions of the state, the rains were beneficial due to previously dry conditions. The storm spawned a tornado in North Miami that injured one person. Damage throughout Florida was estimated at $3 million, mostly in the Kissimmee area. In addition, two surfers drowned during the storm. Precipitation extended as far north as New Jersey, and coastal areas experienced high tides and gusty winds.

=== Hurricane Greta ===
- Category 2 hurricane (SSHWS)
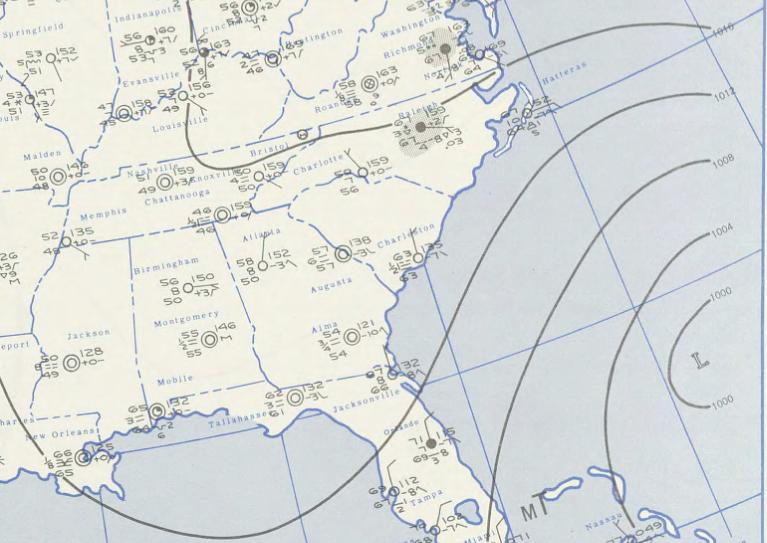
- Duration: October 31 – November 7 (extratropical after November 6)
- Peak intensity: 100 mph (155 km/h) (1-min); 970 mbar (hPa)

The Intertropical Convergence Zone spawned a tropical depression on October 31 a short distance to south of easternmost Cuba. The system tracked northward and crossed over eastern Cuba, and the system initially had characteristics of an extratropical cyclone. It eventually acquired tropical features and intensified into Tropical Storm Greta on November 1. A high-pressure area east of the Mid-Atlantic states caused the depression to turn to the south on November 2 and loop to the southeast. Later that day the depression intensified into Tropical Storm Greta to the northeast of the Bahamas. It attained hurricane status on November 4 while maintaining a large size (in fact, becoming one of the largest tropical cyclones known in the Atlantic basin); such strengthening is unusual in storms moving in a southeast trajectory. Greta turned to the east and later northeast, reaching its peak of 100 mph (160 km/h) late on November 4 due to the energy transfer between levels of the atmosphere. Cooler waters caused subsequent weakening and gradual loss of tropical characteristics, and Greta transitioned into an extratropical storm on November 6, dissipating the next day.

The extremely large size of Greta, in conjunction with the high-pressure system to its north, produced strong winds and high waves across a large area of the western Atlantic. In Puerto Rico, waves of 20 ft (6.1 m) left heavy damage and killed one person who did not heed an evacuation order. Waves reached 25 ft (7.6 m) in the French West Indies, which destroyed 80% of the structures at the port in Basse-Terre, Guadeloupe. Further west, high waves left heavy damage in and around the beaches of Jacksonville, Florida. Overall damage was estimated at $3.58 million.

=== November tropical storm ===
- Tropical storm (SSHWS)
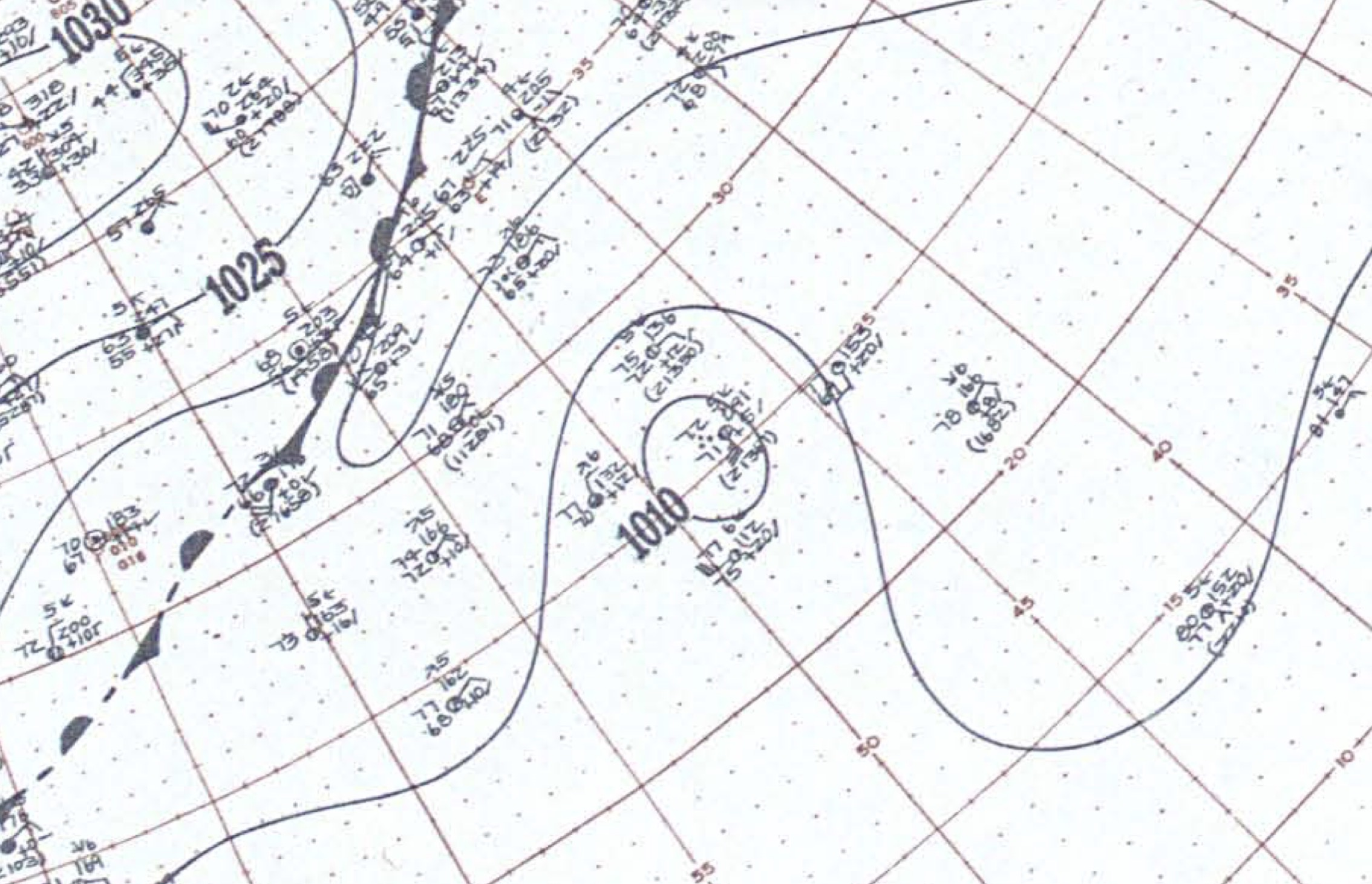
- Duration: November 19 – November 21
- Peak intensity: 45 mph (75 km/h) (1-min); ≤1002 mbar (hPa)

In the middle of November, a weakening cold front produced a low-pressure area, which organized into a tropical depression early on November 19, though it is possible it formed a day earlier. The depression moved slowly west for the next 12 hours, becoming a tropical storm thereafter. Due to its slow movement, and based on ship reports, it is estimated that peak winds were 45 mph (70 km/h), with a minimum pressure recorded was 1002 mbar. The system continued to crawl westward, weakening to a depression on November 21 at 12:00 UTC and degenerating later in the day to a trough of low pressure.

=== Other systems ===
A weak circulation developed late on July 4 beneath a cold mid-level trough in the Gulf of Mexico. It moved north-northwestward, and hit near Pensacola, Florida, on July 6. It dissipated on July 7. Although the disturbance did not generate gale force sustained winds, it produced wind gusts of 47 mph (76 km/h) in Panama City, Florida. As it moved ashore, the system dropped heavy amounts of precipitation, with a total of 14.22 in (361 mm) reported in Whatley, Alabama. The rains washed away or eroded several highways and bridges, and also resulted in some agricultural damage. A train line from Mobile to Birmingham, Alabama, was washed out near Suggsville. Overall the damage was estimated at $503,000, and there were no associated deaths.

A vigorous tropical wave spawned a possible tropical depression on August 28 near the Cape Verde islands. A weather station on the island of Sal recorded a minimum central pressure of 1,004 mbar (29.6 inHg) on August 31. Ships in the area reported winds as strong as 46 mph (74 km/h) as the storm moved through the islands. However, the ship and land data was insufficient to establish whether the system had developed a closed low level circulation. It maintained a general westward track, eventually dissipating on September 6 to the northeast of the Lesser Antilles.

== Storm names ==
The following list of names was used for named storms (tropical storms and hurricanes) that formed in the North Atlantic in 1956. This was a completely new set of names; thus, every name used this season was used for the first time. No names were retired this season.

- Anna
- Betsy
- Carla
- Dora
- Ethel
- Flossy
- Greta
- Hattie (unused)
- Inez (unused)
- Judith (unused)
- Kitty (unused)
- Laura (unused)
- Molly (unused)
- Nona (unused)
- Odette (unused)
- Paula (unused)
- Quenby (unused)
- Rhoda (unused)
- Sadie (unused)
- Terese (unused)
- Ursel (unused)
- Vesta (unused)
- Winny (unused)
- Xina (unused)
- Yola (unused)
- Zenda (unused)

== See also ==
- 1956 Pacific hurricane season
- 1956 Pacific typhoon season
- Australian region cyclone seasons: 1955–56 1956–57
- South Pacific cyclone seasons: 1955–56 1956–57
- South-West Indian Ocean cyclone seasons: 1955–56 1956–57
