= List of storms named Greta =

The name Greta has been used for four tropical cyclones in the Atlantic Ocean:

- Hurricane Greta (1956) – Category 2 hurricane, did not directly impact land.
- Tropical Storm Greta (1966) – no impact on land.
- Tropical Storm Greta (1970) – traversed the northern Yucatán Peninsula and later made landfall near Tampico, Mexico.
- Hurricane Greta (1978) – Category 4 Hurricane, made landfall near Dangriga, Belize, crossed Guatemala and southeastern Mexico as a tropical depression, then re-intensified in the Eastern Pacific and was renamed Olivia.
