= Hurricane Betsy (1956) =

Category 3 Atlantic hurricane in 1956

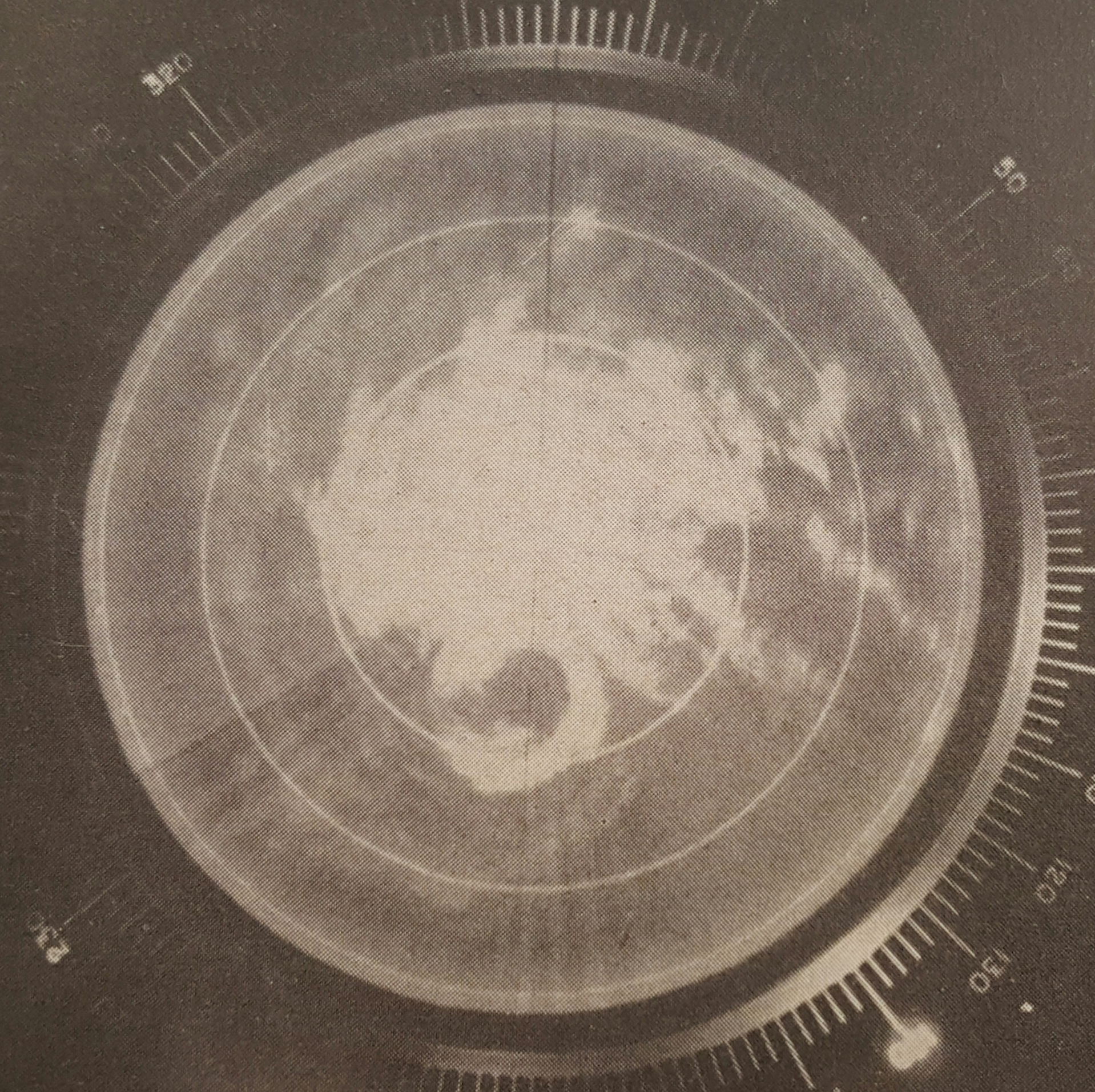
- Betsy near landfall in Puerto Rico

Meteorological history
- Formed: August 9, 1956
- Dissipated: August 18, 1956

Category 3 major hurricane
- 1-minute sustained (SSHWS/NWS)
- Highest winds: 120 mph (195 km/h)
- Lowest pressure: 954 mbar (hPa); 28.17 inHg

Overall effects
- Fatalities: 37
- Damage: $50 million (1956 USD)
- Areas affected: Lesser Antilles, U.S. Virgin Islands, Puerto Rico, Hispaniola, Bahamas, East Coast of the United States
- IBTrACS
- Part of the 1956 Atlantic hurricane season

Hurricane Betsy, known as Hurricane Santa Clara in Puerto Rico, was the first North Atlantic hurricane to make landfall in Puerto Rico in 24 years. The third tropical cyclone of the 1956 Atlantic hurricane season, Betsy developed from a tropical wave on August 9 to the east of the Lesser Antilles. It rapidly developed into a 120 mph (190 km/h) major hurricane before striking Guadeloupe. There, Betsy heavily damaged 1000 houses and left severe crop destruction, and there were 18 deaths in the territory. As Betsy continued into the northeastern Caribbean, it capsized a ship, killing its crew of two.

On August 12, Betsy struck southeastern Puerto Rico and quickly crossed the island. Damage was heaviest where it moved ashore and in the territory's central portion, and throughout Puerto Rico there were 15,023 houses that were destroyed by Betsy. Multiple locations reported heavy crop damage, including Camuy which reported a complete loss of the corn crop. Hurricane Betsy was the first hurricane to be observed from the San Juan radar, and also resulted in the first hurricane warning on the island to be released on television. The hurricane left $40 million in damage and 16 deaths, which prompted a federally declared disaster area. Locally the hurricane was known as the Santa Clara Hurricane. After exiting Puerto Rico, Betsy brushed the Bahamas before turning northeastward, becoming extratropical on August 18. The remnants dissipated two days later to the south of Newfoundland.

== Meteorological history ==
Map plotting the storm's track and intensity, according to the Saffir–Simpson scale Map key Saffir–Simpson scale Tropical depression (≤38 mph, ≤62 km/h) Tropical storm (39–73 mph, 63–118 km/h) Category 1 (74–95 mph, 119–153 km/h) Category 2 (96–110 mph, 154–177 km/h) Category 3 (111–129 mph, 178–208 km/h) Category 4 (130–156 mph, 209–251 km/h) Category 5 (≥157 mph, ≥252 km/h) Unknown Storm type Tropical cyclone Subtropical cyclone Extratropical cyclone, remnant low, tropical disturbance, or monsoon depression

Before Betsy's formation, the northeastward shift of the Azores High allowed for an increase in atmospheric instability across the tropical Atlantic, which made conditions for tropical cyclogenesis more favorable in early August. A tropical wave exited the west coast of Africa on August 4. On August 9, a ship reported rough seas and winds of force 10 on the Beaufort scale. On that basis, it is estimated that Tropical Storm Betsy developed that day about 835 mi (1,344 km) east of Barbados. The next day, a Hurricane Hunters flight observed winds of 120 mph (190 km/h), which indicated that Betsy had intensified significantly overnight. The flight reported how small the hurricane was, including a 10 mi (16 km) wide eye. After maintaining that intensity for about 24 hours, Betsy began weakening, moving directly over Marie-Galante and southern Guadeloupe. It entered the eastern Caribbean with winds of 90 mph (140 km/h) before it began a track to the west-northwest.

On August 12, Hurricane Betsy passed about 30 mi (48 km) south of Saint Croix before striking southeastern Puerto Rico. This made Betsy the first hurricane to strike the island since the 1932 San Ciprian hurricane. It crossed the central portion of the island, and the structure deteriorated and the eye became difficult to locate as Betsy crossed the highest mountains. On two occasions the eye dropped slightly to the south because of the mountains. The eye became well-defined as it approached the coast, and Betsy emerged on the northwest coast near Camuy at a similar intensity as when it moved ashore. The hurricane re-intensified as it moved toward the Bahamas, reaching winds of 110 mph (180 km/h) on August 13. That day, the eye passed near Grand Turk Island and San Salvador Island. By that time, the storm had increased in size; the Hurricane Hunters reported that the gale-force winds extended 125 mi (201 km) to its north. The eye reformed on August 14, becoming well-organized and attaining a minimum barometric pressure of 960 mbar (28 inHg). The next day, Betsy turned to the northeast due to an approaching trough. Despite beginning a weakening trend, the pressure dropped further to 954 mbar (28.2 inHg) on August 17. The eye became increasingly poorly defined, and Betsy weakened to a tropical storm on August 18 to the south of Nova Scotia. Turning to the east, it became extratropical later that day, eventually dissipating on August 20.

== Impact ==
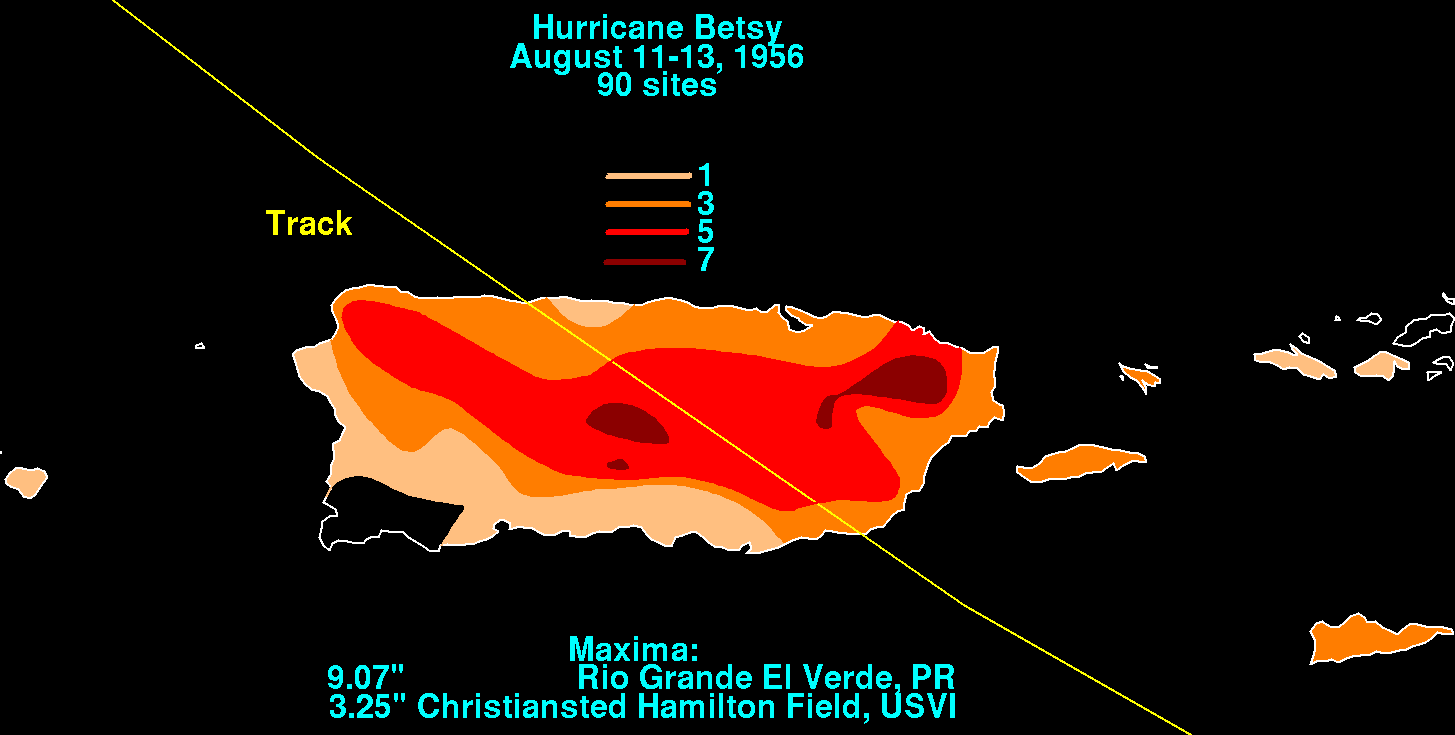
Rainfall summary of Hurricane Betsy in Puerto Rico

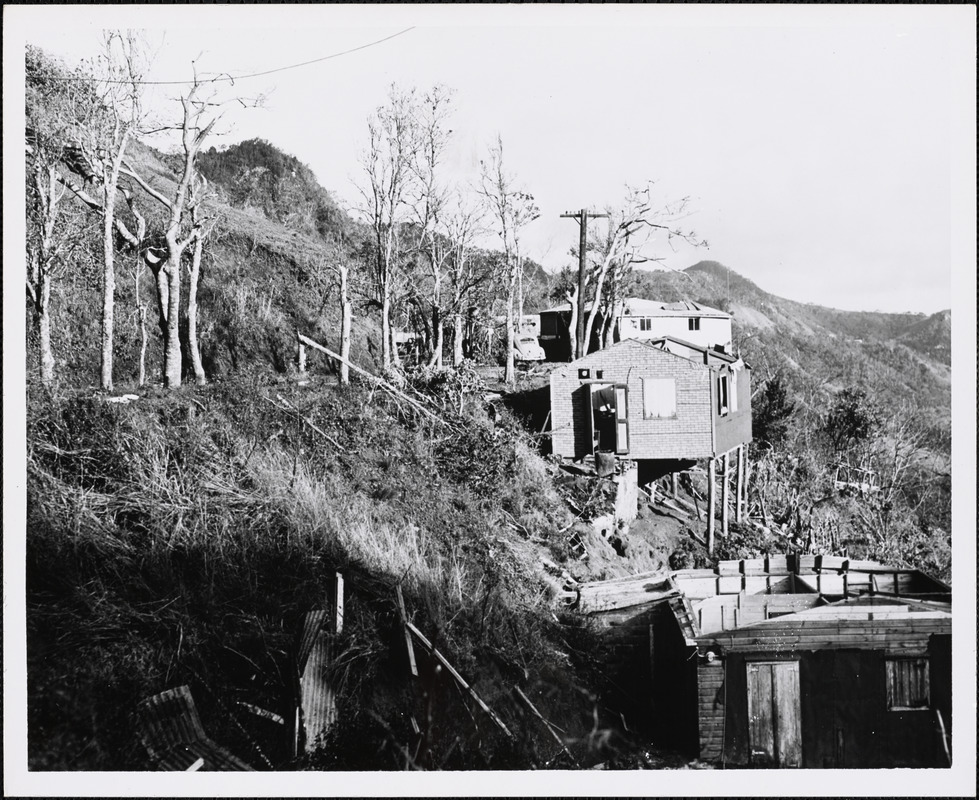
Damaged buildings

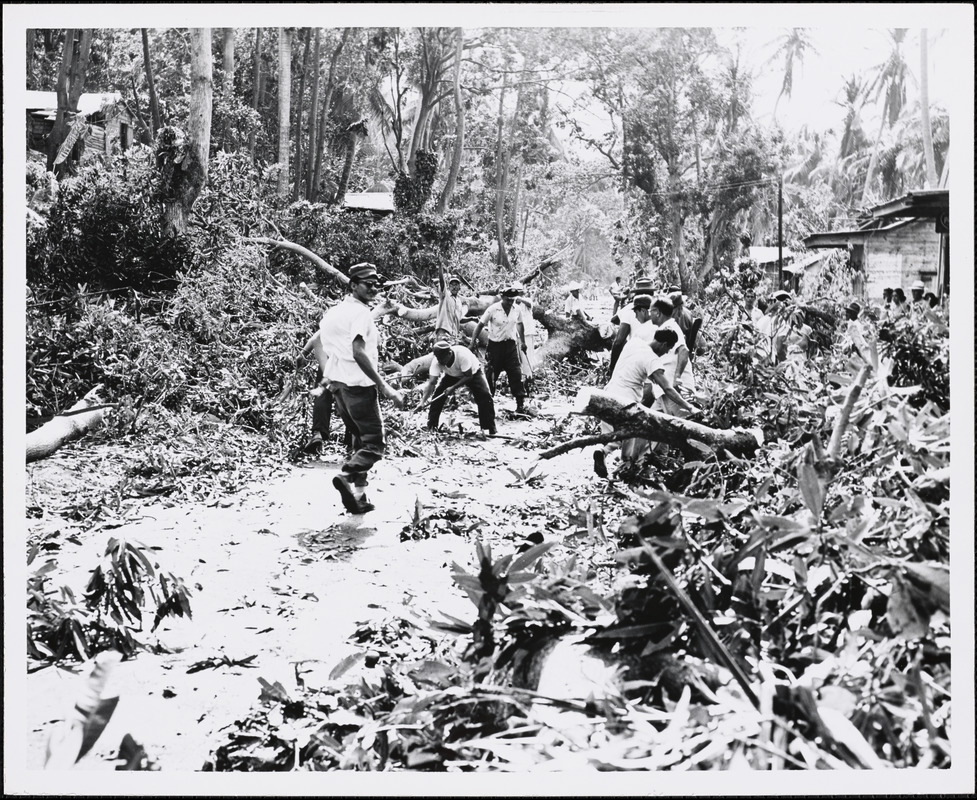
Removal of fallen trees

When the first advisory was issued on Betsy, a hurricane watch was issued from Barbados to Antigua. Around that time, a hurricane watch was also issued for Puerto Rico and the United States Virgin Islands, which was later upgraded to a hurricane warning. This was the first hurricane warning in Puerto Rico to be aired on television.

The hurricane struck Guadeloupe with winds from 100–120 mph (160–190 km/h), which caused extensive damage to 1,000 houses. The communications throughout the territory were disrupted. The high winds destroyed upwards of 60% of the banana, breadfruit, coconut, and papaya crop, which severely impacted the economy. Across the French West Indies, the hurricane resulted in 18 deaths and caused $10 million in damage, $3.5 million of which from crop damage. In nearby Dominica, winds reached 69 mph (111 km/h). In Saint Croix, the hurricane dropped 3.20 in (81 mm), while winds reached 86 mph (138 km/h). In the northeastern Caribbean, Betsy capsized a ship and killed its crew of two. Another ship in the region drifted for several days south of Saint Croix due to a damaged engine.

When Betsy crossed Puerto Rico, it produced hurricane-force winds across the entire territory except in the southwest corner. Sustained winds reached 73 mph (117 km/h) in San Juan, and Ramey Air Force Base on the island's northwestern portion recorded 115 mph (185 km/h) wind gusts. The high winds downed a significant number of trees in the island's interior due to the funneling within valleys. In Aibonito, the winds destroyed 1000 houses and damaged another 500, and in nearby Comerío the winds severely damaged or destroyed 1285 dwellings. In Jayuya in the central portion of the island, the hurricane left severe crop damage, including a complete loss to the banana crop. However, damage was heaviest in Yabucoa near where Betsy moved ashore, due to a slight oscillation of the eye. High winds caused severe damage in a 20 mi (32 km) radius. In Yabucoa, over 12,000 people were left homeless, and damage totaled $8 million. Damage was likewise severe where Betsy moved offshore in Camuy, with a complete loss to the corn crop, 95% of the avocado, 65% of breadfruit, and 50% of the coffee crop ruined. The hurricane dropped heavy rainfall in the central portion of the island, with a peak 24‑hour total of 8.72 in (221 mm) in Río Grande. The same station recorded a total of 9.07 in (230 mm), which was the highest total related to Betsy's passage. Across Puerto Rico, Betsy destroyed 15,023 houses and left $40 million in damage. There were sixteen deaths on the island, which was less than expected due to well-heeded warnings. There were also 24 injuries in the territory related to the storm. Betsy was the first hurricane on record to be observed from the San Juan radar. On the island, it is known as the Santa Clara hurricane. Due to the damage, U.S. President Dwight Eisenhower declared Puerto Rico as a disaster area on August 18, which allocated millions of dollars in assistance. The Puerto Rican governor allocated $6.7 million of funding to aid in rebuilding.

In San Salvador in the Bahamas, the hurricane produced wind gusts of 132 mph (212 km/h), and sustained winds reached 100 mph (160 km/h). The storm dropped about 5 in (130 mm) of rainfall. Betsy destroyed several houses and wrecked the roofs of several churches. Hurricane Betsy left about $380,000 in damage in the Bahamas. While delivering relief supplies to San Salvador Air Force Base, a Douglas C-124A-DL Globemaster II operated by the U.S. Air Force crashed. The plane had a right landing gear fail and as the result the plane skidded down the runway and came to a stop. One person was killed. Due to uncertainty in the storm's movement, officials issued a hurricane warning for southern Florida. Although Betsy remained far away from the state, its eye was observed on radar in Miami at a potentially record distance of 337 mi (542 km).

In the Grand Banks offshore Canada, the hurricane sunk a ship, although the entire crew was rescued.

== See also ==
- List of Atlantic hurricanes
- Atlantic hurricane season
- 1956 Atlantic hurricane season
