= Hurricane Greta–Olivia =

Category 4 Atlantic and Pacific hurricane in 1978

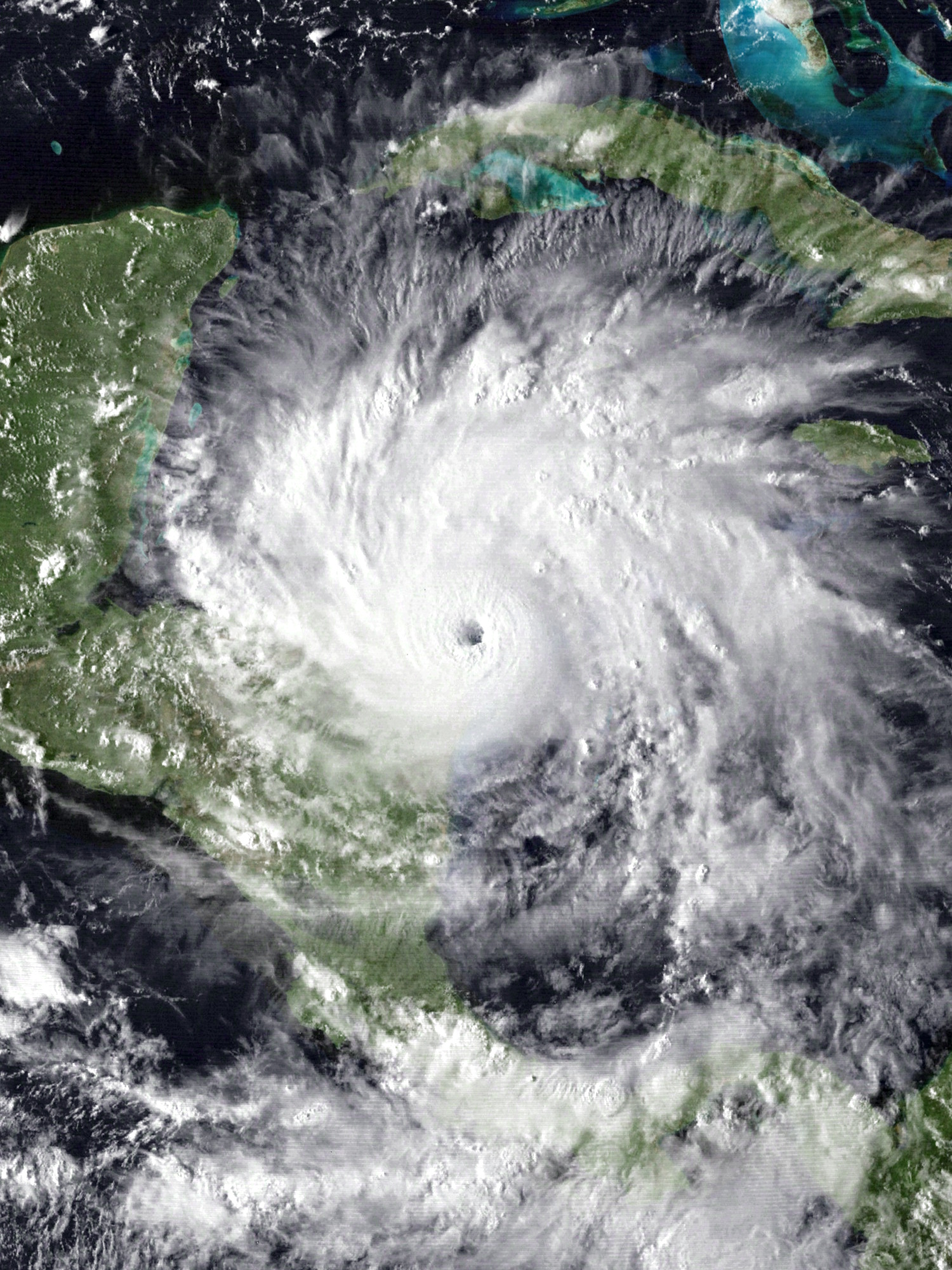
- Hurricane Greta in the Gulf of Honduras on September 17

Meteorological history
- Formed: September 13, 1978
- Dissipated: September 23, 1978

Category 4 major hurricane
- 1-minute sustained (SSHWS/NWS)
- Highest winds: 130 mph (215 km/h)
- Lowest pressure: 947 mbar (hPa); 27.96 inHg

Overall effects
- Fatalities: 5 direct
- Damage: $26 million (1978 USD)
- Areas affected: Windward Islands; Central America; Belize; Mexico
- IBTrACS
- Part of the 1978 Atlantic and Pacific hurricane seasons

Hurricane Greta, later renamed Hurricane Olivia, was one of fourteen named Atlantic hurricanes to cross over Central America into the eastern Pacific while remaining a tropical cyclone. The seventh named storm of the 1978 Atlantic hurricane season, Greta formed from a tropical wave just northwest of Trinidad on September 13, and despite being in a climatologically unfavorable area, gradually intensified while moving west-northwestward. On September 16, it became a hurricane south of Jamaica. Two days later, the well-defined eye approached northeastern Honduras but veered to the northwest. After reaching peak winds of 130 mph (210 km/h) that day, Greta weakened while paralleling the northern Honduras coast just offshore. On September 19, it made landfall on Belize near Dangriga and quickly weakened into a tropical depression while crossing Guatemala and southeastern Mexico. After entering the eastern Pacific, the system re-intensified into a hurricane and was renamed Olivia, the eighteenth named storm of the 1978 Pacific hurricane season which weakened before landfall and dissipated over Chiapas on September 23.

Taking a similar path to Hurricane Fifi four years prior, Greta threatened to reproduce the devastating effects of the catastrophic storm; however, damage and loss of life was significantly less than feared. In Honduras, about 1,200 homes were damaged, about half of which in towns along the coastline. The storm damaged about 75% of the houses on Roatán along the offshore Bay Islands, and there was one death in the country. In the Belize Barrier Reef, Greta downed trees and produced high waves, while on the mainland, there was minimal flooding despite a high storm surge. In Dangriga where it made landfall, the hurricane damaged or destroyed 125 houses and the primary hospital. In Belize City, a tornado flipped over a truck and damaged four houses. Damage in Belize was estimated at $25 million (1978 USD), and there were four deaths.

== Meteorological history ==
Map plotting the storm's track and intensity, according to the Saffir–Simpson scale Map key Saffir–Simpson scale Tropical depression (≤38 mph, ≤62 km/h) Tropical storm (39–73 mph, 63–118 km/h) Category 1 (74–95 mph, 119–153 km/h) Category 2 (96–110 mph, 154–177 km/h) Category 3 (111–129 mph, 178–208 km/h) Category 4 (130–156 mph, 209–251 km/h) Category 5 (≥157 mph, ≥252 km/h) Unknown Storm type Tropical cyclone Subtropical cyclone Extratropical cyclone, remnant low, tropical disturbance, or monsoon depression

A tropical wave exited the west coast of Africa near Dakar, Senegal on September 7. Moving westward across the Atlantic Ocean, the wave spawned an area of convection three days later, which gradually organized. On September 13, the wave moved through the Windward Islands, producing wind gusts of 50 mph (80 km/h) on Barbados. Later that day, it is estimated the system developed into a tropical depression about 75 mi (121 km) west-northwest of Trinidad, based on ship and land reports. Though located in a climatologically unfavorable area, the depression intensified and continued to develop. A hurricane hunter on September 14 indicated that the depression intensified into Tropical Storm Greta to the north of the Netherlands Antilles.

After becoming a tropical storm, Greta intensified slowly due to a strong trough to the northwest, and with the South American coastline located to the south, the southerly inflow was disrupted. With a ridge to the north along the 30th parallel, the storm moved quickly west-northwestward across the Caribbean. On September 16, Greta intensified into a hurricane about 275 mi (443 km) south of Jamaica. Shortly thereafter, the trough to the northwest weakened, which had been preventing the storm's intensification. An increasingly well-defined eye developed while approaching the coast of Honduras as the barometric pressure quickly dropped. Early on September 18, the eyewall passed just offshore Cabo Gracias a Dios, the sparsely populated border between Honduras and Nicaragua The NHC described the eye as having "literally ricocheted off of the protruding northeast coast of Honduras", thus sparing much of the country from the strongest winds. At 0710 UTC on September 18, the Hurricane hunters observed a minimum pressure of 947 mbar (28.0 inHg) just off the northern Honduras coast, which was the basis for the estimated peak intensity of 130 mph (210 km/h). This made it a Category 4 hurricane on the Saffir–Simpson scale.

Despite the proximity to land, Greta initially maintained a well-defined structure. The hurricane continued generally west-northwestward due to the ridge to the north, and initially was expected to enter the Bay of Campeche. After passing through the Bay Islands off northern Honduras, Greta weakened slightly while approaching Belize, and made landfall near Dangriga at 00:00 UTC on September 19, with winds of about 110 mph (180 km/h). The calm of the eye was reported for three to five minutes there. Rapidly weakening over land, the hurricane deteriorated to tropical depression status over Guatemala within 12 hours of landfall. A large high pressure area from the Carolinas to the central Gulf of Mexico turned Greta southwestward toward the eastern Pacific Ocean.

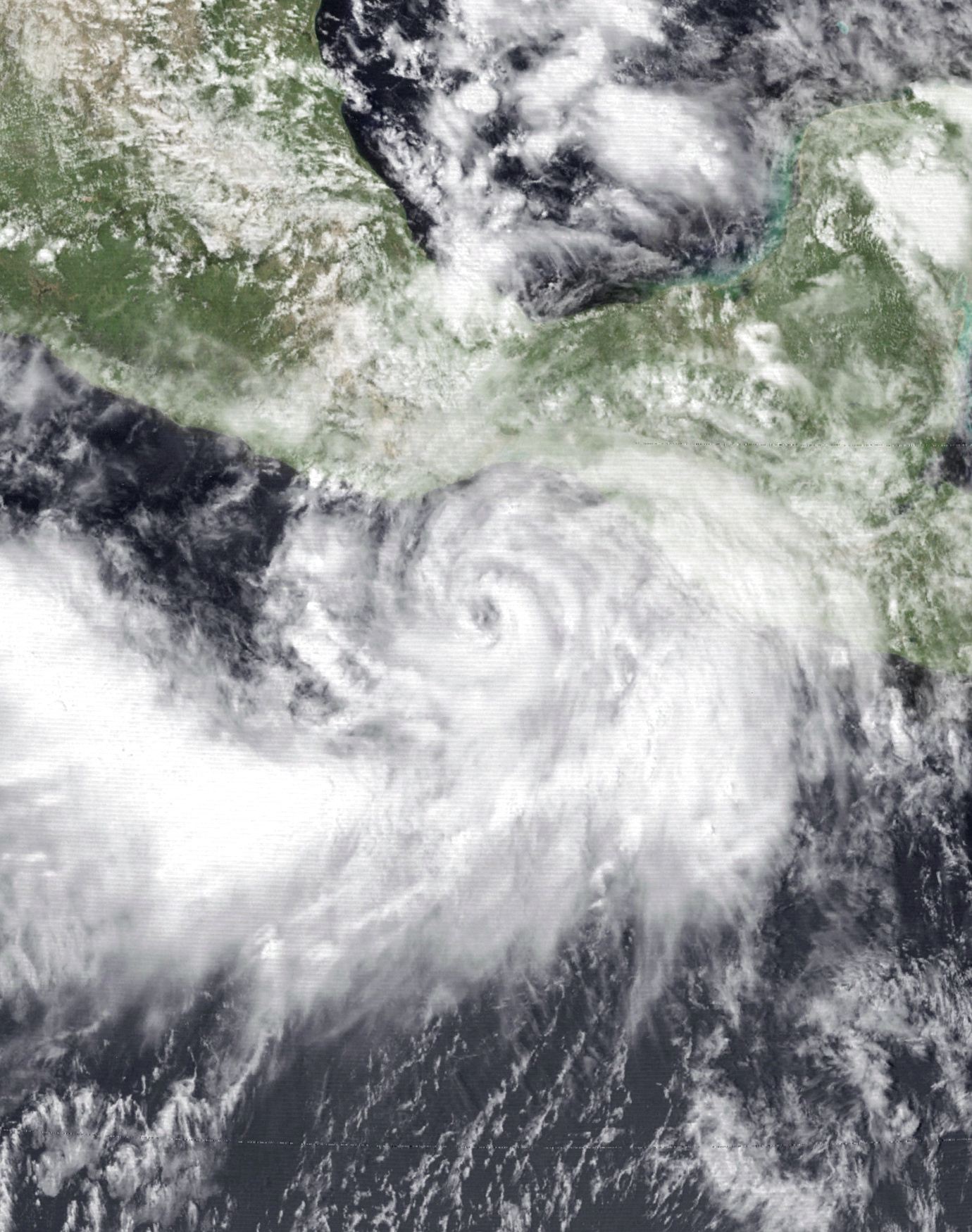
Hurricane Olivia in the eastern Pacific on September 21

At 00:00 UTC on September 20, the Eastern Pacific Hurricane Center (EPHC) took over responsibility for issuing advisories while Greta was 30 mi (48 km) from the coast. Soon after, the depression emerged over the warm waters of the eastern Pacific and re-intensified. At 06:00 UTC, the depression re-attained tropical storm status and named Olivia by the EPHC, becoming one of only fourteen named storms to maintain tropical cyclone status during the crossover. After initially moving to the north, Olivia began executing a slow counterclockwise loop. Based on observations from nearby ships and radar, it is estimated Olivia attained minimal hurricane status early on September 22. While tracking towards the Mexican coastline, the system weakened below hurricane threshold; between 19:00 and 20:00 UTC, Olivia made landfall about 60 mi (97 km) east of Salina Cruz. Early on September 23, Olivia dissipated over the Mexican state of Chiapas.

== Impact ==
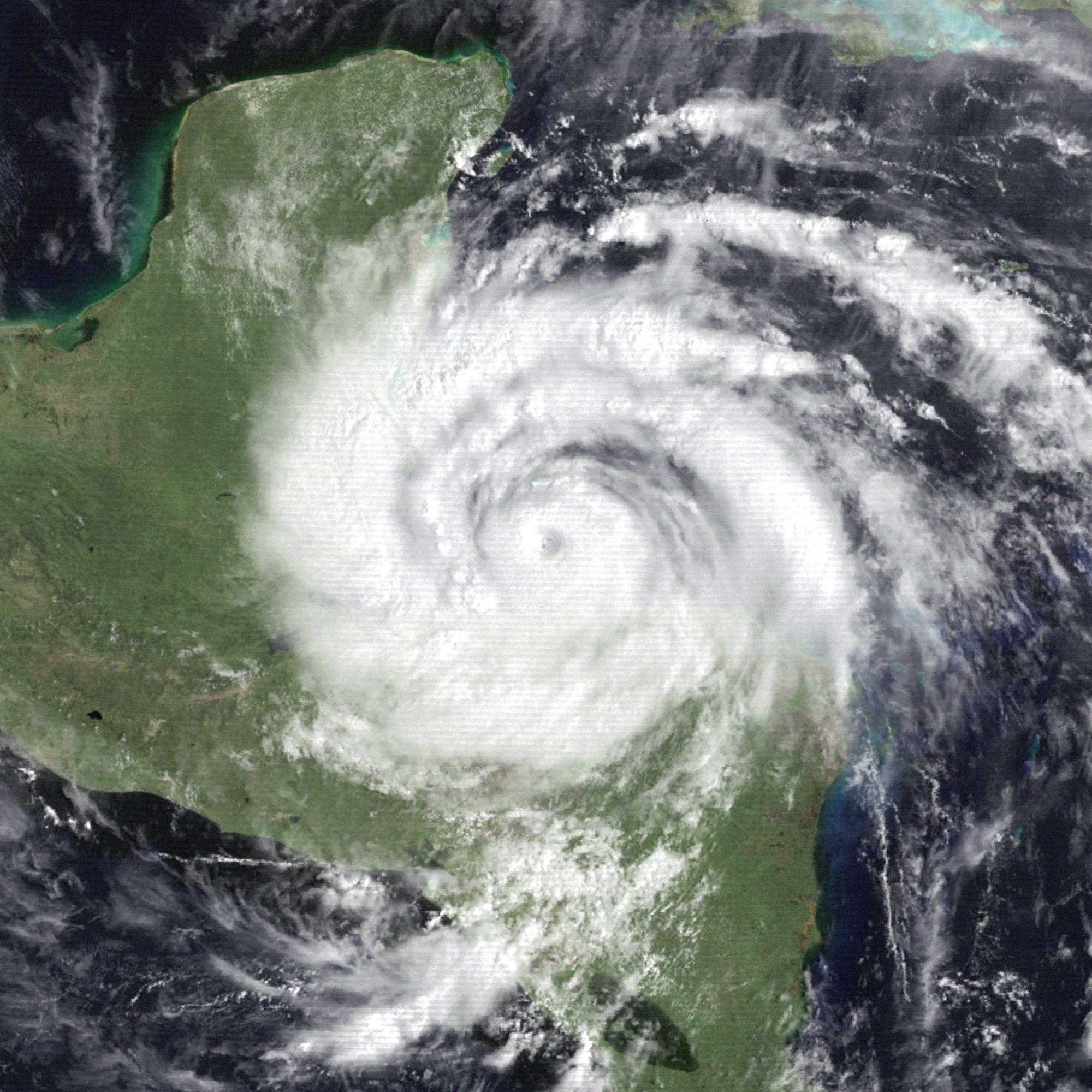
Image of Hurricane Greta north of Honduras on September 18

Early in its duration, Greta produced heavy rainfall in the Netherlands Antilles, but the strongest winds remained north of the island.

Late on September 17 when Greta's eye was just offshore Honduras, the country's government issued a hurricane warning for the eastern coastline. Around the same time, the Mexican government issued a hurricane warning for the eastern Yucatán Peninsula, and on September 18 a hurricane warning was issued for the Belize and Guatemala coastlines. These advanced warnings helped reduce fatalities. In Puerto Castilla, Honduras, about 2,000 people were evacuated in advance of the storm. The Honduran government put its military, police, and Red Cross on standby in advance of the storm, due to fears of a repeat of Hurricane Fifi in 1974. However, unlike Fifi, which caused deadly floods in the region four years prior and took a similar track, Greta did not cause as significant river flooding in Honduras.

Across much of Greta's track in Central America, the hurricane dropped locally heavy rainfall. When Greta passed just offshore northeastern Honduras, it produced sustained winds of 80 mph (130 km/h) in Puerto Lempira, with gusts to 115 mph (185 km/h). Winds along the northern Honduras coast were diminished due to the eyewall passing to the north. In Honduras, meteorologists estimated that upwards of 15 in (380 mm) of rain fell in mountainous regions. Many villages were isolated and communication with them was severely hampered. In Puerto Lempira, roughly 1,500 of the town's 7,000 residents sought refuge in five large structures during the storm. In twelve communities along the coastline, military officials reported that 656 homes were destroyed, of which 278 were in Punta Potuca. In the offshore Bay Islands, the hurricane destroyed 26 houses on Guanaja, where many roofs were lost and several boats were destroyed. On nearby Roatán, about 75% of the houses lost their roofs after experiencing wind gusts of 80 mph (130 km/h). There was one death in Honduras, and nationwide, the hurricane damaged about 1,200 homes, washed out roads and bridges, and wrecked coconut and rice crops.

At Greta's final landfall in Belize, the highest sustained winds were 55 mph (89 km/h) in Belize City, with gusts to 115 mph (185 km/h) at Dangriga near the landfall location. On the offshore Ambergris Caye, winds reached 60 mph (97 km/h), and there was heavy rainfall. On Half Moon Caye, the hurricane damaged the base of a lighthouse and knocked over several coconut trees. Along the Belize Barrier Reef, the hurricane downed palm trees and produced high waves, with significant wave heights of about 33 ft (10 m) along Carrie Bow Caye. On the mainland, storm tides in Dangriga were 6 to 7 ft (1.8 to 2.1 m) above normal, which did not cause much flooding. The strong winds destroyed 50 houses there and unroofed a further 75, including damage to the hospital. There were also disruptions to power and water service. About 90% of the grapefruit crop was destroyed, and 50% of the orange crop was lost. Tides were 2 to 4 ft (0.61 to 1.22 m) above normal in Belize City, which caused flooding in conjunction with swollen rivers. The United States embassy was flooded with about one foot of mud. There was little damage in the city, although a tornado in Belize City that damaged four houses and flipped over a truck. During the storm, the Belize International Airport was closed. Farther inland, strong winds caused heavy damage at Guanacaste National Park. Damage throughout Belize was estimated at $25 million (1978 USD), and there were four deaths. Three of the deaths were on offshore islands in areas without radios, and the other was due to electrocution.

== Aftermath ==
Following the storm damage in Honduras, the country requested help from the United States. The Tactical Air Command had sent two squadrons to Central America in the middle of 1978, and in response to the request from Honduras, two aircraft delivered over 100,000 lb (45,000 kg) of cots, water, and generators; the units also deployed a 13–person crew who specialized in disaster relief. The aid was distributed by the Military of Honduras.

In late October 1978, the United Methodist Church sent books and other supplies via aircraft to Belize, after a youth group rode out the storm there and desired to help residents. Despite the hurricane damage, the economy of Belize continued to grow after Greta struck, including an increase in banana production.

On account of the damage caused by the hurricane in the Atlantic basin, the name Greta was retired in the spring of 1979 by the regional hurricane committee of the World Meteorological Organization. It will never again be used to name a tropical system in the basin.

== See also ==
- Other storms named Greta
- Other storms named Olivia
- List of Atlantic–Pacific crossover hurricanes
- List of Category 4 Atlantic hurricanes
- List of Category 1 Pacific hurricanes
- Hurricane Edith (1971) – a Category 4 hurricane that rapidly intensified while approaching Cape Gracias a Dios
- Hurricane Irene–Olivia (1971) - A Category 3 hurricane with the same East Pacific basin name, crossed over from Atlantic to the Pacific
